= Rope (surname) =

Rope or Ropė is a surname, and may refer to:

- Anthony Rope (1756–1843), British convict and early settler of Australia
- Bronis Ropė (born 1955), Lithuanian politician
- Bryce Rope (1923–2013), New Zealand rugby union coach
- Donald Rope (1929–2009), Canadian ice-hockey player
- Ellen Mary Rope (1855–1934), English sculptor
- George Thomas Rope (1846–1929), British painter
- Henry Edward George Rope (1880–1978), English writer, poet, editor and priest
- John Rope (1855 or 1863–1944), White Mountain Apache clan leader and Apache scout
- Margaret Agnes Rope (1882–1953), English stained glass artist (cousin of M E Aldrich Rope)
- M. E. Aldrich Rope (1891–1988), English stained glass artist (cousin of Margaret Agnes Rope)
- Patti Rope (born 1959), Canadian gymnast

== See also ==
- Roper (surname)
