= Cord =

Cord or CORD may refer to:

== Common meanings ==
- String
- Thin rope
- Twine
- Cord (unit) used for measuring wood
- Power cord
- Umbilical cord

Cord or CORD may also refer to:

== Places ==
- Cord, Arkansas

== People ==
- Alex Cord (1933–2021), American actor and writer
- Chris Cord (1940–2022), American racing driver
- Errett Lobban Cord (1894–1974) American industrialist
- Ronnie Cord (1943–1986), Brazilian singer
- Cord Jefferson, American writer and film director
- Cord McCoy (born 1980), American bull and saddle bronc rider
- Cord Meyer (1920–2001), American CIA official
- Cord Parks (born 1986), American professional football player
- Cord Phelps (born 1987), American professional baseball player
- Cord Pool, guitarist for American red dirt metal band Texas Hippie Coalition
- Cord Widderich (died 1447), German pirate

== Arts, entertainment, and media ==
- Cord (band), a British rock group
- Cord (film), a 2000 film starring Daryl Hannah and Jennifer Tilly
- Cord, a fictional character in The Silent Flute
- Cordero "Cord" Buchanon, a fictional character in One Life to Live
- The Cord Weekly, a student newspaper at Wilfrid Laurier University

== Biology ==
- Chronic obstructive respiratory disease or CORD, an alternate name for chronic obstructive pulmonary disease
- Mycelial cord, a structure, used by fungi to transfer nutrients over larger distances
- Spinal cord
- Umbilical cord, a tube that connects a developing embryo or fetus to its placenta

== Organizations ==
Organizations with the acronym CORD include:

- Canadian Organization for Rare Disorders, a non-profit health organization
- Christian Outreach for Relief & Development, a humanitarian organization, based in Leamington Spa, England
- Civil Operations and Revolutionary Development Support, (CORDS) a pacification program of the U.S. in the Vietnam War
- Coalition for Reforms and Democracy, a Kenyan political coalition
- Council of Emergency Medicine Residency Directors, a scientific organization

== Computing ==
- An electrical cable
- Rope (data structure) or cord, a data structure for strings

== Other uses ==
- Cord (climbing) a type of rope used in climbing
- Cord (sewing), a decorative trim made of multiple strands of yarn twisted together
- Cord, a short form for the textile type corduroy
- Cord Automobile, a former American car marque

== See also ==
- Chord (disambiguation)
- Cordage (disambiguation)
- CORDS (disambiguation)
- Rope (disambiguation)
- String (disambiguation)
