= Rope (disambiguation) =

Rope is a length of fibers that are twisted or braided together

Rope may also refer to:

- Wire rope, a length of metallic fibers twisted or braided together

== Computing ==
- Core rope memory, a ferrite read-only memory
- IpTables Rope, an open-source firewall programming language
- Rope (data structure), a data structure used in computer science

== Film, television and theatre ==
- Rope (play), a 1929 play by Patrick Hamilton
  - Rope (film), a 1948 film by Alfred Hitchcock based on the play
  - Rope (1957 film), an Australian TV adaptation originally aired by ABC
  - Rope (1959 television play), an Australian TV adaptation originally aired by GTV
- The Rope (miniseries), a 2021 French thriller miniseries
- Roped, a 1919 silent film directed by John Ford and starring Harry Carey
- Rudens (lit. The Rope), a 3rd-century BC play by Plautus

== Music ==
- The Rope, a 1986 album by Black Tape for a Blue Girl
- "Rope" (song), by Foo Fighters, 2011

== Persons with surname Rope ==
- Rope (surname)

== Other uses ==
- Colloquial for execution by hanging
- Research Opportunity and Performance Evidence (ROPE), concept used by the Australian Research Council
- Rope, or Corde lisse, an aerial acrobatics attribute/discipline
- Rope (rhythmic gymnastics), a rhythmic gymnastics apparatus
- Rope (torture), an instrument of torture used by the Huguenots
- Rope (unit), any of several units of measurement
- Boundary rope in cricket
- Rope, Cheshire, a civil parish in Cheshire
- Rope Kojonen (1874–1931), Finnish politician
- Rope climbing, a sport
- Fast-roping (or Fast Rope Insertion Extraction System), a military assault technique

== See also ==
- Ropes (disambiguation)
