= Cordage =

Cordage may refer to:

- Rigging, cords and ropes attached to masts and sails on a ship or boat
- Rope, yarns, plies or strands twisted or braided together into a larger form

== See also ==
- String (disambiguation)
- Cord (disambiguation)
- Rope (disambiguation)
