= Ropes (disambiguation) =

Ropes are groups of yarns, plies, fibers or strands that are twisted or braided together into larger and stronger forms.

Ropes or The Ropes may also refer to:

- Ropes (surname)
- Rope (rhythmic gymnastics), a rhythmic gymnastics apparatus
- Rope (torture), an instrument of torture used by the Huguenots
- Rope (unit), any of several units of measurement
- Rope (data structure), a data structure used for fast string operations
- The Ropes, an indie rock band from New York
- Rope (film), 1948 film directed by Alfred Hitchcock
- Ropes & Gray, a major multinational law firm headquartered in Boston, Massachusetts

== See also ==
- Nathaniel Ropes Building, a commercial building in Cincinnati, Ohio
- On the Ropes (disambiguation)
- Ropes course
- Ropes Creek, a creek in New South Wales
- Ropes Crossing, New South Wales
- Ropes End, a summer house in Phippsburg, Maine
- Ropes Mansion, a mansion in Salem, Massachusetts
