= Margaret Rope =

Margaret Rope is the name of:

- Margaret Agnes Rope (1882–1953), stained glass artist from Shrewsbury, Shropshire, U.K.
- M. E. Aldrich Rope (1891–1988), christened Margaret Edith Rope, stained glass artist from Leiston, Suffolk, U.K.
