= CORDS =

The acronym CORDS may refer to:

- Center for Orbital and Reentry Debris Studies
- Connecting Organizations for Regional Disease Surveillance
- Civil Operations and Revolutionary Development Support, a pacification program of the U.S. in the Vietnam War
- Cords Cable Industries Limited, an India-based multinational corporation

== See also ==
- Cord
- Corduroy, a ridged velvet fabric
