= Henry Edward George Rope =

English Catholic priest (1880–1978)

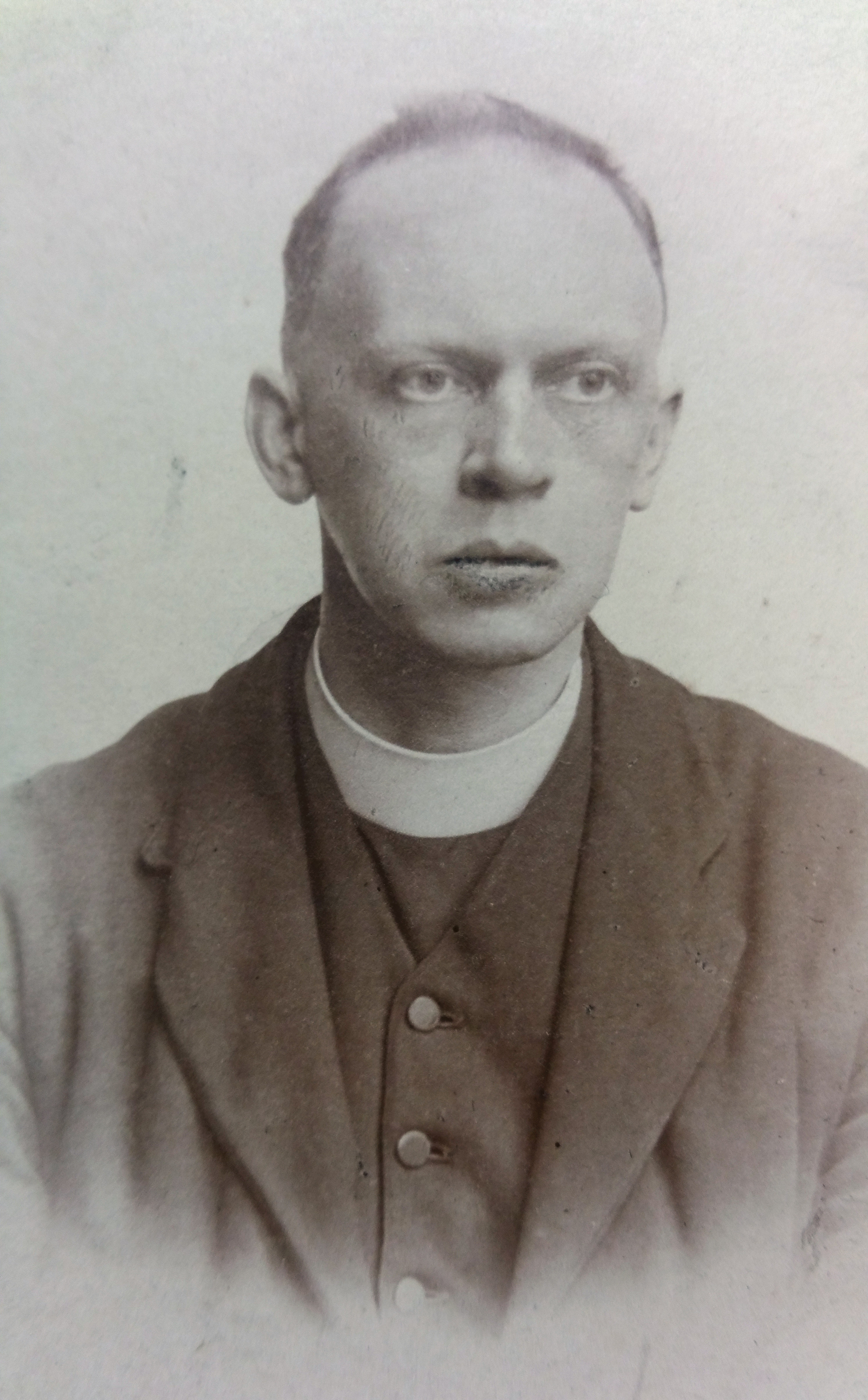
- Rope, c. 1915
- Born: 23 October 1880 Shrewsbury, England
- Died: 1 March 1978 (aged 97) Lambeth, London
- Resting place: St Michael and the Holy Family, Kesgrave, Suffolk
- Education: Attended Christ Church, Oxford, University of Oxford, Pontifical Beda College
- Genre: Books, articles, poems
- Subject: Roman Catholicism, Traditionalism (19th-century Catholicism), distributism

Henry Edward George Rope (23 October 1880 – 1 March 1978) was a writer, poet, and Catholic priest. He was the eldest brother of Margaret Agnes Rope, stained-glass artist, nephew of Ellen Mary Rope, sculptor, and George Thomas Rope, painter and naturalist as well as cousin of M. E. Aldrich Rope, another stained-glass artist. Due to his writings and his work as archivist at the Venerable English College, Rome, he was well known in his lifetime, particularly within Church circles but as a radical traditionalist he has been forgotten in modern times.

== Life ==
Baptised 20 November 1880, eldest child of Henry John Rope, M.D., surgeon (1847 – 1899) and Agnes Maud (née Burd: 1857 – 1948) and grandson of George Rope of Grove Farm, Blaxhall, Suffolk (1814 – 1912) and his wife Anne (née Pope) (1821 – 1882), he was brought up an Anglo-Catholic but joined the Roman Catholic church after the premature death of his father and in the wake of the conversion of his mother and four of his five siblings. After Shrewsbury School, he went up to Christ Church, Oxford, University of Oxford in 1898 to read English as a Careswell Exhibitioner. He was on the staff of the Oxford English Dictionary from 1903 to 1905 and again 1908–10. Between those dates (1905–07), he was a lector in English at Breslau University, then part of Germany. He entered the Catholic Church on 6 January 1907 and in 1912 enrolled at the Pontifical Beda College in Rome to train for the priesthood. Immediately prior to that, he had been a novice at the German Benedictine Beuronese Congregation then in exile at Erdington Abbey, Birmingham. He was ordained at St John Lateran, Rome on 27 February 1915. He served in the Shrewsbury Diocese up until 1937, in which year, on 30 October, he took up the position of Archivist to the Venerable English College, Rome. His positions as a priest included Chester St Werburgh 1915–17, Crewe 1917–18, Plowden, Shropshire 1918–24, Market Drayton 1924–25, chaplain Mawley Hall (near Cleobury Mortimer) 1925–37. His tenure in Rome was interrupted by the Second World War, during which he served as chaplain at Albrighton Hall, Shrewsbury 1940–44 to the Convent of the Sacred Heart, evacuated from Tunbridge Wells. He rejoined the English College in exile and, on return to Rome after the war in 1946, again served as Archivist, until 30 December 1957. Back in England, he settled at the Carmelite Monastery, Quidenham, Norfolk, where his sister Margaret Agnes Rope, stained-glass artist had died some four years previously. By then a man in his late seventies and eighties, he served as chaplain at Pallotti Hall, Siddington, Cheshire 1959–69, before returning to Quidenham. Finally, in 1975, he transferred to the Catholic Nursing Institute, 80 Lambeth Road, London S.E.1. where he died three years later.

== Works ==
Rope was a scholar, a linguist and a prolific writer, of poems, articles and books. A man of strong traditionalist opinions, an advocate of Distributism, an enemy of mechanisation and, above all, the motor car, his writings are a prolonged elegy for the ways of the past, and an elevation of time-honoured forms of Catholic faith and worship. He edited The Catholic Review quarterly in succession to its founder Benedict Williamson, a fellow convert from Anglicanism. He took the opportunity to include poems of his own, which also appeared in several collections, detailed below. He also wrote a number of books and well as articles in a number of Catholic publications, including The Month, Ampleforth Journal, The Cross and the Plough, G. K.'s Weekly, The Weekly Review, The Dublin Review, The Irish Monthly and The Catholic World and Venerabile.

A typical article available online is "Martyrs and Markets" Articles in The Month included Unfounded Optimism, The Fallacy of Reunion, Tolerance In Praise of Papal Rome, The Balm of Solitude, Is Anglo-Catholicism near The Church?, La Terre Qui Meurt, Compromise no Charity, The Limitations of Richard Cobden, Elizabethan Continuity: Bishop Tunstall's Confession of the Faith, The Theory of Progress, Jewel: an Early Exponent of Anglicanism. Similarly, in The Irish Monthly "The Real John Donne" "An English historian of Ireland" "Bella Tola, in the Valais (July, 1914)". Likewise in New Blackfriars "Lourdes and Art", "The Staleness of Novelty". Also, in the Irish Quarterly Review, "Epiphanytide" (poem),

In 1940 his biography of Pope Benedict XV was published, having been started in 1938. In prefacing it, Rope stated that he hoped the biography would serve as "small effort in reparation" for the fact that few British Catholics (himself included) had listened to Benedict's message of peace during the Great War. He also noted that, as of 1938, many were now wishing they had listened to the 'Pope of Peace'. As of 2021, Rope's biography is one of a limited number of English-language biographies of Benedict XV - the other notable biography being John F. Pollard's The Unknown Pope: Benedict XV (1914-1922) and the Pursuit of Peace (1999).

A range of his more secular interests is on view in "Forgotten England". On a more piecemeal level, having been on the staff of the Oxford English Dictionary in his early adulthood (as a member of Murray's, and, from 1905, Bradley's editorial staff), he continued to be a contributor of material throughout his life. On a campaigning front, he is quoted as being a "leader of the Catholic Land Movement" in 1931.

Apart from his writings, his life was enriched by many friendships, which he nurtured with a wealth of correspondence. Apart from Benedict Williamson, on whom he wrote a two-part monograph, he is associated with G.K.Chesterton, Hilaire Belloc, John Hawes and many others.

== Publications ==
- Religionis Ancilla, and other poems, [Heath Cranton, London, 1916]
- Soul's Belfry and Other Verses [Stretton Press, 1919]
- The City of the Grail [Burns, Oates & Washbourne, London, 1923]
- The Hills of Home, and other verses [A.H. Stockwell, London, 1925]
- Matthew Parker's witness against continuity [Burns Oates & Washbourne, London, 1931]
- Forgotten England and Other Musings [Heath Cranton, London 1931]
- Round about the Crooked Steeple, A Shropshire Harvest by Simon Evans [Heath Cranton, London, 1931], foreword by H.E.G.Rope
- Flee to the fields :the faith and works of the Catholic land movement. A symposium [Heath Cranton, London, 1934] Chapter X "Looking Before and After" by H.E.G.Rope
- Fisher and More [A.Ouseley, London, 1935]
- Pugin [Pepler & Sewell, Ditchling Hassocks, 1935]
- Benedict XV, The Pope of Peace [The Catholic Book Club, London, 1940]
- The Schola Saxonum, the Hospice, and the English College in Rome: a brief account[Scuola Tipografica Miss. Domenicana S. Sisto Vecchio, Rome, 1951]
- Dream holiday, and other verses [Arthur H. Stockwell, Ilfracombe, 1964]
- Evolution and the Lunatic Fringe [E.Biddle, Ludlow, Salop, 1964]
