= John Glennon (writer and actor) =

American actor and dramatist (born 1931)

John Glennon (born 1931) is an American stage actor, writer, screenwriter, and playwright.

== Career ==
As an actor, his notable Broadway credits include roles in productions of Saint Joan, Six Characters in Search of an Author, Richard III, Cyrano de Bergerac, The Taming of the Shrew, and King Richard II, and he was stage manager on How to Be a Jewish Mother.

Glennon sold his first script to CBC in 1957, when he was performing in Saint Joan on Broadway.

He is known for his television writing credits on Armchair Mystery Theatre, Armchair Theatre, Ruth and Rope (both 1959), ITV Play of the Week (1957–1961), Playdate, BBC Sunday-Night Play, and Encounter.

=== Australia ===
Glennin travelled to Melbourne on 8 August 1959 to present two plays for GTV-9, starting with Ruth, which was a part of Shell Presents and directed by Rod Kinnear. He was also to help coach Australian writers and producers on US drama techniques. The producers wanted Lyndall Barbour to play the lead. She was tracked down to a hotel room in Paris and John Glennon travelled from London to persuade her to accept the part. He also co-starred in the production. The play was produced in Melbourne at the GTV 9 studios. While rehearsing it Glennon said he was working on a play about Australians in London. The TV critic from the Sydney Morning Herald called it "a highly original and diverting play" where Glennon's writing was "in an attractively inventive and individual way that sometimes shades into the eccentric". Another version aired as a BBC Sunday-Night Play in 1962, starring Constance Cummings, again written by John Glennon, and this time directed by Henry Kaplan."

Rope was the other 1959 Australian TV play he wrote and starred in, also part of Shell Presents and again directed by Kinnear, based on the play by Patrick Hamilton. Glennon played one of the lead roles. Glennon made several changes to the play, including cutting the time down from two hours to an hour, shifting the action from 1929 to present day New York, and moving the local from one-room to a four-room penthouse. "Whereas the original dealt with distance," said Glennon, "you can now eliminate long speeches and convey the same idea by gesture or by a bit of business magnified a hundred fold by that eagle eyed camera." The Sydney Morning Herald critic praised "John Glennon's clever, perceptive and highly mannered performance... and the tensions which producer Rod Kinnear was able to generate by some thoughtful camera work, and some very skilful organisation on a large and attractive set." The Age TV credit praised the set, credit sequence and some of the acting but had reservations about some of the performances and the direction.

According to Filmink "Glennon is one of a number of people who came down under in the late '50s and early '60s to help "instruct" Australians how to make television drama... This was very much in the long tradition of Australian cultural institutions being impressed by a foreign accent, particularly one from England or America."

== Select Credits ==
- King Richard II (1951)(Broadway stage play) – actor
- Taming of the Shrew (1951)(Broadway stage play) – actor
- Cyrano de Bergerac (1953)(Broadway stage play) – actor
- Richard III' (1953)(Broadway stage play) – actor
- Six Characters in Search of an Author (1955–56)(Broadway stage play) – actor
- Saint Joan (1956–57) (Broadway stage play) – actor
- The Movie Star (1957) (Canadian TV play) – writer
- On Camera (1957) (Canadian TV series) – actor
- The New Adventures of Martin Kane (1957) (British TV series) – actor
- Boy Meets Girl (1957) (British TV play) – adaptation
- The Wooden Dish (1957) (British TV play) – adaptation
- Dark of the Moon (1958) (Canadian TV play) – actor
- The Bird, the Bear and the Actress (1959) (British TV play) – writer
- Ruth (1959) (Australian TV play) – writer, actor
- Rope (1959) (TV play) – adaptation, actor
- The Shrike (1960) (British TV play) – adaptation
- The Big Wheel (1960) (British TV play) – writer
- The Dirtiest Word in the English Language (1960) (US TV play) – writer (same script as Ruth)
- Ladies of the Corridor (1960) (British TV play) – adaptation
- Midnight Sun (1961) (British TV play) – adaptation
- Ivanov (1961) (British TV play) – adaptation
- The Big Wheel (1962) (Canadian TV play) – writer
- Ruth (1962) (British TV play) – writer
- Come Back Little Sheba (1963) (stage play) – director
- The Tenth Man (1963) (stage play) – director
- The Crucible (1965) (stage play) – director
- The Bird, the Bear and the Actress (1966) (stage play) – writer
- Hogan's Goat (Broadway stage play) – stage manager
- How to be a Jewish Mother (1967)(Broadway stage play) – stage manager
- I Only Want an Answer (Broadway stage play) – stage manager
- Blithe Spirit (1968) (community theatre stage play) – director
- The Threepenny Opera (1968) (community theatre stage play) – director
