= Ropes (surname) =

Ropes is a surname, likely of a trade-related origin. People with the surname include:

- Adrian Ropes (1941–2004), Egyptian-born English television actor
- Arthur Reed Ropes, real name of Adrian Ross (1859–1933), British songwriter
- Bradford Ropes (1905–1966), American novelist and screenwriter
- David Ropes (died 1781), privateer from Salem, Massachusetts
- George Ropes (1788–1819), American artist
- James Hardy Ropes (1866–1933), American theologian
- John Codman Ropes (1836–1899), American military historian and lawyer, co-founder of the law firm Ropes & Gray
- Nathaniel Ropes (c. 1726–1774), justice of the Massachusetts Supreme Judicial Court
  - Ropes Mansion, named for the justice
- Nathaniel Ropes, merchant and namesake of the Nathaniel Ropes Building in Cincinnati, Ohio
- Sharon Erickson Ropes (born 1954), Minnesota politician
- Wayne M. Ropes (1898–1948), American politician and businessman
