= Chord =

Chord or chords may refer to:

== Art and music ==
- Chord (music), an aggregate of musical pitches sounded simultaneously
  - Guitar chord, a chord played on a guitar, which has a particular tuning
- The Chords (British band), 1970s British mod revival band
- The Chords (American band), 1950s American doo-wop group
- The Chord (painting), a c.1715 painting by Antoine Watteau
- Andrew Chord, a comic book character who is the former mentor of the New Warriors

== Mathematics ==
- Chord (geometry), a line segment joining two points on a curve
- Chord (graph theory), an edge joining two nonadjacent nodes in a cycle

== People ==
- Chord Overstreet, American actor and musician
- Chords (musician), a Swedish hiphop/reggae artist

== Programming ==
- Chord (concurrency), a concurrency construct in some object-oriented programming languages
- Chord (peer-to-peer), a peer-to-peer protocol and algorithm for distributed hash tables (DHT)

== Science and technology ==
- Chord (astronomy), a line crossing a foreground astronomical object during an occultation which gives an indication of the object's size and/or shape
- Canadian Hydrogen Observatory and Radio-transient Detector (CHORD), a proposed successor to the CHIME radio telescope
- Chord (aeronautics), the distance between the front and back of a wing, measured in the direction of the normal airflow. The term chord was selected due to the curved nature of the wing's surface
- Chord in truss construction – an outside member of a truss, as opposed to the inner "webbed members"
- In British railway terminology, a chord can refer to a short curve of track connecting two otherwise unconnected railway lines.
- Mouse chording, the capability to perform an action when holding multiple buttons on a computer mouse.
- Chord keyboard, a computer device allowing for input based on pressing multiple keys simultaneously

== See also ==
- Animal taxonomy chordate (chordata) and eponymous notochord
- Cord (disambiguation)
