= Heart Strings =

Heartstrings or Heart Strings may refer to:

- The chordae tendineae

== Film and television ==
- Heart Strings (1917 film), an American drama film directed by Allen Holubar
- Heart Strings (1920 film), an American drama film directed by J. Gordon Edwards
- Heartstrings (1923 film), a British silent romance film
- Heartstrings (2009 film), a British animated film
- Heartstrings (2016 film), a French romantic comedy
- Heartstrings (South Korean TV series), a 2011 South Korean television series
- Heartstrings (American TV series), an American anthology television series
- Heartstrings (Hong Kong TV series), a 1994 Hong Kong television series, starring Aaron Kwok and Gigi Lai
- "Heart Strings" (Doctors), a 2004 television episode

== Music ==
- The Heartstrings, earlier name of The Heartbeats

=== Albums ===
- Heart String (Earl Klugh album), 1978
- Heartstrings (Howling Bells album), 2014
- Heartstrings (Leighton Meester album), 2014
- Heartstrings (Willie P. Bennett album), 1999
- Heart Strings (Linda Lewis album), 1974
- Heart Strings (Bonnie Tyler album), 2003
- Heart Strings (Moya Brennan album), 2008

=== Songs ===
- "Heartstrings" (Janet Leon song), 2013
- "Heart Strings" by Oh Wonder from Ultralife, 2017
- "Heartstrings" by Leighton Meester from Heartstrings, 2014
- "Heartstrings" by Berlin from Count Three & Pray, 1986
- "Heartstrings" by M-22 featuring Ella Henderson, 2022

== See also ==
- String (disambiguation)
