= Ruth (Shell Presents) =

- Shell Presents episode
- The Age ad 3 Sep 1959
- Episode no.: Season 1 Episode 7
- Directed by: Rod Kinnear
- Teleplay by: John Glennon
- Original air date: 5 September 1959

Episode chronology
← Previous "Thunder of Silence"	Next → "A Tongue of Silver"

"Ruth" is a 1959 Australian television play. It was presented as part of the Shell Presents program and starred Lyndall Barbour. It was written by John Glennon, an American actor and writer who appeared in the production, and directed by Rod Kinnear. The play aired in Melbourne on 5 September 1959 and in Sydney on 19 September 1959.

It was "a saga of older/woman/younger lover."

== Plot ==
Cal, is a lonely man, whose mother did not show him much affection. He is a neighbour to Ruth, a woman with mental problems. Cal's mother and neighbours have attitudes about it.

== Cast ==
- Lyndall Barbour as Ruth
- John Glennon as Cal
- Edward Howell
- Jeannie James
- Barbara Brandon
- Agnes Dobson
- Lorna Stirling
- Murielle Hearne
- Betty Randall
- Wyn McAlpin
- Wyn Pullman

== Production ==
John Glennon arrived in Melbourne on 8 August 1959 to present two plays for GTV-9, starting with "Ruth"'. He was also to help coach Australian writers and producers on US drama techniques. According to Filmink "Glennon is one of a number of people who came down under in the late ‘50s and early ‘60s to help “instruct” Australians how to make television drama... This was very much in the long tradition of Australian cultural institutions being impressed by a foreign accent, particularly one from England or America "

The producers wanted Lydall Barbour to play the lead. She was tracked down to a hotel room in Paris and John Glennon travelled from London to persuade her to accept the part. The play was produced in Melbourne at the GTV 9 studios.

While rehearsing it Glennon said he was working on a play about Australians in London.

== Reception ==
The TV critic from the Sydney Morning Herald called it "a highly original and diverting play" where Glennon's writing was "in an attractively inventive and individual way that sometimes shades into the eccentric". He said "the play's great fault is that its ingredients are too rich for comfortable compression into an hour. It needs more time and space to develop ideas ana incidents too arbitrarily imposed in this production."

The Age TV critic wrote that those viewers "who got the message" would have found the play "interesting. For those who didn't it could have been a bit of a bore."

Filmink said it was "no classic but it's interesting and it gave Lyndall Barbour a terrific part." The review elaborated:

Glennon’s script contains a lot of tropes used in 1950s American drama – the eccentric older female, who lives life on her own terms and inspires a lonely boy protagonist to break free of an overprotective mother and follow his dreams... It’s not bad. It’s very familiar and scripts about sensitive boys who secretly dream of playing the guitar automatically deserve some sort of fine, but it has integrity, the two leads combine well together, and after a while I got into the play’s rhythms.

== 1962 adaptation ==
Another version aired as a BBC Sunday-Night Play in 1962, starring Constance Cummings, again written by John Glennon, and this time directed by Henry Kaplan.

=== 1962 cast ===
Constance Cummings	...	Ruth Anipas
Maxwell Shaw	...	Nick Anipas
Doris Nolan	...	Mrs. Richey
Fiona Duncan	...	Katherine Anipas
Nicholas Bennett	...	Cal Richey
Louise Howard	...	Miss Swanson
Helen Horton	...	Nurse
Anne Padwick	...	Mrs. Kanakaris
Daphne Newton	...	Mrs. Stimpokas
