= Strine (disambiguation) =

Strine is a humorous word for a type of Australian accent.

Strine may also refer to:

- Strines, a village in Greater Manchester
- Strine Brook, a tributary of River Douglas in Lancashire, England
- River Strine, Shropshire, England
- Charles Strine (1867–1907), American theatrical and opera manager
- Leo E. Strine, Jr. (born 1964), American judge
- Michael Strine, former vice president of the Federal Reserve Bank of New York

== See also ==
- Strinesdale Reservoir, in Greater Manchester, England
