= Rope (Shell Presents) =

- Shell Presents episode
- Advertisement from The Age, 29 Oct 1959
- Episode no.: Season 1 Episode 9
- Directed by: Rod Kinnear
- Teleplay by: John Glennon
- Original air date: 31 October 1959
- Running time: 70 mins

Episode chronology
← Previous "A Tongue of Silver"	Next → "Pardon Miss Westcott"

"Rope" is a 1959 Australian TV play based on the play by Patrick Hamilton. It was part of Shell Presents. It aired on 31 October 1959 in Melbourne, and a tapped version aired on 15 November 1959 in Sydney.

The play Rope had been filmed for Australian television by the ABC in 1957. It was one of several Patrick Hamilton adaptations done on Australian television. (Murder mysteries were popular on Australian television at the time.) It was also arguably one of the first depictions of queer characters on Australian television.

== Plot ==
Two friends, Charles and Wyndham, murder someone for fun.

== Cast ==
- John Glennon as Wyndham Brandon
- Paul Karo as Charles Granillo
- Walter Sullivan as Rupert
- Feli Wittman as Simone
- Tom Farley
- Graeme Jones
- Muriel Hearne

== Production ==
The play was adapted by American actor-playwright John Glennon who also played one of the lead roles. According to Filmink "Glennon is one of a number of people who came down under in the late ‘50s and early ‘60s to help “instruct” Australians how to make television drama... This was very much in the long tradition of Australian cultural institutions being impressed by a foreign accent, particularly one from England or America."

Sydney model Feil Wittman made her acting debut as Simone.

Glennon made several changes to the play including cutting the time down from two hours to an hour, shifting the action from 1929 to present day New York, and moving the local from one room to a four-room penthouse. "Whereas the original dealt with distance," said Glennon, "you can now eliminate long speeches and convey the same idea by gesture or by a bit of business magnified a hundred fold by that eagle eyed camera."

== Reception ==
The Sydney Morning Herald critic praised "John Glennon' s clever, perceptive and highly mannered performance... and the tensions which producer Rod Kinnear was able to generate by some thoughtful camera work, and some very skilful organisation on a large and attractive set."

The Age TV credit praised the set, credit sequence and some of the acting but had reservations about some of the performances and the direction.
