= On the Ropes =

On the Ropes may refer to:

- On the Ropes (1999 film), an American documentary film
- On the Ropes (2011 film), a British mockumentary film
- On the Ropes (album), a 1999 album by Mint Royale
- On the Ropes (TV series), a 2018 Australian drama series
- "On the Ropes" (Doctors), a 2004 television episode
