= Connecting Organizations for Regional Disease Surveillance =

Regional infectious disease surveillance network

The Connecting Organizations for Regional Disease Surveillance (CORDS) is a "regional infectious disease surveillance network that neighboring countries worldwide are organizing to control cross-border outbreaks at their source." In 2012, CORDS was registered as a legal, non-profit international organization in Lyon, France. As of 2021, CORDS was composed of "six regional member networks, working in 28 countries in Africa, Asia, the Middle East and Europe."

== Synopsis ==
CORDS are "distinct from more formal networks in geographic regions designated by the World Health Organization (WHO)... Some of these regional networks existed before the sudden 2003 outbreak of SARS," for example:

- the Pacific Public Health Surveillance Network (PPHSN) (1996),
- the Mekong Basin Disease Surveillance (MBDS) network (1999), and
- the East African Integrated Disease Surveillance Network (EAIDSNet) (2000)
- the Southeastern European Health Network (SEEHN) (2001)
- the Asia Partnership on Emerging Infectious Diseases Research (APEIR) (2006)
- the SACIDS Foundation for One Health (SACIDS) of the Southern African Development Community (2008)
- the Southeast European Center for Surveillance and Control of Infectious Diseases (SECID) (2013)

== History ==
The CORDS grew out of the 1960s-era Organisations de Coordination et de Cooperation pour la lutte contre les Grandes Endemies (OCCGE) which was an African network, reformed in 1987 to add the West African Health Community (WAHC) and give birth to the West African Health Organisation (WAHO).

The PPHSN was formed in 1996 in order to "streamline" members' "disease reporting and response". In 1997, the PPHSN set up PacNet, in order to "share timely information on disease outbreaks" and "to ensure appropriate action was taken in response to public health threats."

In 2000, the Global Outbreak Alert and Response Network was formalized by the WHO.

In 2001, was formed the Southeastern European Health Network (SEEHN) which grouped the governments of Albania, Bosnia and Herzegovina, Bulgaria, Croatia, Moldova, Montenegro, Romania, and the Former Yugoslav Republic of Macedonia.

In 2003, Israel, Jordan and the Palestinian Authority established the Middle East Consortium on Infectious Disease Surveillance (MECIDS).

The growth of the CORDS can be categorised into several overlapping phases:

- from 1996 to 2007, the effort was to train and connect people to contain local epidemics
- from 2003 to 2009, the effort was aimed to enhance "cross-border and national surveillance systems to address regional threats", including a particular focus of EAIDSNet on zoonotic diseases
- from 2006 to at least 2017 the focus was to strengthen "preparedness for pandemics and other public health threats of regional and global scale.

In 2005, the International Health Regulations (IHR) mandated official reporting of certain types of disease outbreaks to WHO.

In 2007, the Rockefeller Foundation (RF) used funds from the Nuclear Threat Initiative (NTI) to convene in Bellagio "regional surveillance networks from across the globe to initiate a dialogue about how to harness lessons learned, emerging technologies, and nascent support." In 2009 the RF used funds from NTI to "create a community of practice" named CORDS, which in 2012 was concretized in Lyon France as a legal, non-profit international organization. CORDS convened the 1st Global Conference on Regional Disease Surveillance Networks at the Prince Mahidol Award Conference in 2013.
