= Council of Emergency Medicine Residency Directors =

CORD logo

The Council of Emergency Medicine Residency Directors (CORD) is a scientific and educational organization headquartered in Irving, Texas.

It was formed to represent residency program directors and their assistants after emergency medicine became a primary board specialty by the American Board of Medical Specialties (ABMS). The organization was originally "Council of Residency Directors in Emergency Medicine", and its name was changed to its present form in 2018.

CORD "provides resources, develops best practices for emergency medicine training programs, and offers professional development for leaders in emergency medicine education through the CORD Community."
