= Rope (1957 film) =

1957 television film directed by William Sterling

- Ad from SMH 21 Aug 1957
- Genre: thriller
- Based on: Rope (play); 1927 play by Patrick Hamilton
- Directed by: William Sterling
- Starring: Bruce Beeby; Roger Climpson; June Collis
- Country of origin: Australia
- Original language: English

Production
- Producer: William Sterling
- Running time: 70 minutes
- Production company: ABC

Original release
- Network: ABC
- Release: 21 August 1957 (Sydney, live)
- Release: 20 September 1957 (Melbourne, tape)

Rope is a 1957 Australian television film based on the play Rope by Patrick Hamilton. It was presented in real time.

Broadcast live in Sydney, it was kinescoped/telerecorded for showing in Melbourne (these were the only Australian cities with TV at the time). Based on the play by Patrick Hamilton, it aired in a 70-minute time-slot on non-commercial ABC.

It was one of several Patrick Hamilton adaptations done on Australian television. It was also arguably one of the first depictions of queer characters on Australian television. Murder mysteries were popular subjects for Australian television plays.

== Plot ==
Two friends, Granello and Brandon, commit murder for the thrill of it. They hide the body in their apartment and invite the family and friends of their victim over for a party.

== Cast ==
- John Meillon
- Bruce Beeby
- Don Pascoe
- Roger Climpson
- June Collis
- Tom Farley
- Keith Jervis

== Production ==
Rehearsals started in July 1957. Star John Meillon just finished a long run on stage in The Reluctant Debutante. It was recorded in Sydney and broadcast live. A tape recording was later broadcast in Melbourne. It was Meillon's first TV play.

== Reception ==
According to an article on 19 September 1957 edition of The Age, the broadcast was well received by viewers during its Sydney telecast, and producer Sterling was happy with the quality of the kinescope/telerecording.

== 1959 Australian TV version ==
The play was filmed again for Australian TV in 1959, this time shot in Melbourne for ATN Channel 7.

== See also ==
- List of live television plays broadcast on Australian Broadcasting Corporation (1950s)
