= Cords Cable Industries Limited =

Indian instrumentation cable maker

- Company logo
- Type: Public
- Traded as: BSE: 532941, NSE: CORDSCABLE
- ISIN: INE792I01017
- Industry: Electrical cable manufacturer
- Headquarters: New Delhi, India

Cords Cable Industries Limited (BSE: 532941, NSE: CORDSCABLE, ISIN: INE792I01017) is the largest instrumentation cable maker in India.

With its headquarters in New Delhi, it manufactures instrumentation cables, control cables, thermocouple cables, power cables and special cables for signaling and electrical connectivity requirements, mainly for industrial use. The company manufactures cables up to 3.3 kilovolt for applications including industrial, utility and buildings. It caters to industries such as electric power, steel, cement, fertilizers and chemicals, and refinery/petroleum. The Company’s products include medium-tension control cables (up to 3.3 kilovolt), medium-tension power cables (up to 3.3 kilovolt), instrumentation cables, signal and data cables, thermocouple extension/compensating cables, panel wires/house hold wires/flexible cables, and specialty cables.

Naveen Sawhney is the Managing Director, and Chairman of the Board of the company.

== Listing ==
In January 2008, the Company came out with an IPO and on 13 February 2008 got listed on Bombay Stock Exchange and National Stock Exchange of India.

== Rankings ==
In 2008, Cords Cable Industries Limited became the only Cable manufacturer in the Asia-Pacific Region to be listed by Forbes magazine in its 'Asia's 200 Best Companies Under a Billion List'.

In 2012, Cords Cable Industries Limited was ranked 513th by International Business Times in its list, published on 16 January 2012, of world's 1000 fasted-growing companies.
