= Ellen Mary Rope =

British sculptor (1855–1934)

- Pencil portrait of the sculptor in her old age, by Rosamond Praeger
- Born: 14 March 1855; Blaxhall, England
- Died: 13 September 1934 (aged 79); Blaxhall, England
- Education: Slade School of Fine Art
- Known for: Sculpture
- Notable work: Bas-reliefs in metal and plaster; also decorative ceramics

Ellen Mary Rope (1855–1934) was a British sculptor whose career stretched from 1885 until the early 1930s. Her work is notable for its range of expression and style, from the classical to the popular. She worked chiefly in bas-reliefs, in stone, cast metal or plaster.

== Life ==
Born the seventh child of George and Anne Rope of Blaxhall, Suffolk, Ellen Mary Rope is said to have displayed strong artistic leanings as a child, maybe under the influence of her eldest brother, George Thomas Rope, a landscape painter and naturalist. To foster this interest, she was sent to London in 1870 to study at Nottingham Place School in Marylebone, where she was taught drawing by Octavia Hill.

She later returned to her home village and attended the Ipswich School of Art, taught by, among others, William T. Griffiths, the principal. Her first exhibited works were paintings and drawings of similar rural subjects to her brother, who exhibited alongside her. She returned to London to the Slade School of Fine Art in 1877, continuing to study drawing and painting but, in 1880, Professor Alphonse Legros introduced a course in sculpture and modelling, which Rope followed to good effect, radically influencing the direction of her artistic career.

Her art developed along classic Arts and Crafts lines, with emphasis on the artist's involvement throughout the creative process and manual not mechanised production. Rope was based in London for most of her professional career, latterly in Deodar Road, Putney, where she shared accommodation and a studio with her assistant Dorothy Anne Aldrich Rope, a niece. In the same road was the stained-glass studio of another niece M. E. Aldrich Rope, not to be confused with a third artistic niece, Margaret Agnes Rope.

Ellen Mary Rope only fully retired to the family home at Grove Farm in Blaxhall shortly before her death in 1934 at age 79.

== Works ==
Her first piece at the Royal Academy of Arts was a terracotta panel: "David playing before Saul" (1885). From that date she had works at R.A. Exhibitions in most years up until 1918. By 1893 she was sufficiently well known to be commissioned to provide four plaster relief figures for spandrels in the Woman's Building (Chicago) of the World Columbian Exposition in Chicago. Each polychrome panel was nearly six feet tall, and represented Faith, Hope, Charity and Heavenly Wisdom.

As well as exhibition pieces, she had a more commercial strand to her art, becoming a leading designer for the Della Robbia Pottery from 1896 until its closure in 1906. This led to more popular domestic works featuring children, flowers and the sea. These small panels "were primarily designed to be executed at low cost and repeated if desired, so that they could be used by others than the very rich" However, major architectural commissions continued, including large figures of Faith, Hope and Charity for Morley Town Hall, Leeds (since lost), a 20' long panel for Rotherhithe Town Hall (destroyed by wartime bombing), and a memorial executed in cement at St Mary's, Bolton-on-Swale.

Her association with the Garrett circle, dating back to childhood, led to her spandrels from Chicago being installed in the dining room of Chenies Street Ladies' Residential Chambers (a project of cousins Rhoda and Agnes Garrett) and later to the marble memorial to the mother of Elizabeth Garrett Anderson in Aldeburgh parish church. Earlier, in 1894, another Garrett associate, Octavia Hill, had commissioned bas-reliefs by Rope for the drawing room of the Women's University Settlement in Nelson Square, Blackfriars.

Rope's 1902 memorial plaque in marble to Mary Anne Moberley is located in Salisbury Cathedral.

== Gallery ==
"David playing before Saul", 1885, terracotta panel

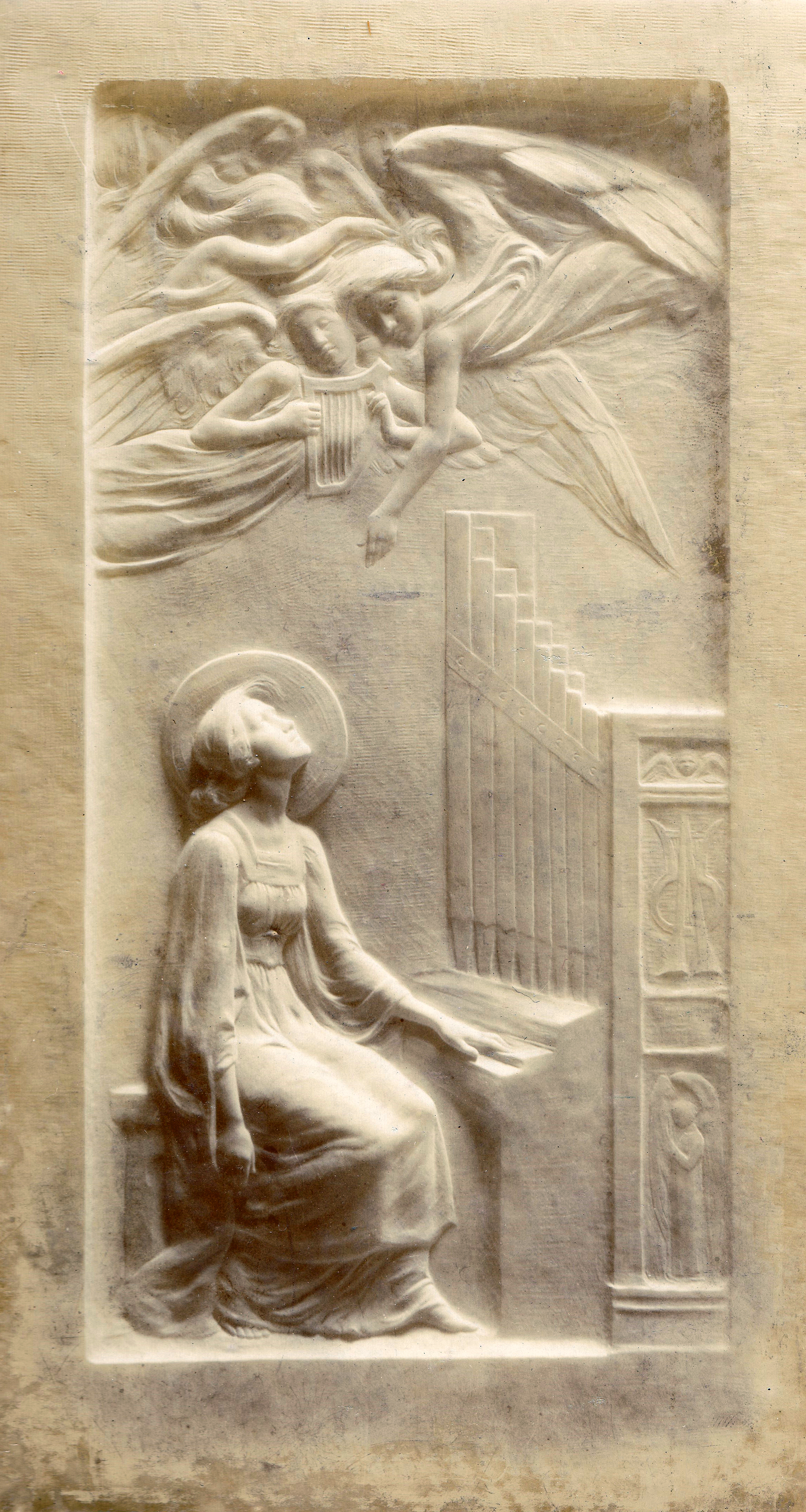
Marble bas-relief probably of the Virgin Mary

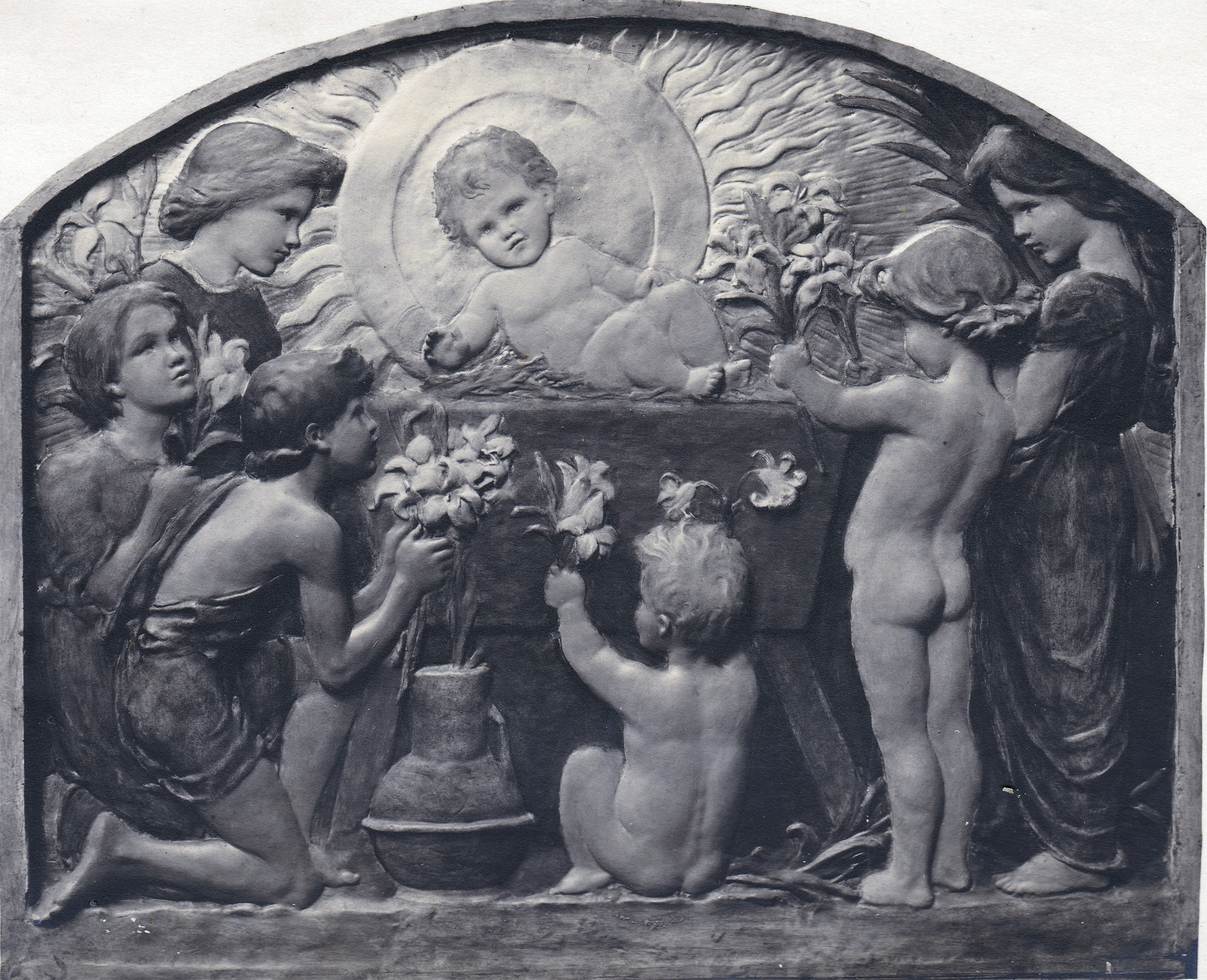
Christchild with contemporary children, and lilies: a typical later theme, reused in several locations

Plaster panel in her local parish church, St Peter's, Blaxhall, Suffolk

"Patience and Hope steering the Boat of Education", plaster panel
