= String (disambiguation) =

String is a long, flexible tool made from fibers.

String or strings may also refer to:

== Arts, entertainment, and media ==
=== Films ===
- Strings (1991 film), a Canadian animated short
- Strings (2004 film), a film directed by Anders Rønnow Klarlund
- Strings (2011 film), an American dramatic thriller film
- Strings (2012 film), a British film by Rob Savage
- Bravetown (2015 film), an American drama film originally titled Strings
- The String (2009), a French film

=== Music ===
==== Instruments ====
- String (music), the flexible element that produces vibrations and sound in string instruments
- String instrument, a musical instrument that produces sound through vibrating strings
  - List of string instruments
- String piano, a pianistic extended technique in which sound is produced by direct manipulation of the strings, rather than striking the piano's keys

==== Types of groups ====
- String band, musical ensemble composed mostly or entirely of string instruments, common in bluegrass, jazz, and country music
- String orchestra, orchestra composed solely or primarily of instruments from the string family
- String quartet, musical ensemble of four string players, common in chamber music ensembles
- String section ("the strings"), section of a larger symphony orchestra composed of string musicians

==== Genres ====
- String (Thai pop), a genre of Thai pop music

==== Performers ====
- Strings (band), a pop rock band from Pakistan
- Strings (rapper), Marinna Teal (born 1975), American rapper

==== Recordings ====
- Strings (EP), an EP by Kristin Hersh
- Strings (Strings album), the debut album by Strings
- Strings!, a 1967 album by jazz guitarist Pat Martino
- "Strings", by Blink-182 from Buddha, 1994
- "Strings", by Shawn Mendes from Handwritten, 2015
- "Strings", by Taemin from Advice, 2021
- "Strings, Strings", by Gerald Levert from G, 2000

=== Other uses in arts, entertainment, and media ===
- "String", a Monty Python sketch about a marketing campaign for string, appearing initially on their Contractual Obligation Album
- String, a character controlled by Marik in the Yu-Gi-Oh! Japanese manga
- Silly String, a child's toy, also known as aerosol string

== Fashion ==
- String bikini
- Thong, C-string, G-string, V-string

== Foods and cooking ==
- String of a bean, in cooking, is the hard fibrous spine that runs the length of the pod in all but stringless varieties
- String bean, a name for several different varieties of bean
- String cheese, a common name for several different types of cheese
- String hopper, a rice noodle dish

== Mathematics ==
- String graph, an intersection graph of curves in the plane; each curve is called a "string"
- String group, in group theory

== Science and technology ==
=== Bioinformatics ===
- STRING (Search Tool for the Retrieval of Interacting Genes/Proteins, previously Search Tool for Recurring Instances of Neighbouring Genes), a database and web resource of known and predicted protein-protein interactions.

=== Computer sciences ===
- String (computer science), sequence of alphanumeric text or other symbols in computer programming
  - String (C++), a class in the C++ Standard Library
  - Strings (Unix), a Unix program for finding character strings in binary files
  - C string handling, a header in the C standard library
  - String literal, the notation for representing a string value within the text of a computer program
  - Connection string, a string that specifies information about a data source and the means of connecting to it

=== Drilling ===
- Casing string
- Drill string
- Production string

=== Medicine ===
- Brock string, an instrument used in vision therapy
- String galvanometer, an instrument that provided the first practical electrocardiogram (ECG)
- String sign, a medical term used in diagnosing hypertrophy pyloric stenosis

=== Physics ===
- Cosmic string, a hypothetical 1-dimensional (spatially) topological defect in various fields
- Dirac string, a fictitious one-dimensional curve in space, stretching between two magnetic monopoles
- String theory, a popular grand unified theory
  - String (physics), one of the main objects of study in string theory
  - Black string is a higher-dimensional (more than 4-dimensional) generalization of a black hole
  - Strings (conference), series of conferences on string theory
- String vibration, equations for an ordinary vibrating string

=== Other uses in science and technology ===
- Yaw string, also known as a slip string, a simple device for indicating a slip or skid in an aircraft in flight
- String bog, a bog consisting of slightly elevated ridges and islands, with woody plants, alternating with flat, wet sedge mat areas
- String potentiometer, a transducer used to detect and measure linear position and velocity using a flexible cable and spring-loaded spool

== Sports ==
- String, a series of consecutive wins in baseball jargon
- Strings (tennis), the part of a tennis racket which makes contact with the ball

== Other uses ==
- Pushing on a string, metaphor
- String of cash coins (currency unit), in the Far East
- String Lake, a lake in Grand Teton National Park, Wyoming, United States.
- String Publishing, an imprint of the German group VDM Publishing devoted to the reproduction of Wikipedia content
- String puzzle, any mechanical puzzle whose emphasis is on manipulating one or more pieces of string or rope
- String ribbon, ribbon made of string
- String trimmer, a device for cutting grass and other small plants
- Strings, the nickname of the Swedish musician Robert Dahlqvist
- Marik String, former acting Legal Adviser of the U.S. Department of State

== See also ==
- Chain (disambiguation)
- Heart Strings (disambiguation)
- Red string (disambiguation)
- Strine (disambiguation)
- String of pearls (disambiguation)
