= Charles Strine =

American journalist

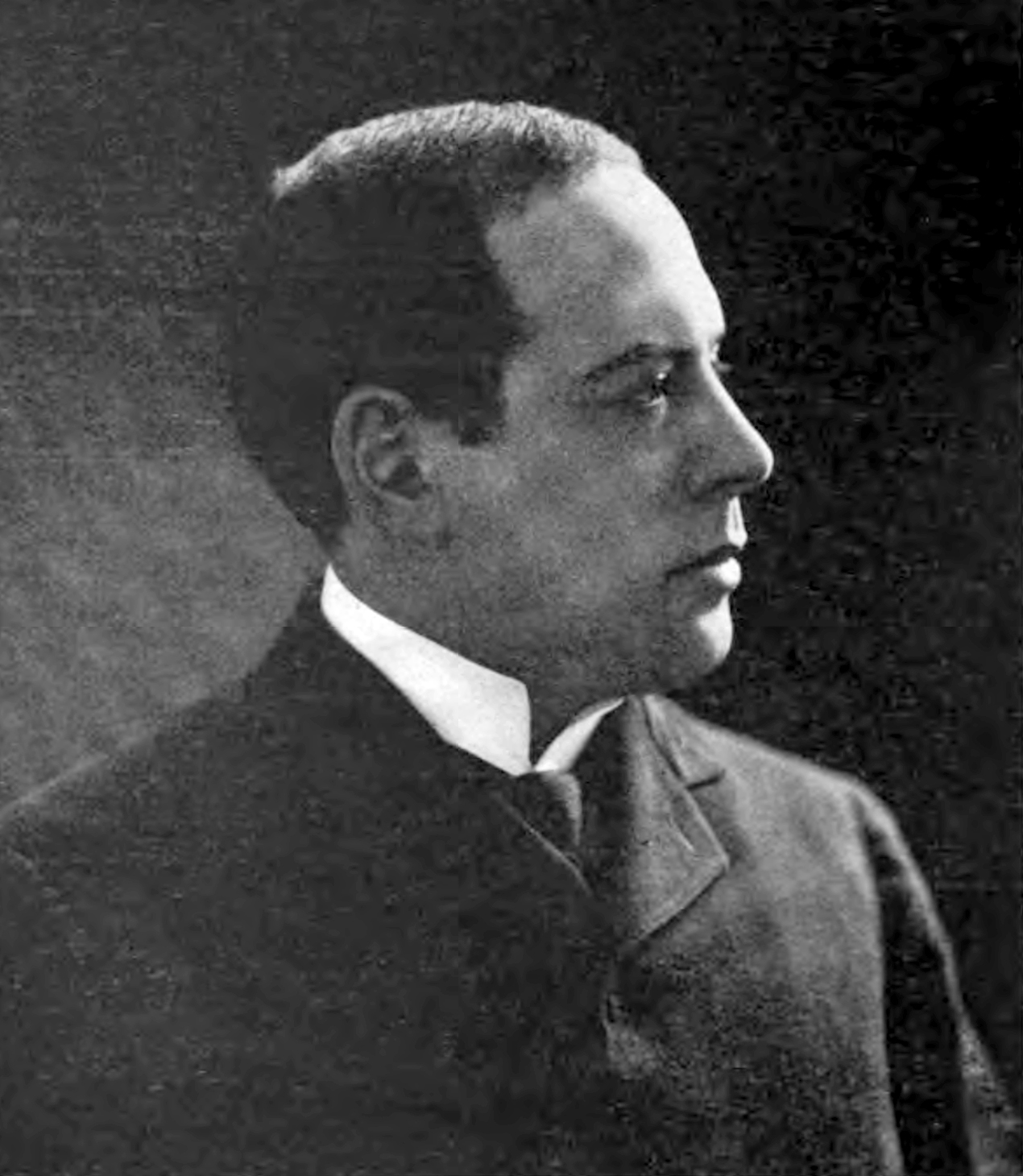
- Born: January 4, 1867; Philadelphia, Pennsylvania, US
- Died: April 6, 1907 (aged 40); Boston, Massachusetts, US
- Occupations: Opera and theatrical manager

Charles William Strine (January 4, 1867 – April 6, 1907) was an American theatrical and opera manager best known for arranging the national tours and residencies of the Metropolitan Opera Company under the direction of Maurice Grau and Heinrich Conried.

== Career ==
Charles William Strine was born January 4, 1867, in Philadelphia, Pennsylvania. After working as a reporter, for newspapers including The Philadelphia Record, he became a theatrical manager. He co-managed the Grand Opera House in Philadelphia for a season of opera.

He managed the Ellis Opera Company in its 1898 and 1899 cross-country tours. In 1904 he was engaged as associate manager of the Tivoli Opera House in San Francisco, and the following year he assumed responsibility for the highly successful (and lucrative) San Francisco residency of the Metropolitan Opera company, under the direction of Heinrich Conried.

Strine managed US tours by Paderewski, the Metropolitan Opera company under Maurice Grau, and the first American tour of Nellie Melba. Strine represented Sarah Bernhardt for her 1905–06 tour of the US, Canada and Mexico.

He left Bernhardt in 1906 to undertake management of the cross-county tour of the Conried Metropolitan Opera Company. The tour ended disastrously after the San Francisco earthquake of April 18, 1906. It occurred hours after a performance of Carmen at the Grand Opera House, in which Enrico Caruso performed the role of Don Jose. Strine lost all of his profits, as well as the new 2,000-seat theater that he had just been chosen to manage. In the earthquake and fire, the Metropolitan Opera company lost all of the costumes, scenery, props and music for 19 operas, valued at more than $250,000, the equivalent of $8,958,333 today.

In the autumn of 1906 Strine managed a tour by Henry B. Irving and Dorothea Baird. He was in Boston, preparing a spring tour by the Conreid Metropolitan Opera Company, when he had an attack of appendicitis. Strine died April 6, 1907, at Boothby Hospital in Boston, a week after unsuccessful surgery. He was survived by a wife and daughter.
