= George Thomas Rope =

British painter

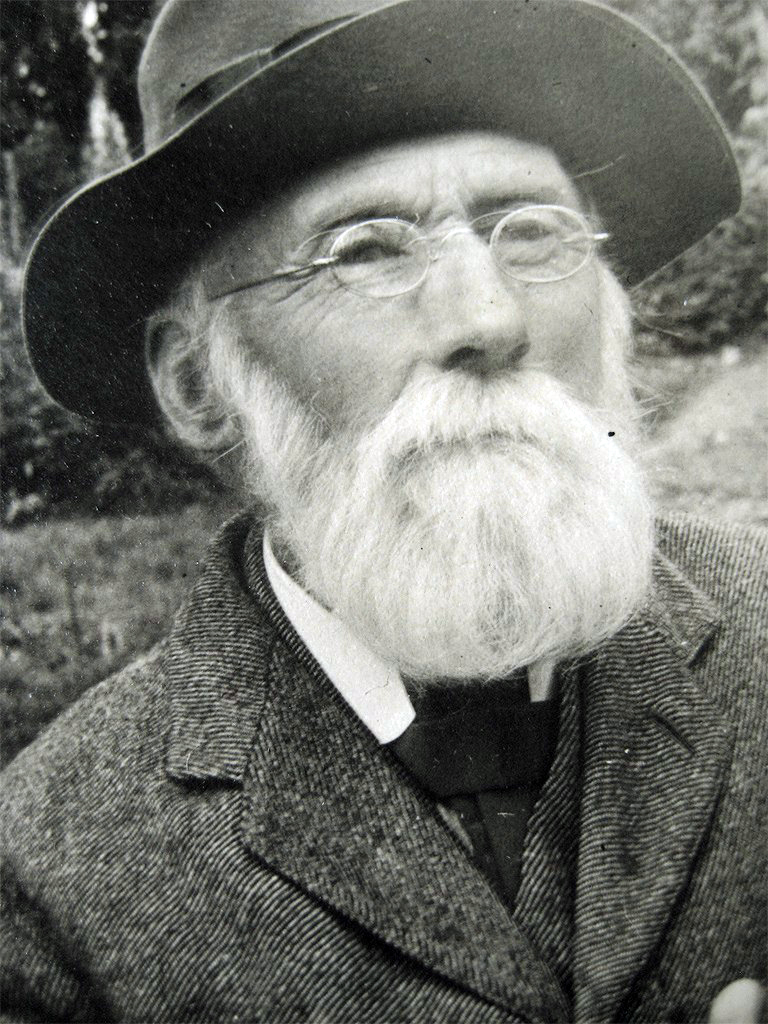
- Born: 11 February 1846; Blaxhall, England
- Died: 12 December 1929 (aged 83); Blaxhall, England
- Education: William Webb, 1875-1877
- Known for: Painting, drawing, natural history
- Notable work: Oil paintings, pencil sketches, watercolours

George Thomas Rope (1846–1929) was a British painter whose productive period stretched from 1875 until 1915 and beyond. His work focused on country landscapes and animals, particularly horses, and is notable for its detailed faithfulness to location and accuracy of representation. He worked chiefly in oils but also sketched in pencil and charcoal as well as painting in water colours. He was a quintessentially East Suffolk artist although he did occasionally tackle subjects from further afield. He was also a sensitive observer of natural history and was the author of many articles and one book on the subject.

== Life ==
Born on 11 February 1846, the second child and first son of George and Anne Rope of Blaxhall and Orford, Suffolk, George Thomas Rope was considered to be of weak health. As a result, in his adult life he was able to leave the more robust careers of doctor, farmer and architect to his younger brothers while he pursued the development of his skills as a graphic artist and naturalist. Before his brother Arthur's marriage, he had assisted with the accounts and other paperwork at the former's farm but then turned to devote himself entirely to his artistic career, taking tuition from a London artist, William Webb. His first work to be displayed at the Royal Academy (in 1877) was an oil painting entitled Field Mice, which sold for 25 guineas, a substantial price for an unknown emerging artist. From 1875 onwards, he exhibited at the Ipswich Fine Art Club virtually every year until 1915 inclusive After that date, he ceased exhibiting but published a collection of his nature writings collected under the title of "Country Sights and Sounds" in 1915. He continued submitting articles on Natural History and another of his areas of interest, the Suffolk dialect, until his last years. Despite the diagnosis of weak health, he lived to the age of 83 and only died in 1929 as the result of an accident while out driving a pony and trap.

George Thomas Rope was the eldest of a number of family artists, including a younger sister Ellen Mary Rope, a sculptor well known in her time, and three nieces Margaret Agnes Rope and M. E. Aldrich Rope, both notable stained glass artists, and Dorothy Anne Aldrich Rope, another sculptor.

== Works ==
The surviving oeuvre of George Thomas Rope encompasses oil paintings, usually of country scenes and animals, particularly horses, watercolours on similar subjects, sketches in pencil (or pencil-and-wash) and sketches in ink, sometimes humorous. His fortes were animals, both domestic and wild, country scenes, trees and, distinctively, low-light and night-time subjects. The works shown in the gallery encompass a range of his work, which continues to attract collectors' interest.

== Gallery ==
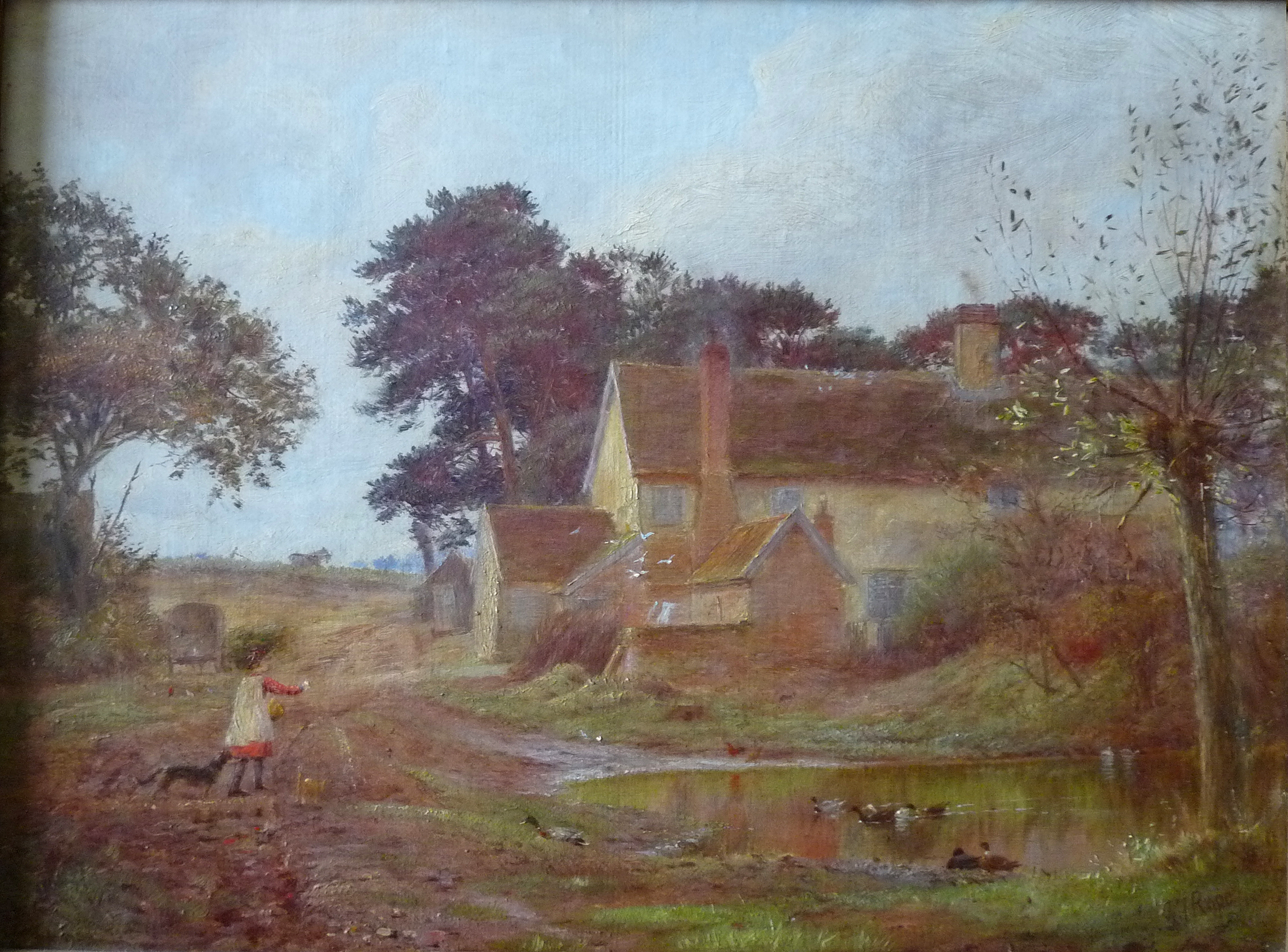
Oil painting

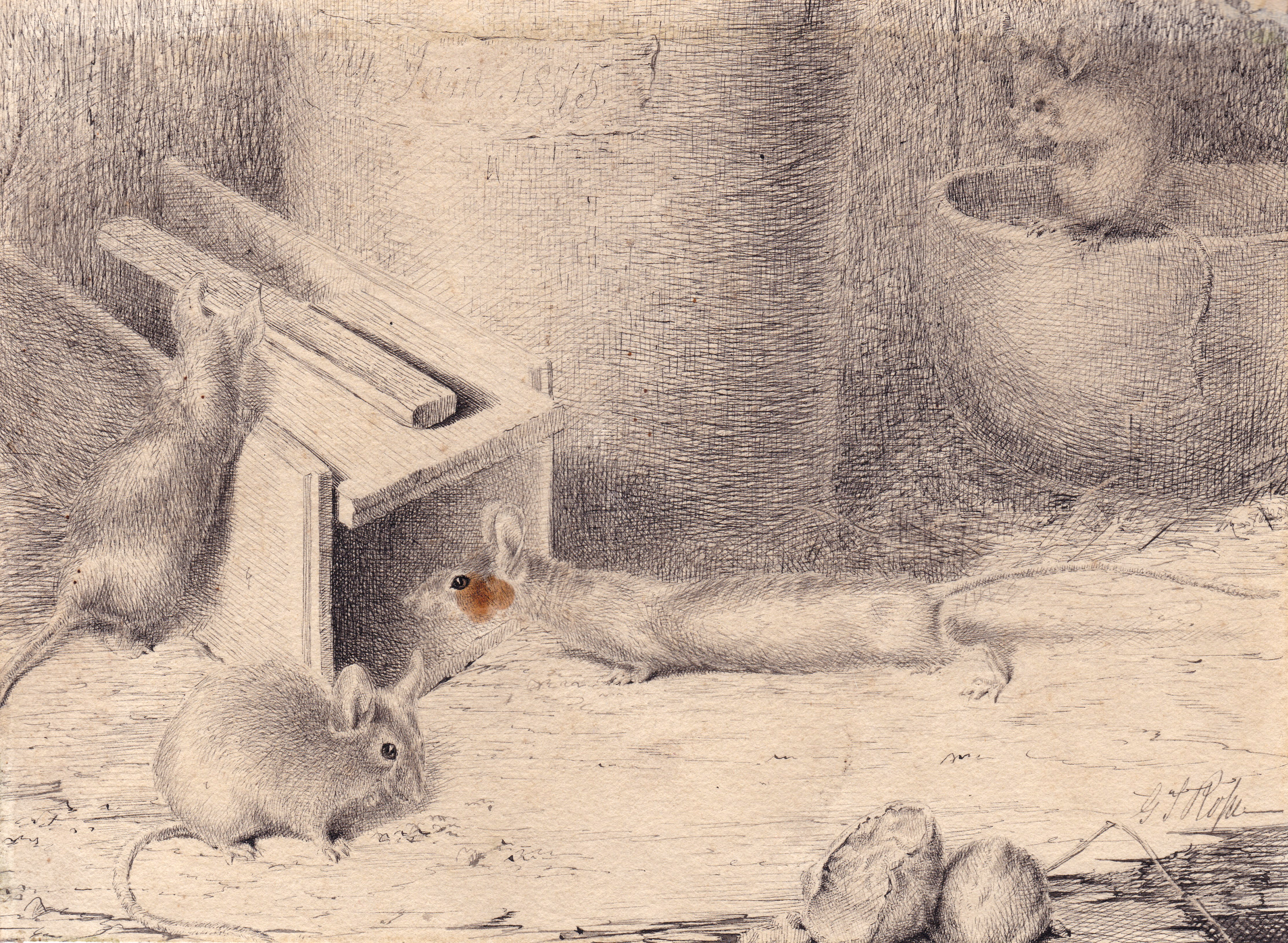
Pencil sketch

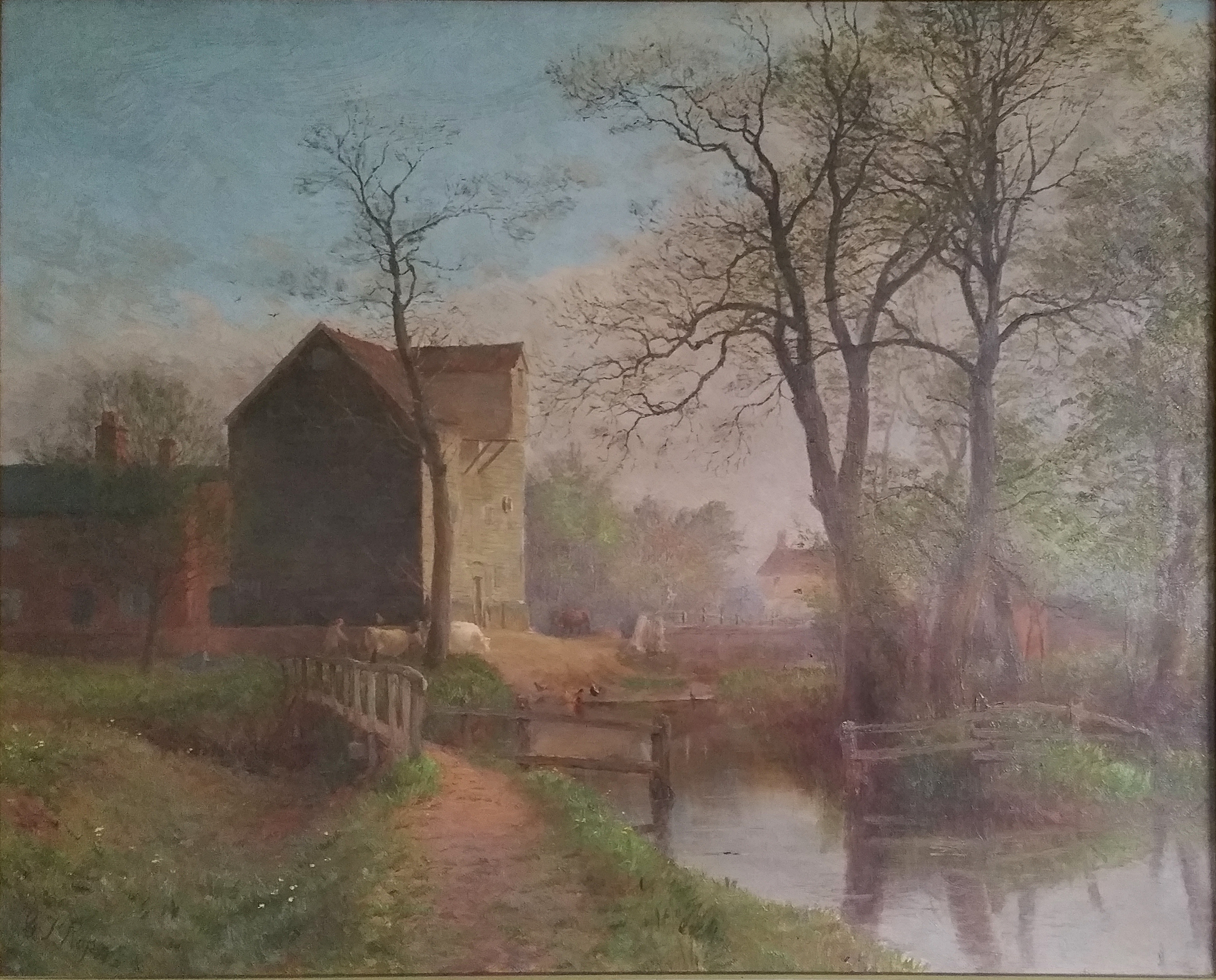
Oil painting

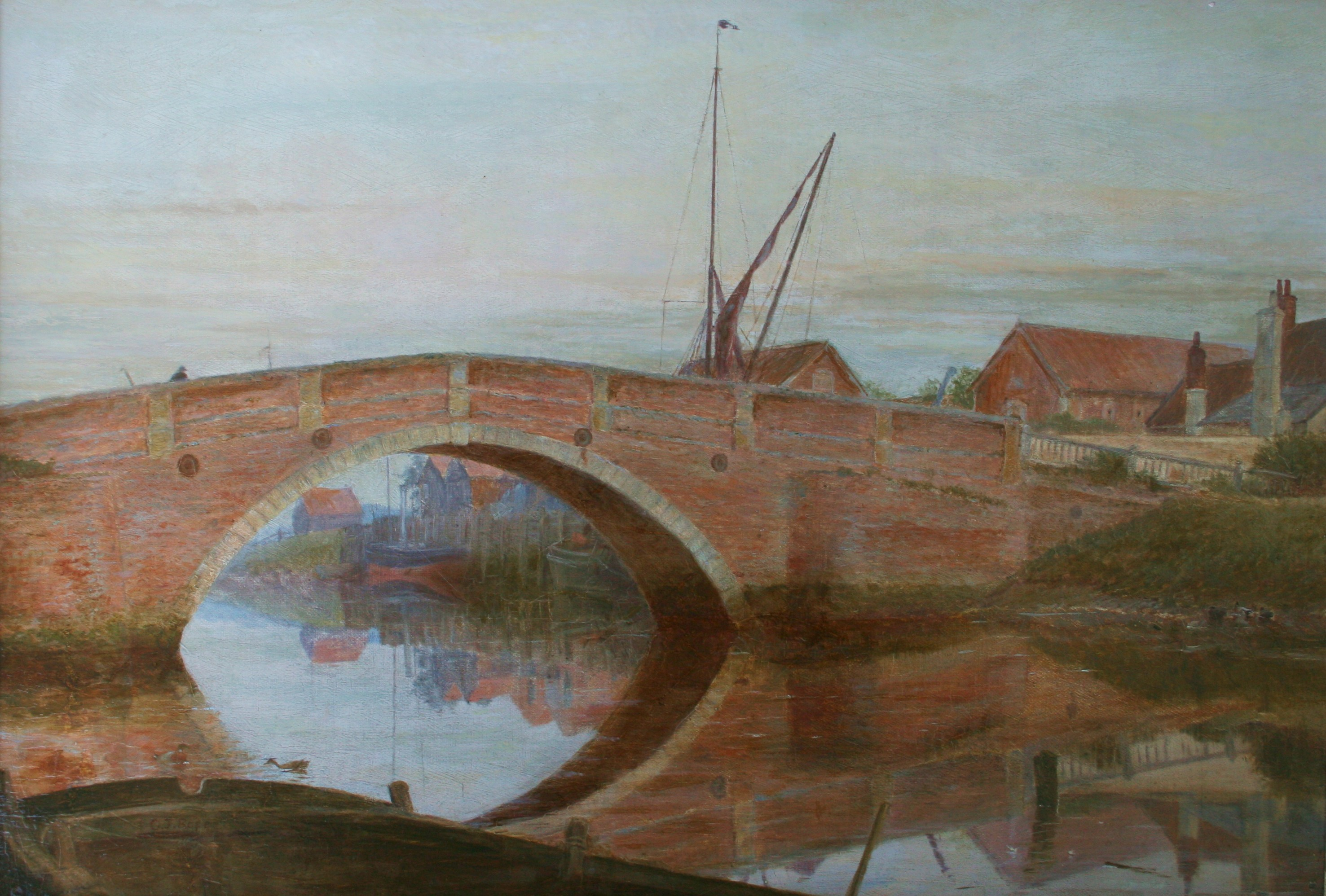
Oil painting

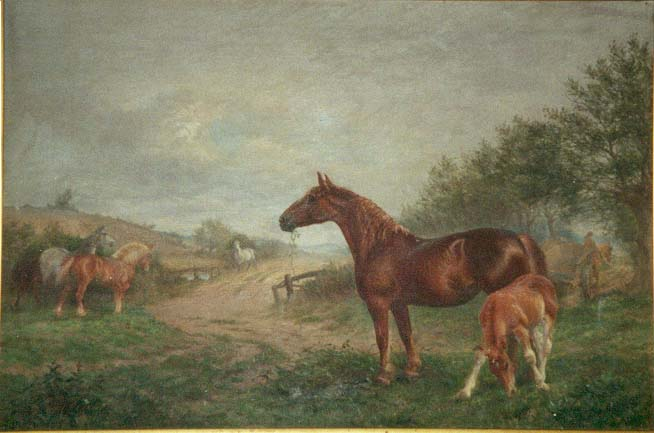
Oil painting

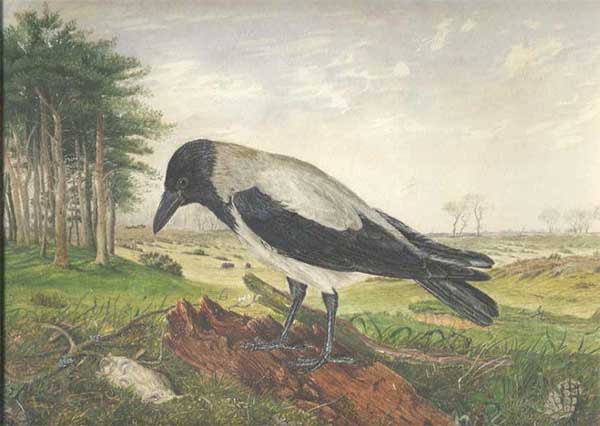
Watercolour painting

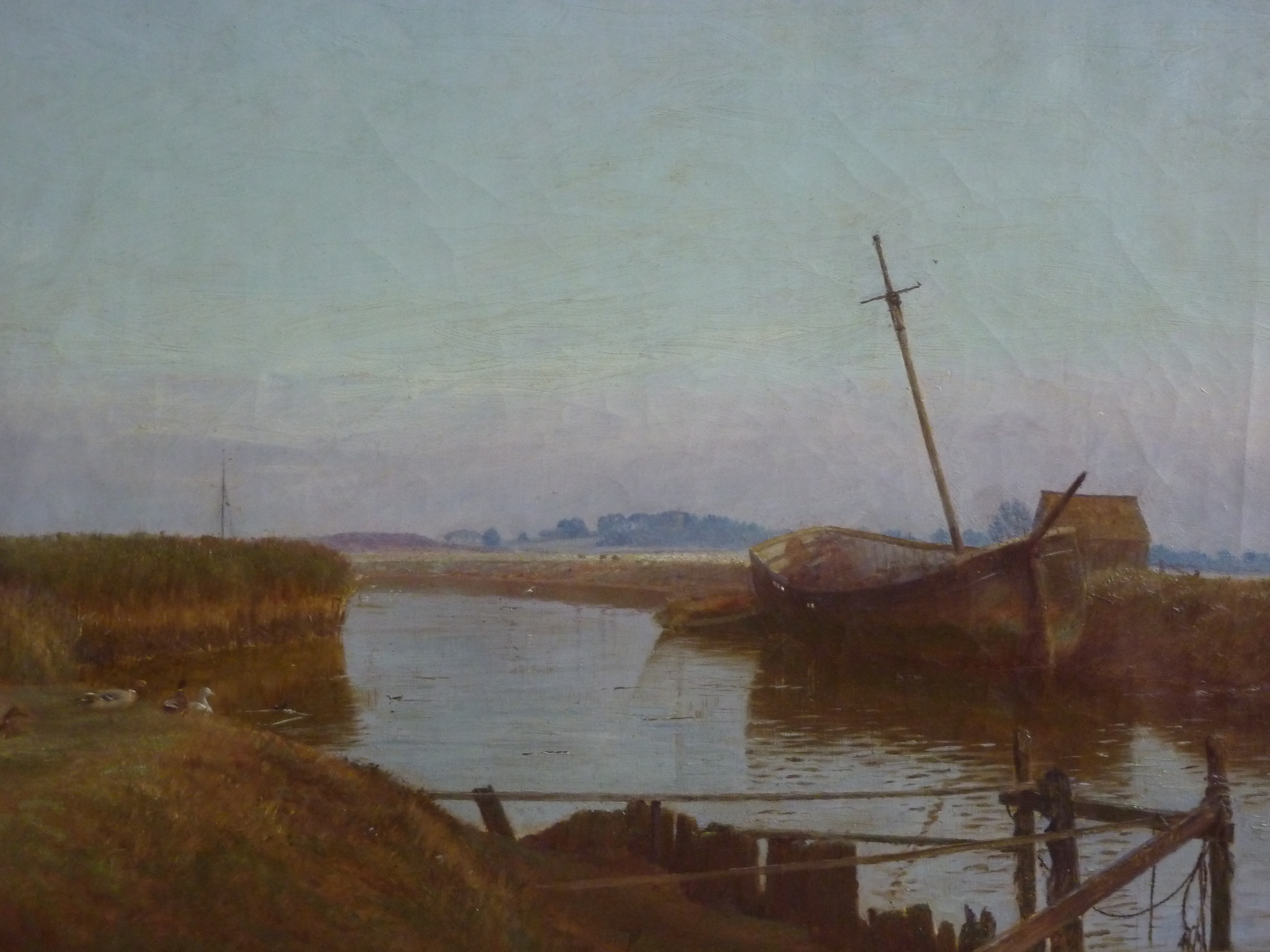
Oil Painting

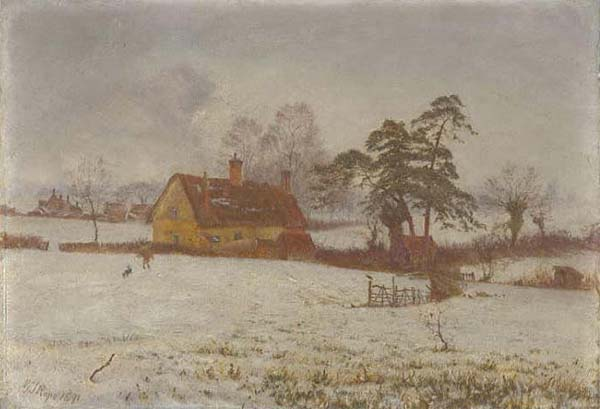
Oil painting

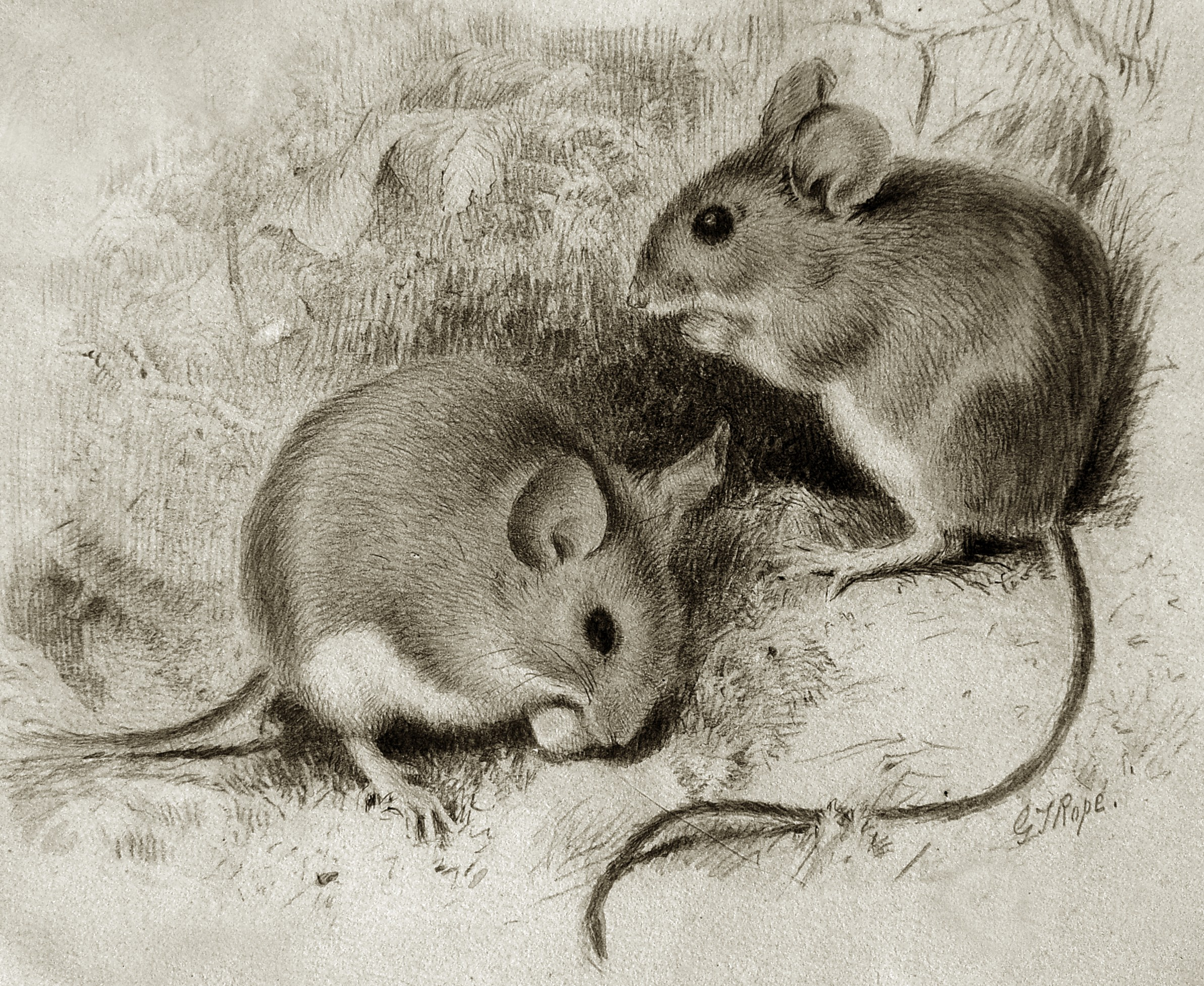
Pencil sketch

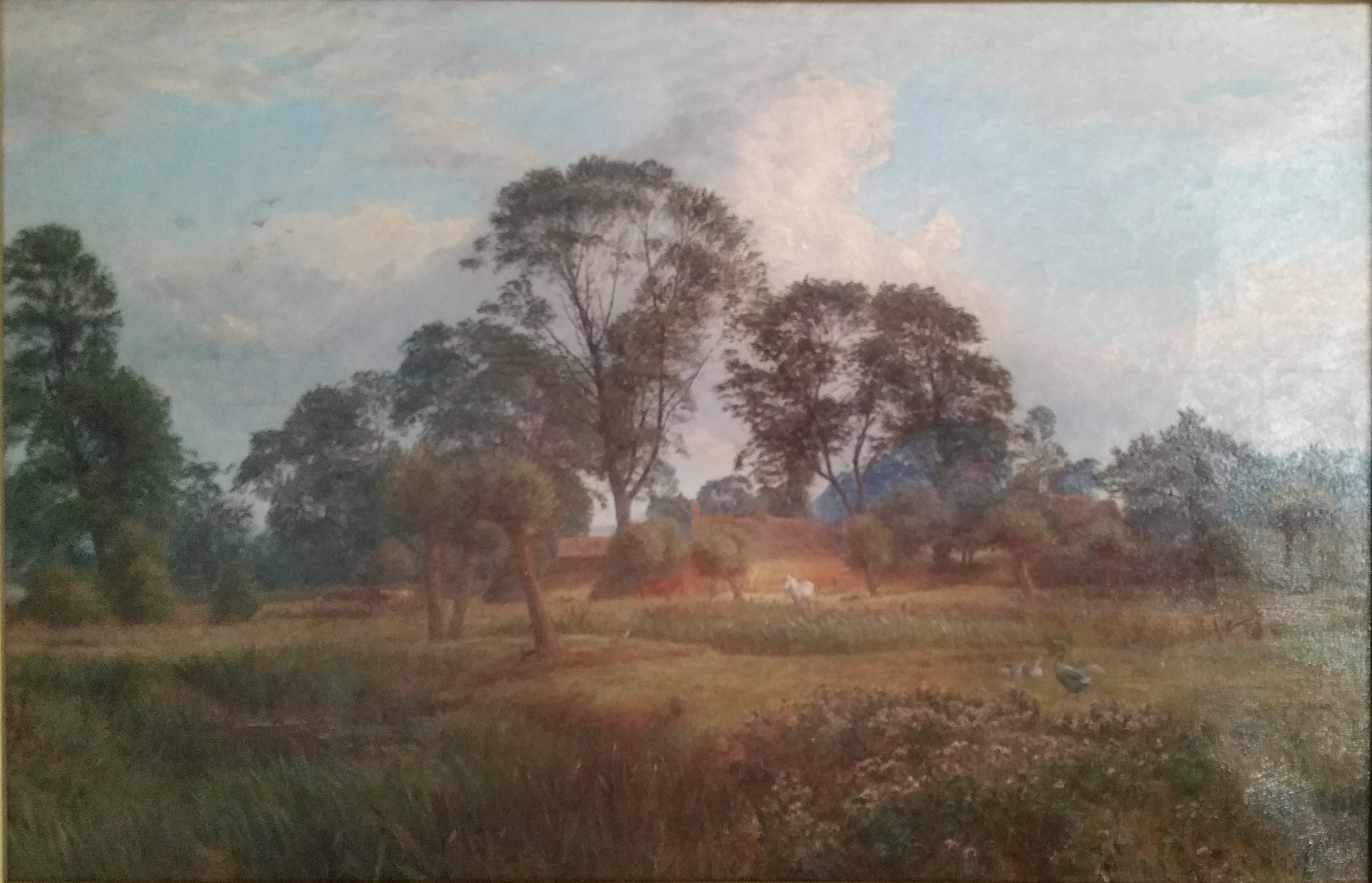
Oil painting

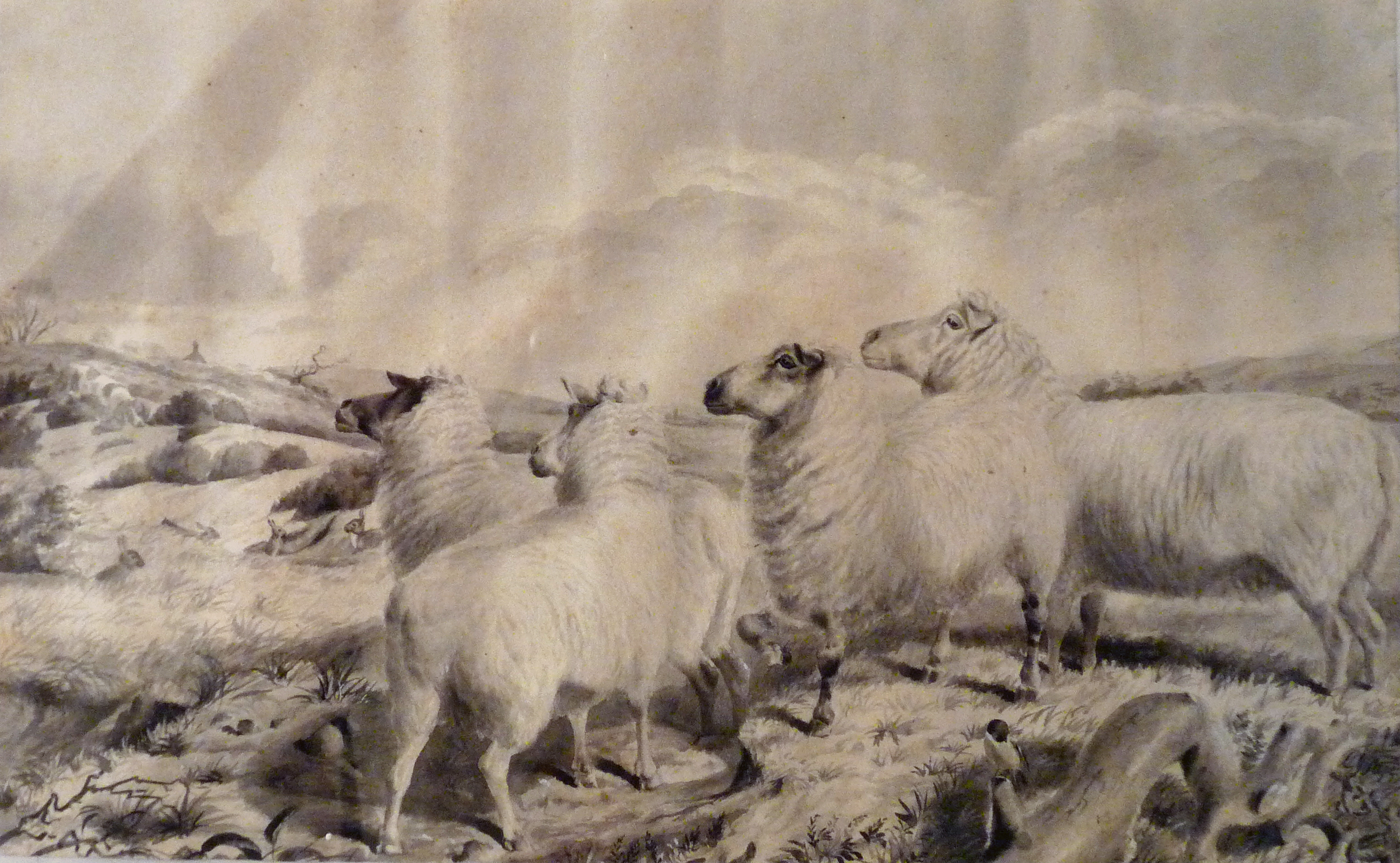
Monochrome wash painting

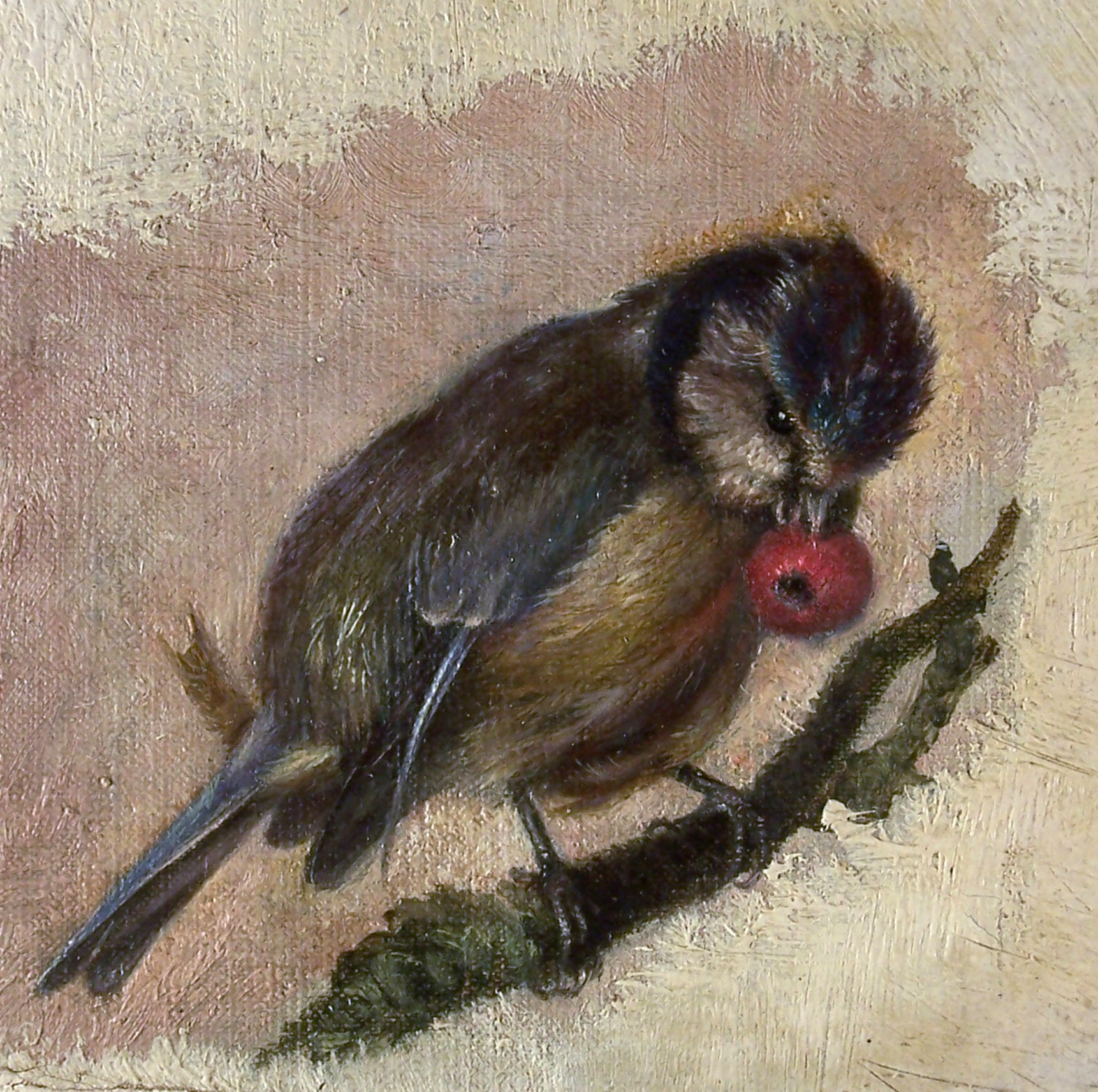
Oil painting

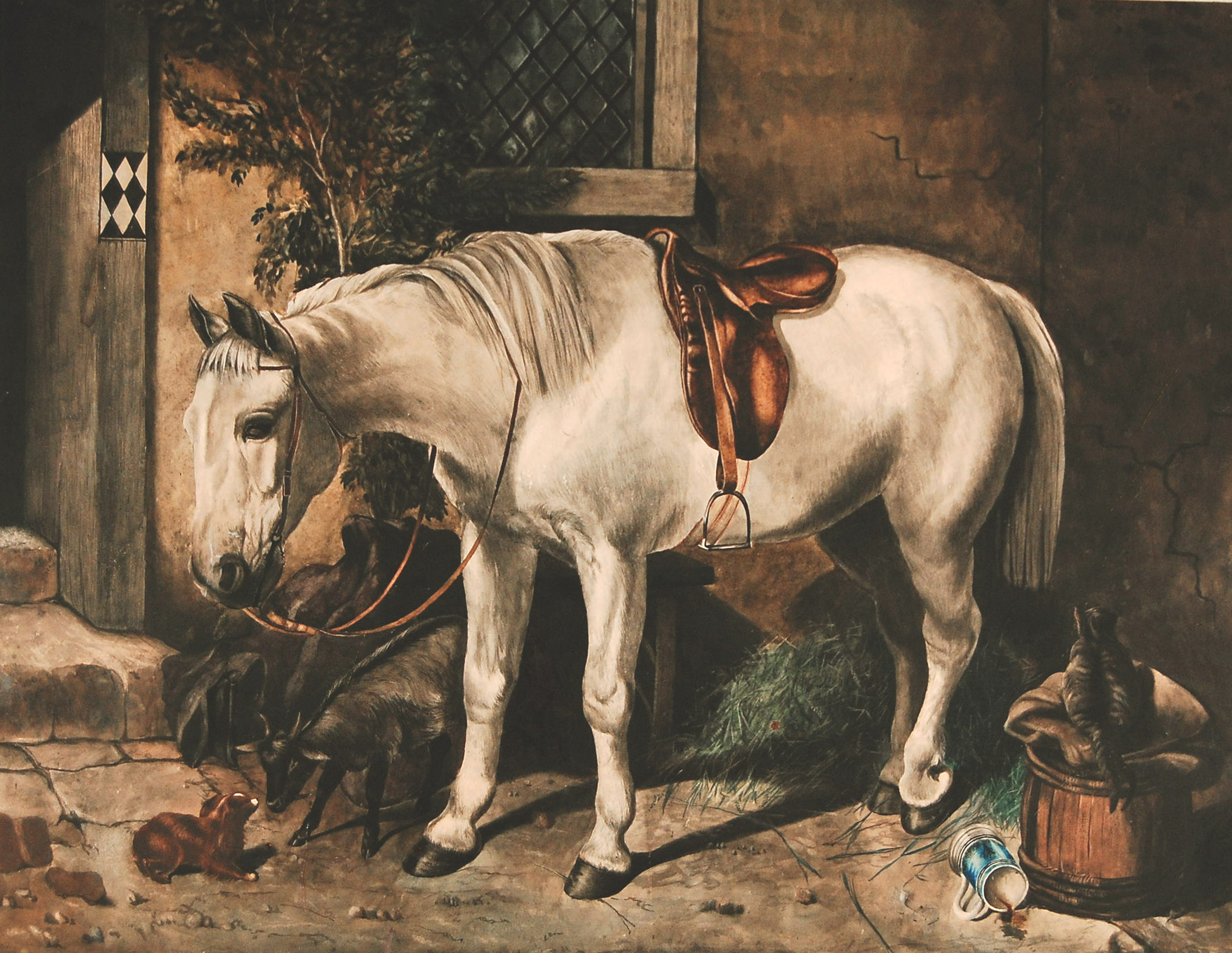
Watercolour

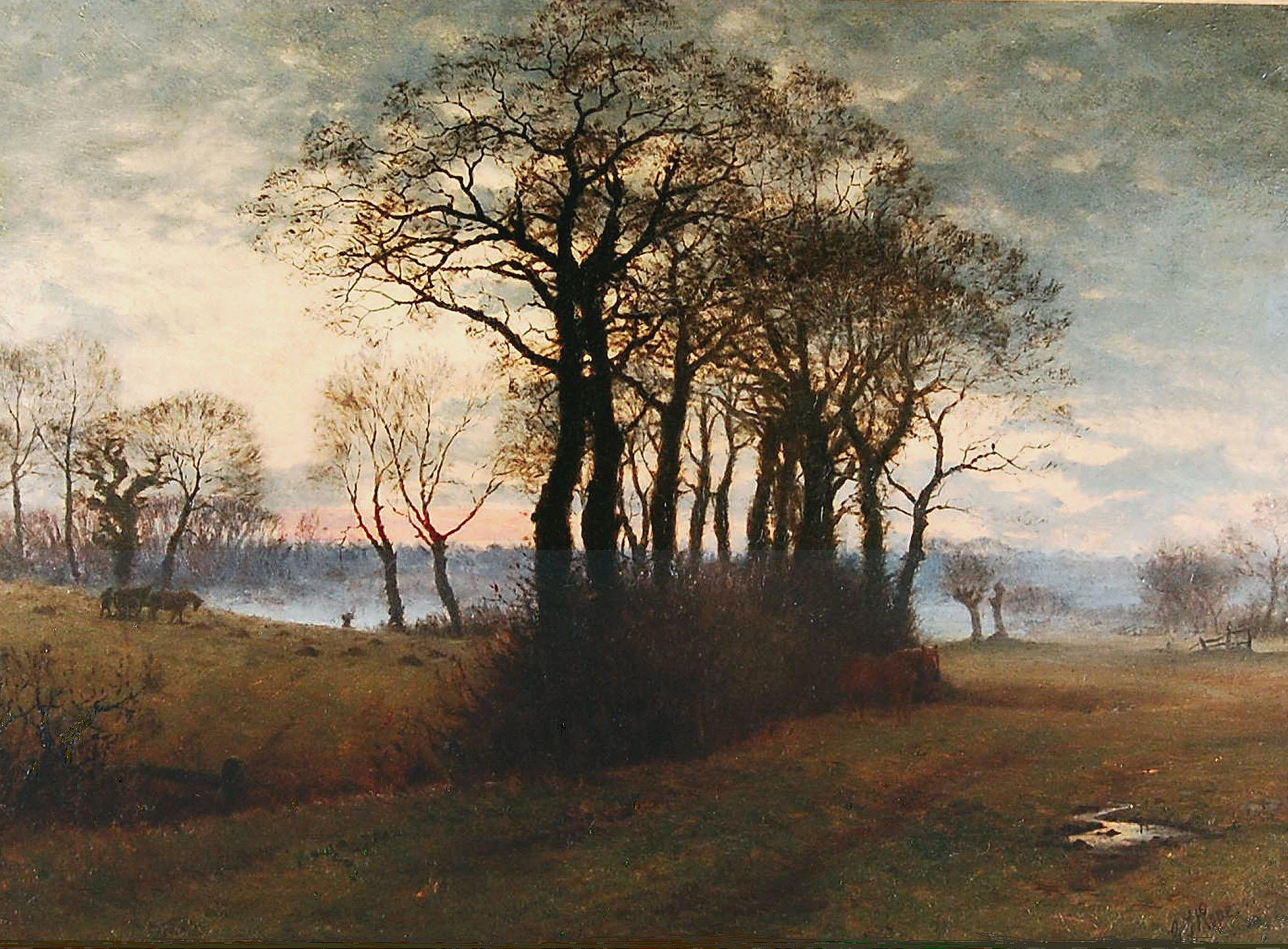
Oil painting

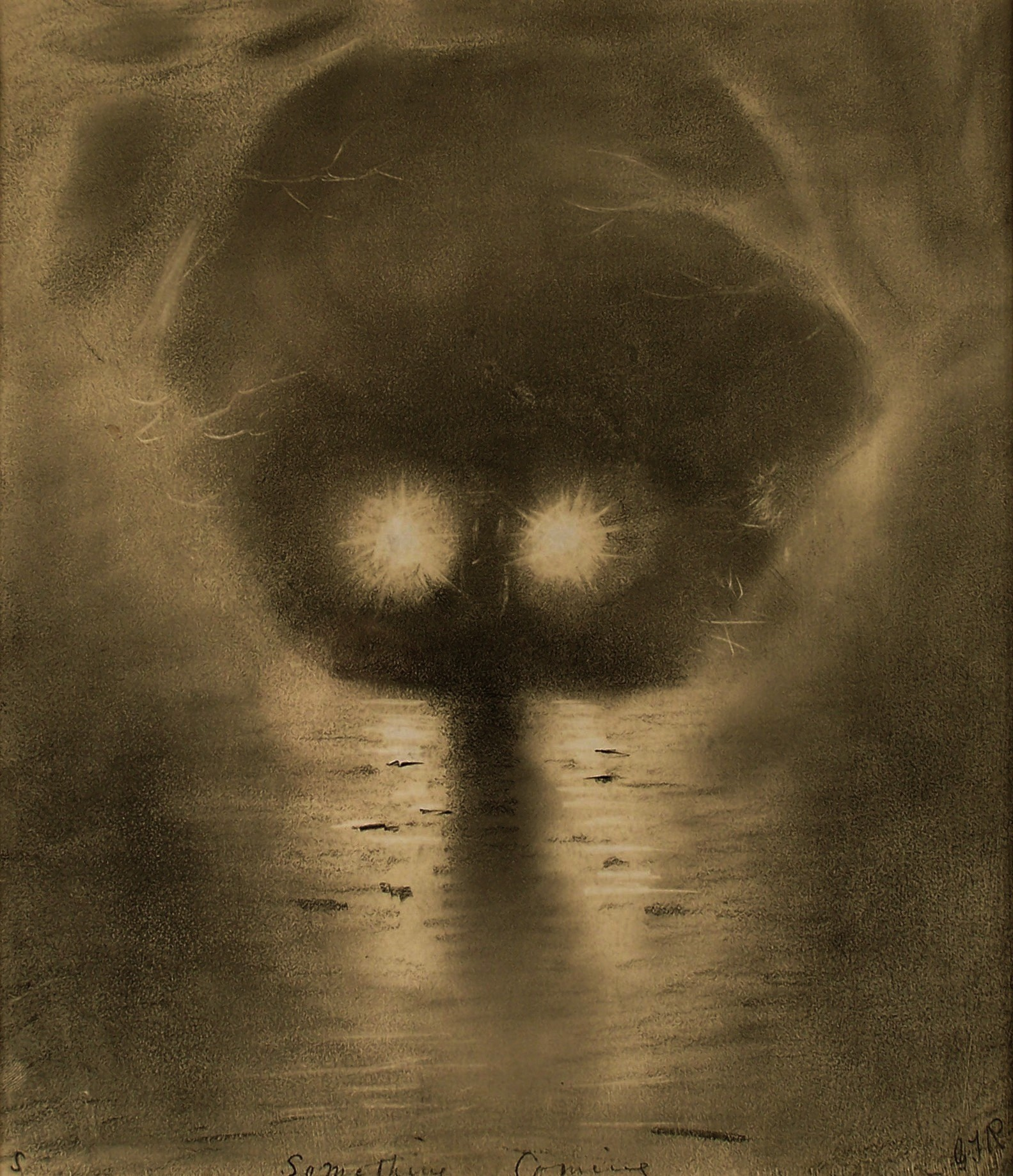
Sepia and wash

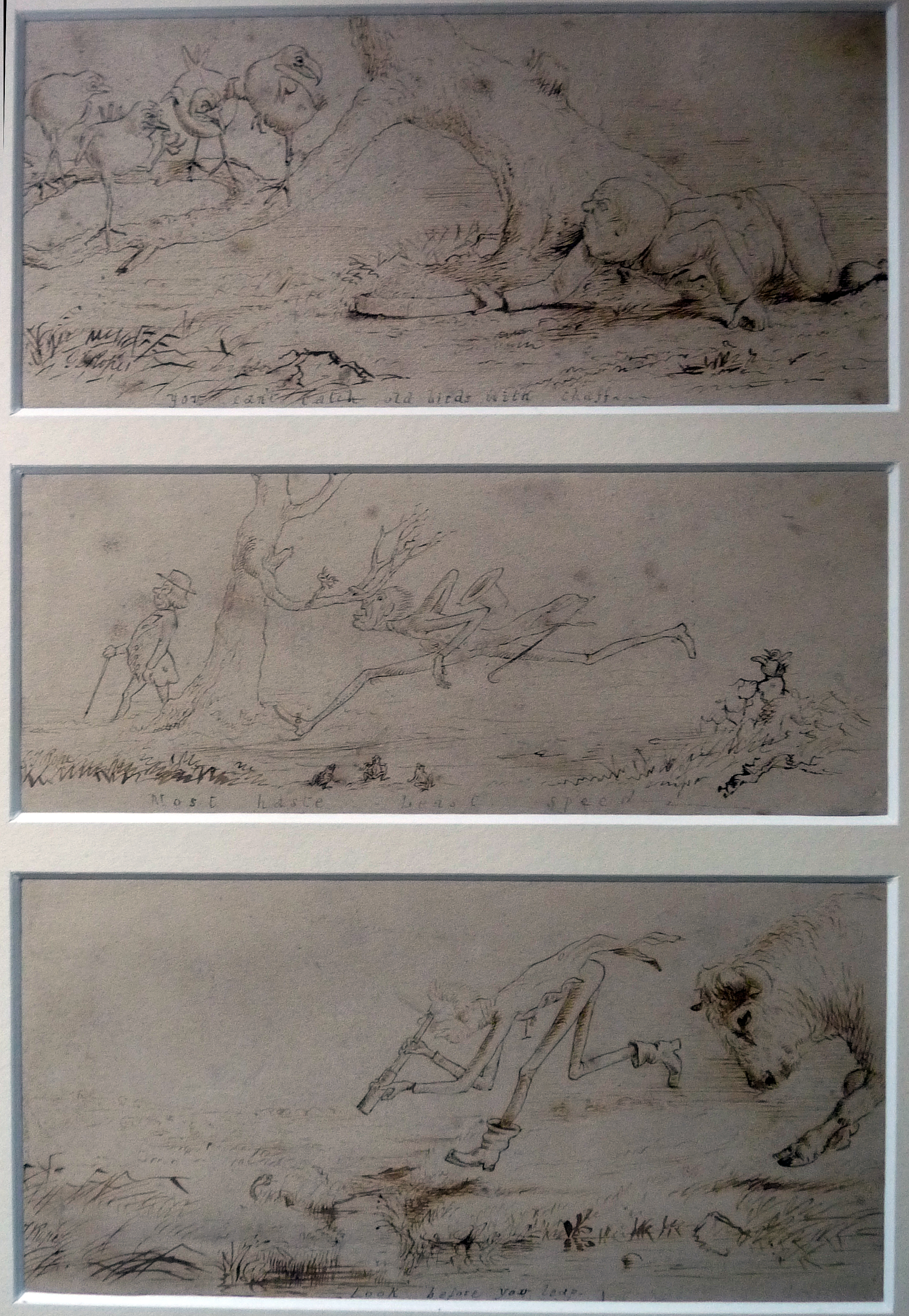
3 ink drawings (humorous)
