= M. E. Aldrich Rope =

English stained-glass artist (1891–1988)

- Born: 29 July 1891; Leiston, Suffolk, England
- Died: 9 March 1988 (aged 96); Bungay, Suffolk, England
- Education: Chelsea School of Art and LCC Central School of Arts & Crafts
- Known for: Stained glass

Margaret Edith Rope, known as M. E. Aldrich Rope (29 July 1891 – 9 March 1988) was an English stained-glass artist in the Arts and Crafts movement tradition active between 1910 and 1964. She was a cousin of Margaret Agnes Rope of Shrewsbury, another English stained-glass artist in the same tradition active from 1910 until the Second World War. By comparison, she was the more prolific as an artist, with an approach that evolved in her later years from a recognisable Arts and Crafts school style into something simpler and more modern.

== Life ==
Margaret Agnes Rope and Margaret Edith Rope were cousins, sharing a grandfather, George Rope of Grove Farm, Blaxhall, Suffolk (1814–1912) and grandmother, Anne (née Pope) (1821–1882). The younger Margaret was the fifth child of Arthur Mingay Rope (himself George and Anne's fifth child: 1850–1945) and Agnes Maud (née Aldrich: 1855–1943), born on 29 July 1891. She had a number of artistic relatives in Leiston and Blaxhall, Suffolk. Apart from her cousin Margaret Agnes Rope, she had an uncle, George Thomas Rope, R. A., a landscape painter and naturalist, an aunt Ellen Mary Rope, sculptor, and a sister Dorothy, another sculptor. Another cousin was Henry Edward George Rope, later to become a prominent Roman Catholic priest, writer and archivist. Her nickname in the family was "Tor", for tortoise, and she used a tortoise to sign some of her windows, particularly in her later years.

Rope was educated at Wimbledon High School, Chelsea School of Art, and the LCC Central School of Arts and Crafts, where she specialised in stained glass under Karl Parsons and Alfred Drury. From about 1911, she worked at The Glass House (Fulham) with her cousin, Margaret Agnes Rope. For example, they worked together on the set of windows for SS Peter and Paul, Newport, Shropshire. To distinguish herself from her namesake cousin, she used the professional name of M. E. Aldrich Rope (incorporating her mother's maiden name) or M. E. A. Rope. One of her friends was J. Harold Gibbons (church architect) and this connection led to her first major commission for St Chad's Church, Far Headingley, Leeds, which is among her greatest works.

Rope joined the Women's Land Army in World War I.

For much of her active artistic life she lived in various houses in Deodar Road, Putney, which was something of an artists' colony in that period. Around 1926 she moved to No. 61, also occupied by stained glass artists Caroline Townshend and Joan Howson. She was a close friend of stained glass artist Wilhelmina Geddes.

Later, during World War II, she moved to No. 81, until it was bombed. She also cared for evacuee children at three hospitals in North Wales during World War II with Townshend & Howson, before moving to Storrington in Sussex.

In the post-war period she was at No. 89, where she had a studio, workshop and kiln (also used by Rachel de Montmorency). She shared the house with Clare Dawson, a friend and pupil. Late in life, she became a Roman Catholic. In mid-1978, at the age of 87, she left Putney and returned to live on the family farm in Suffolk. She died on 9 March 1988, aged 96, having suffered a protracted period of Alzheimer's disease.

== Works ==
Spanning a period of over 50 years, her artistic production was largely destined for Anglican churches (especially Anglo-Catholic), with a few Roman Catholic ones as well. Listed first are windows in the United Kingdom, followed by those in other countries, in alphabetical order of county or country. Inaccessible windows have been omitted. Asterisks indicate windows of particular importance.

Location	Details	Notes
Buckinghamshire: Edlesborough St Mary	Nativity 2 lights 1933	
Buckinghamshire: Lane End, Holy Trinity	Annunciation and Nativity 1 light	
Cambridgeshire: Ely, Cathedral Stained Glass Museum	Visitation, Franciscan Boy and A Vision of Heaven (2 panels)	
Cambridgeshire: Ickleton, St Mary Magdalene	Crucifixion with SS.Mary Magdalene and Etheldreda (3 lights, e; 1929)	**
Cambridgeshire: Molesworth, S.Peter	Christ in Majesty with Nativity, Crucifixion &c (3 lights, e; 1929)	**
Clwyd: Wrexham, Holy Trinity	2-light window 1950	
Cornwell:Polperro, St John the Baptist	"No man cometh ..." (1956)	
Cornwell: Polperro, St John the Baptist	Jesus and disciples (1959–60)	**
Derbyshire: Chesterfield, St Mary and All Saints	Good Samaritan with Virgin and Child 1953 (3 lights)	
Dorset:Bournemouth, Moordown, St John the Baptist	2 lancets: Florence Nightingale, Edward Jenner	
Dorset: Hinton Martel, St John	Eight panel painted screen	
Durham: Roker, St Andrew	Mural, walls and ceiling with Macdonald Gill)	
Hampshire: Hartley Wintney, St John the Evangelist	Carol themes(4 lights,1939)	
Herefordshire: Hereford, All Saints	Expulsion from Eden, Annunciation, Nativity, Crucifixion (4 lights 1933)	**
Herefordshire: Hereford, All Saints	Virgin and child with St Martin of Tours, St George (5 lights 1933)	**
Herefordshire: Hereford, All Saints	St Anthony the Hermit (3 lights 1947)	**
Herefordshire: Hereford, All Saints	Nativity with children (3 lights 1944)	**
Herefordshire:Hereford, All Saints	2 lancets: SS Joseph and David	**
Hertfordshire: Bishop's Stortford, St Michael	2 lancets in porch: SS Botolph and John of Beverley (1950)	
Kent: Whitstable, All Saints	SS Christopher & Anne (1927)	*
Lancashire: Royton, St Paul	Annunciation with Joseph and John the Baptist (3 lights 1929)	*
London: Bromley, SS Peter & Paul	4 lancets: the archangels	*
London: Bromley, SS Peter & Paul	East window (3 lights 1953)	*
London: Bromley, SS Peter & Paul	Te Deum (2 lights and rose 1959)	*
London: Chelsea, Bourne St, St Mary	Eight titles of Mary (rose window)	*
London: Chiswick, SS Peter & Paul	SS Peter & Paul, Life of St Peter, Life of St Paul(1955)	*
London: Dollis Hill, St Francis of Assissi, Gladstone Park	Ecce Agnus Dei	*
London: Dollis Hill, St Francis of Assissi, Gladstone Park	SS Dominic and Francis	*
London: Dollis Hill, St Francis of Assissi, Gladstone Park	St Clare	*
London: Fulham, All Saints Putney Bridge Road	Virgin and child, scenes from Jesus's early life (1938)	*
London: Grange, St Peter	8 clerestory windows (1957–60)	*
London: Grange, St Peter	4 chancel windows:life of Christ (1960–63)	**
London: Grange, St Peter	Lady chapel "Mary hath chosen that good part" (1957–60)	
London: Grange, St Peter	10 small Saints windows (1966–73)	*
London: Haggerston, St Saviour's Priory, entrance	SS Paul and Margaret originally in St Augustine, Haggerston, also depicting everyday scenes of east end life (1934)	***
London: Haggerston, St Saviour's Priory, chapel	3 windows: early life of Christ	*
London: Highgate, S.Augustine,	Nativity	**
London: Highgate, S.Augustine,	Christchild with birds	*
London:Highgate, S.Augustine,	Christ the King	
London: Munster Square, St Mary Magdalene crypt	6 Saints windows from St Augustine, Haggerston	***
London: Munster Square, St Mary Magdalene crypt	Coronation of BVM, Mary and child	*
London: Northolt Park, St Barnabas	East window (1954)	*
London: Northolt Park, St Barnabas	West window (1957)	*
London: Victoria and Albert Museum	Small panels: Nativity	*
London: Victoria and Albert Museum	Roundel: St Anthony preaching to fishes	*
London: Putney, Christ the King Polish church	Nativity: 3 lights (1951)	*
London: Wapping Lane, St Peter, London Docks	Rose window with bells of London	**
London: Wapping Lane, St Peter London Docks	2 lancewts: SS.Peter & Paul (1949)	
London:Wapping Lane, St Peter London Docks	Good Shepherd, 3 lights (1954)	**
London: Wapping Lane, St Peter London Docks	4 circular lights: 1st 4 vicars	*
London: Wapping Lane, St Peter London Docks	7 Sacrament windows ex Haggerston	***
Manchester: Ardwick, St Benedict (now deconsecrated)	Window in Lady Chapel, 3 lights	
Manchester: Ardwick, St Benedict (now deconsecrated)	Lancet:St Francis (1935)	*
Norfolk: Clippesby, St Peter	Suffer little children (1919)	See Gallery
Norfolk: Quidenham, Carmelite Monastery	16 clerestory windows designed by cousin	*
Norfolk: Quidenham, Carmelite Monastery	7 roundels designed by cousin	*
Oxfordshire: Oxford, SS Mary and John, Cowley Road	3 lights "Bread from heaven"	*
Oxfordshire: Oxford, SS Mary and John, Cowley Road	Lancet: Virgin and child	*
Shropshire: Wistanstow, Holy Trinity	2 lancets: SS Wistan and Anne	*
Somerset:Bicknoller, St George	Life of St Paul(1952)	*
Stirlingshire: Falkirk	3 lights, Virgin and child (1929)	
Stirlingshire: Falkirk	4 minor windows largely decorative (c. 1935)	
Suffolk: Barnby, St John the Baptist	East window (1963)	***
Suffolk: Barnby, St John the Baptist	4 painted roundels	*
Suffolk: Blaxhall, St Peter	Porch window (with cousin)	** See Gallery
Suffolk: Chediston, St Mary	SS George and Felix (1947)	
Suffolk: Earl Soham, St Mary	2 lights, SS Edmund and Felix	*
Suffolk: Kesgrave, Holy Family and St Michael	3 English Catholic martyrs	* See Gallery
Suffolk: Kesgrave, Holy Family and St Michael	Virgin & child, Walsingham (with Clare Dawson)	*
Suffolk: Leiston, St Margaret	3 lights, St Luke	**
Suffolk: Leiston, St Margaret	3 lights, St Matthew	** See Gallery
Suffolk: Little Glemham, St Andrew	Nativity with Gospel episodes)	**
Sussex: Bolney, St Mary Magdalene	Holy Sacraments, 1 light (1947)	
Sussex: Chichester, former Bishop Otter College	2 lancets, St Francis	*
Warwickshire: Coventry, St John	Expulsion from Eden, Annunciation	*** See Gallery
Warwickshire: Leamington Spa, St Mary	S.Mary and the risen Christ	**
Wiltshire: Lydiard Millicent, All Saints	"All ye works of the Lord" (1963)	**
Yorkshire: Leeds, St Chad, Far Headingly	Creation (1922)	*** See Gallery
Australia: Geraldton, WA, St Francis Xavier Cathedral	two windows	
Australia: Mullewa, WA, Our Lady of Carmel and SS Peter and Paul	Gloria in excelsis	
Australia: Mullewa, WA, Our Lady of Carmel and SS Peter & Paul	Pater Mi, Pater Mi (1923)	
Malta: Sliema, Holy Trinity	St George (1947)	
S.Africa, Ofcolaco	2 lights (1951)	
Sri Lanka: Passara, St Barnabas	2 lights (1953)	
Trinidad: Port of Spain, St James the Just, Sangre Grande	originally 5 windows, some now lost	

== Gallery ==
Creation window, S.Chad, Far Headingley, Leeds, 1923

Detail from the Creation window, S.Chad, Far Headingley, Leeds, 1923: Left hand light

Detail from the Creation window, S.Chad, Far Headingley, Leeds, 1923

Detail from the Creation window, S.Chad, Far Headingley, Leeds, 1923: Right hand light

Detail from the Creation window, S.Chad, Far Headingley, Leeds, 1923: Adam & Eve

Detail from the Creation window, S.Chad, Far Headingley, Leeds, 1923:Deer in Paradise

Window by M. E. Aldrich Rope (left) and Margaret Agnes Rope (right) in the period when they shared a studio at the Glass House

S.Matthew window in S.Margaret, Leiston, Suffolk, memorial to her parents

Detail from S.Matthew window in S.Margaret, Leiston, Suffolk, showing the Minsmere marshes and ruined chapel

Detail from S.Matthew window in S.Margaret, Leiston, Suffolk, showing her childhood home, Lower Abbey Farm, Leiston, Suffolk

S.Peter, Clippesby: Detail of "Suffer little children to come unto me" (first commission, 1919)

3 local English Catholic martyrs, a theme more typical of Margaret Agnes Rope, at Kesgrave Catholic church, near Ipswich, Suffolk

East window, S.John, Coventry, Warwickshire, a late large commission: lower half - "As in Adam all die"

East window, S.John, Coventry, Warwickshire, a late large commission: upper half - Annunciation

Student piece: Dick Whittington
