= Nathaniel Ropes Building =

- U.S. National Register of Historic Places
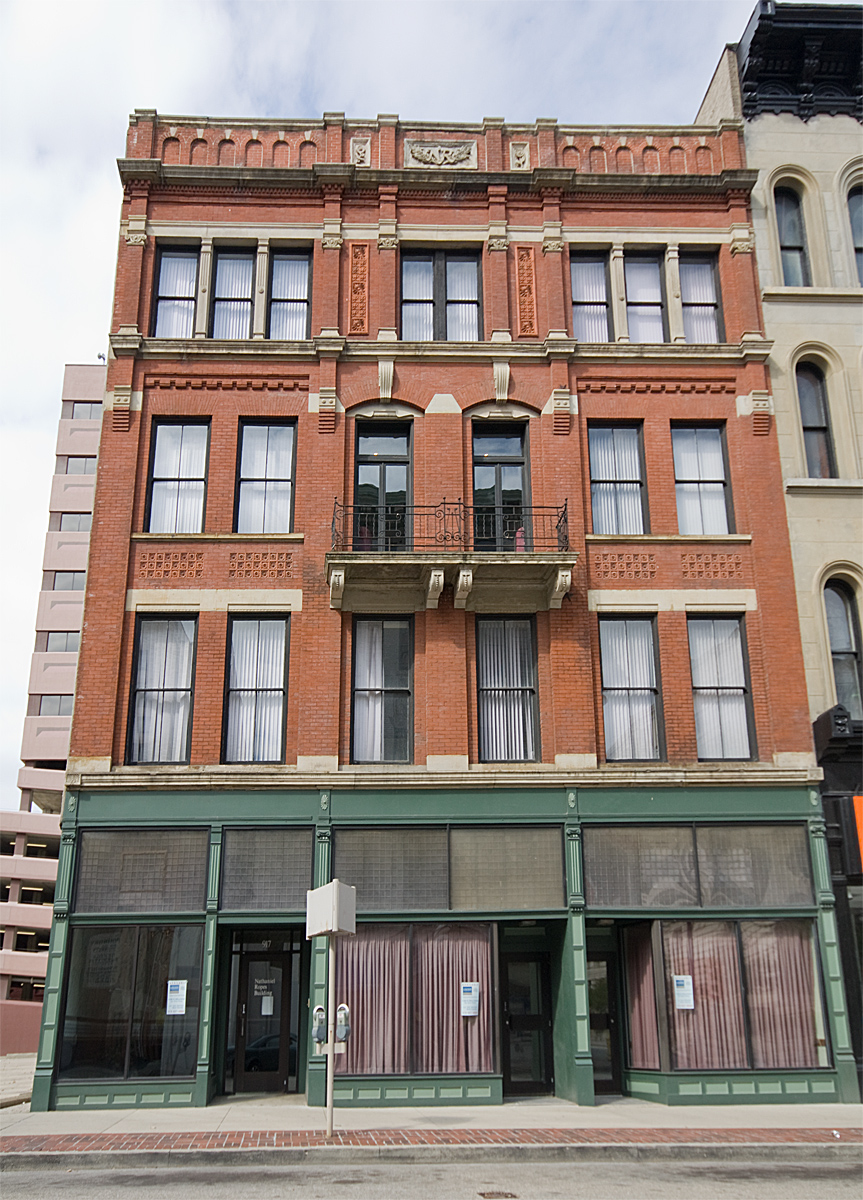
- Front of the Ropes Building

- Location within Ohio Location within the United States
- Location: 917 Main St., Cincinnati, Ohio
- Coordinates: 39°6′22″N 84°30′40″W
- Area: less than one acre
- Built: 1882
- Architectural style: Queen Anne
- NRHP reference No.: 82003585
- Added to NRHP: September 30, 1982

The Nathaniel Ropes Building is a historic commercial building in downtown Cincinnati, Ohio, United States. Located on Main Street near the Hamilton County Courthouse, this 1882 building has been named a historic site.

Nathaniel Ropes founded a company to manufacture lard, candles, and other oil-based products in the first half of the nineteenth century. In 1844, he bought a piece of property in what is now the 900 block of Main Street in downtown Cincinnati, and upon this lot he erected a frame building. This structure stood for twenty-seven years; it was replaced by a larger structure in 1871, and this building in turn was removed for the construction of the present edifice. Ropes appears to have arranged for the building's construction for investment purposes; it was erected only after he had bought 11 feet (3.4 m) of land on the southern edge of his original lot, and none of the buildings at the site appear ever to have housed Ropes' business.

The Ropes Building is a brick structure that features elements of sandstone and iron in its construction. Many ornate details characterize its facade, such as variations in the materials used and in the shapes of elements of all types, which combine to form a fine example of the Queen Anne style of architecture. Because of its well-preserved historic architecture, which also aids in distinguishing a group of adjacent commercial buildings, the Nathaniel Ropes Building was listed on the National Register of Historic Places in 1982.
