= Rope (play) =

1929 play by Patrick Hamilton

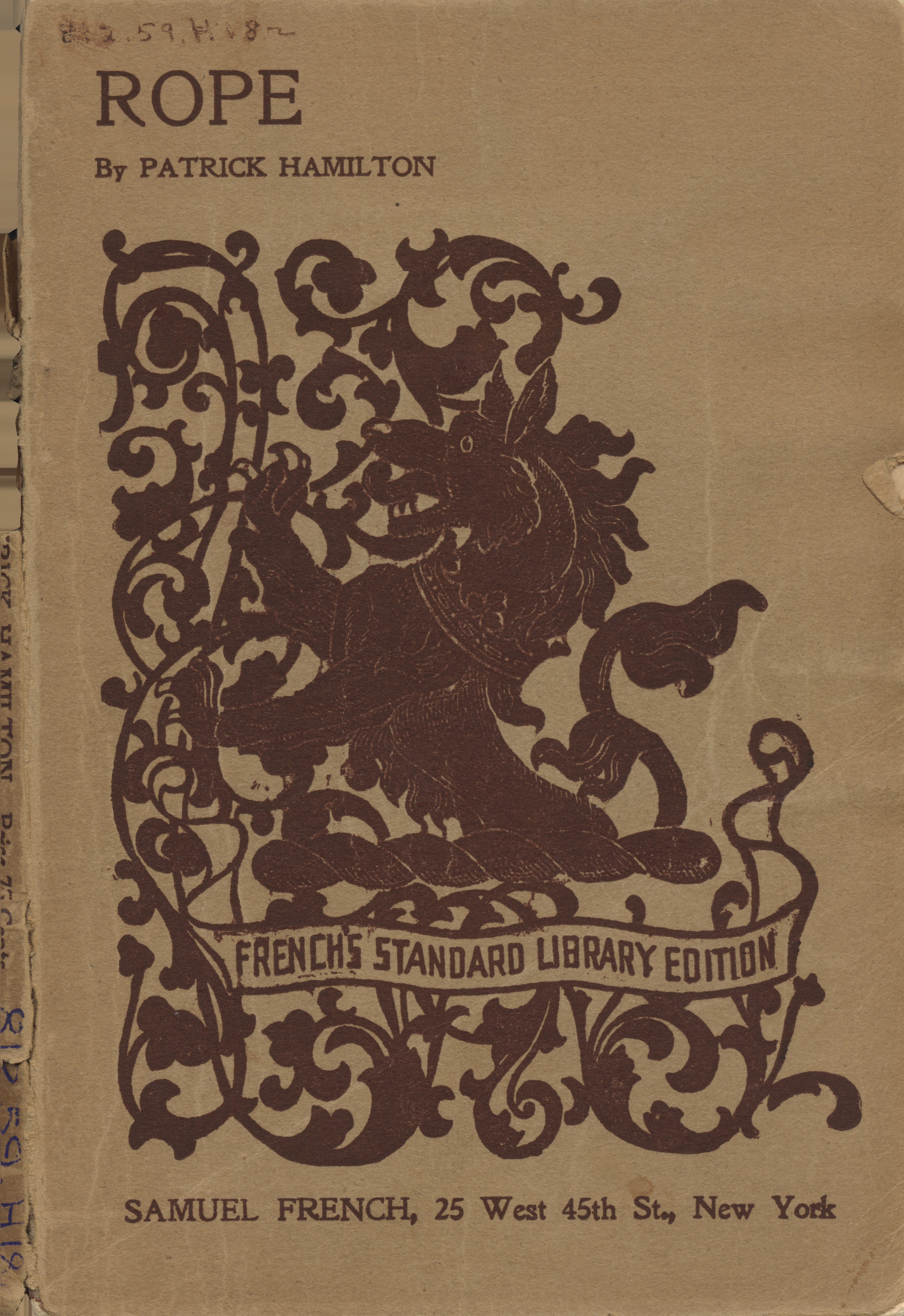
Cover of the 1929 US edition, published by Samuel French.

Rope, retitled Rope's End for its American release, is a 1929 English play by Patrick Hamilton. It was said to be inspired by the real-life murder of 14-year-old Bobby Franks in 1924 by University of Chicago students Nathan Leopold and Richard Loeb.

In formal terms, it is a well-made play with a three-act dramatic structure that adheres to the classical unities. Its action is continuous, punctuated only by the curtain fall at the end of each act. It may also be considered a thriller. Samuel French published the play in 1929.

The play serves as the basis for Alfred Hitchcock's film of the same title.

== Plot ==
The play is set on the first floor of a house in Mayfair, London in 1929. The story concerns two young university students, Wyndham Brandon and Charles Granillo (whom Brandon calls "Granno"), who have murdered fellow student Ronald Kentley as an expression of their supposed intellectual superiority. At the beginning of the play, they hide Kentley's body in a chest. They proceed to host a party for his friends and family at which the locked chest containing his corpse is used to serve a buffet. Suspicion arises among the guests as to the content of the chest, but the murderers are able to send everyone home with eased suspicions, except for one guest, Rupert Cadell, their former professor. After the party, Rupert returns and contrives to open the chest. He is shocked and ashamed that they have acted in response to his own declarations of amorality. He reveals that he has obtained a whistle from a policeman who is waiting nearby for him to blow the whistle and alert him. The play ends with the whistle being blown, and their quandary unresolved.

== Production history ==
Rope was first presented by The Repertory Players in a Sunday night try-out production at the Strand Theatre, London, on 3 March 1929. The following month the play opened in the West End at the Ambassadors Theatre on 25 April 1929. The production ran for six months. Retitled Rope's End, the first Broadway production opened at the John Golden Theatre (then called the Theatre Masque) on 13 September 1929.

On 16 December 2009, a revival of Rope began at the Almeida Theatre in London, in a production directed by Roger Michell. In 2026, a new adaptation of Rope by Gordon Greenberg and directed by Scott Elliott opened off-Broadway at the Theater at St. Clement's.

=== 1929 London productions ===
==== Strand Theatre ====
- Wyndham Brandon - Sebastian Shaw
- Charles Granillo - Anthony Ireland
- Sabot - Frederick Burtwell
- Kenneth Raglan - Hugh Dempster
- Leila Arden - Betty Schuster
- Sir Johnstone Kentley - Daniel Roe
- Mrs Debenham - Ruth Taylor
- Rupert Cadell - Robert Holmes

==== Ambassadors' Theatre ====
- Wyndham Brandon - Brian Aherne
- Charles Granillo - Anthony Ireland
- Sabot - Stafford Hilliard
- Kenneth Raglan - Patrick Waddington
- Leila Arden - Lilian Oldland
- Sir Johnstone Kentley - Paul Gill
- Mrs Debenham - Alix Frizell
- Rupert Cadell - Ernest Milton

Directed by Reginald Denham.

=== 1929 Broadway production ===
- Wyndham Brandon - Sebastian Shaw
- Charles Granillo - Ivan Brandt
- Sabot - John Trevor
- Kenneth Raglan - Hugh Dempster
- Leila Arden - Margaret Delamere
- Sir Johnstone Kentley - Samuels Lysons
- Mrs. Debenham - Nora Nicholson
- Rupert Cadell - Ernest Milton

Directed by Reginald Denham

=== 2009 London production ===
- Wyndham Brandon - Blake Ritson
- Charles Granillo - Alex Waldmann
- Kenneth Raglan - Henry Lloyd-Hughes
- Leila Arden - Phoebe Waller-Bridge
- Sir Johnstone Kentley - Michael Elwyn
- Mrs. Debenham - Emma Dewhurst
- Rupert Cadell - Bertie Carvel

Directed by Roger Michell

=== 2026 Off-Broadway production ===
- Nate Singer - Corey Fogelmanis
- Garrett Stern - Cameron Monaghan
- Richard Raglan - Graham Phillips
- Leila - Elizabeth Gillies
- Judge Kentley - James Waterston
- Rupert Cadell - Jason Butler Harner

Directed by Scott Elliott

== Film and TV adaptations ==
The play was first broadcast on experimental live television by the BBC, on 8 March 1939. It was adapted by Hamilton, produced by Dallas Bower, and used long takes. Director Alfred Hitchcock later said he saw (or heard about) the long takes of this television production and was inspired to attempt a feature film version. Another version was broadcast on the British commercial network ITV in 1957. In different roles, Dennis Price appeared in both versions. A version was made for Australian television in 1959, and aired as part of the series Shell Presents. A different version for Australian television aired in 1957.

In Alfred Hitchcock's 1948 film version, Rope, Hitchcock, Hume Cronyn, and Arthur Laurents made some changes to the original stage play. The setting is relocated to the 1940s New York City and the names of all of the characters, with the exception of Rupert Cadell, are altered. Quiet Mrs. Debenham became cheerful Mrs. Atwater. The murder victim is renamed David Kentley. In the original play, Rupert Cadell is a 29-year-old First World War veteran, who walks with a stick. He was a teacher of Brandon and Granillo when they were at school. In the film, Cadell is played by James Stewart, who was forty at the time. In this version, Cadell had been the teacher of Brandon Shaw, Philip Morgan, Kenneth Lawrence, and David Kentley, and is currently a publisher. Hitchcock's is the only feature film version of the play to date.

In 1983, Rope was dramatised as a BBC Radio 4 Drama for Saturday Night Theatre, starring Alan Rickman as Cadell.

== Homosexual subtext ==
An aspect of the play and its film adaptation that has become more discussed in recent decades is the probable homosexual subtext between Wyndham Brandon and Charles Granillo. While not explicitly named in the script due to homosexuality being a taboo subject at the time, many aspects of the plot and setting set up the duo as being in a relationship. Additionally, Leopold and Loeb, whose crimes inspired the play, were also in a homosexual relationship. Hitchcock's film adaptation made the relationship more visually obvious, while continuing to keep it unspoken.
