= Margaret Agnes Rope =

British stained glass artist

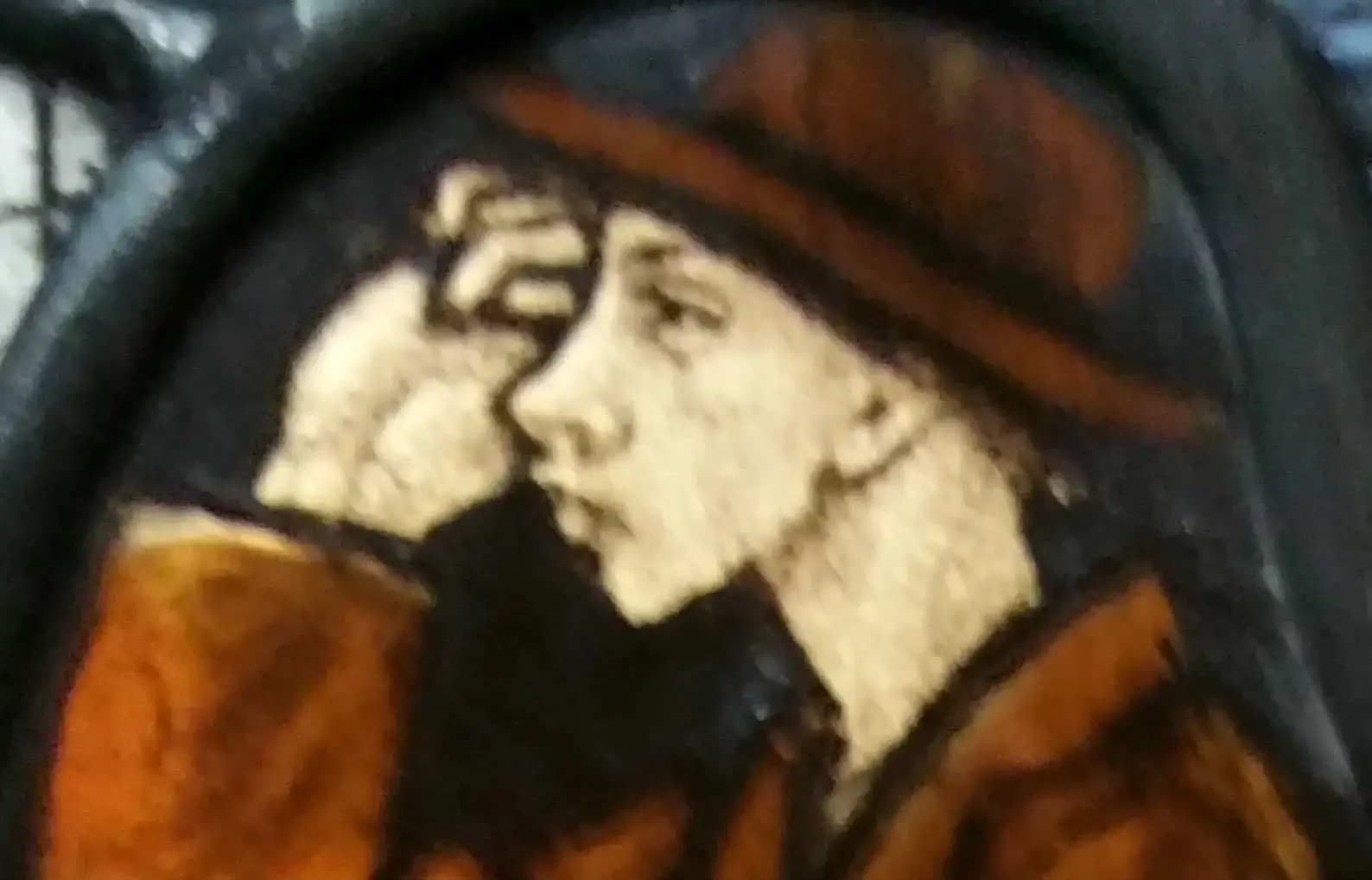
- Self-portrait
- Born: 20 June 1882; Shrewsbury, England
- Died: 6 December 1953 (aged 71); Quidenham, Norfolk, England
- Education: Birmingham Municipal School of Art
- Occupation: Artist
- Known for: Stained glass
- Notable work: Stained glass windows

Margaret Agnes Rope (20 June 1882 – 6 December 1953) was a British stained glass artist in the Arts and Crafts movement tradition active in the first four decades of the 20th century. Her work is notable for the intensity and skill of the painting and the religious fervour underpinning it. She should not be confused with her cousin, Margaret Edith Rope (known professionally as M. E. Aldrich Rope), another British stained glass artist in the same tradition, active from 1910 until the mid-1960s, with whom she cooperated on some windows.

== Biography ==
The two Margaret Ropes were first cousins, granddaughters of George Rope of Grove Farm, Blaxhall, Suffolk (1814–1912) and his wife Anne (née Pope) (1821–1882). The elder Margaret Rope, Margaret Agnes Rope, was the second child of Henry John Rope, M.D (1847–1899) and Agnes Maud (née Burd: 1857- 1948). "Marga" was her nickname. She was born on 20 June 1882 and christened Margaret Agnes at St Mary's Church, Shrewsbury on 7 July. Her elder brother was Henry Edward George Rope. It was an Anglican family but, soon after her husband's early death in 1899, her mother converted to Roman Catholicism (along with 5 of her 6 children). She brought her children up in some degree of poverty, exacerbated by her father's will, which denied money to any descendant "in religion". Of the children, two became nuns (herself and Monica) and one a priest (Fr. Harry Rope). Two other siblings were Irene Vaughan, a botanist, and Squadron Leader Michael Rope, an aeronautical engineer, who died in the R101 airship disaster. Only one, Denys, a doctor of medicine, continued as an Anglican, following his father.

She was educated at home until she went in 1900 to the Birmingham Municipal School of Art. Studies included enamelling and lettering. From 1901, she studied stained glass under Henry Payne. She had an illustrious career at the school including a number of scholarships, plus many awards in the National Competition for Schools of Art. In 1909, she left the school and worked from home (The Priory, Shrewsbury) especially on the large west window of Shrewsbury Cathedral, the first of seven she did there. From 1911, she worked (sometimes with her cousin M. E. Aldrich Rope and other artists such as Joseph Edward Nuttgens) at The Glass House (Fulham) until 1923 when, on 14 September, she became a Carmelite nun, Sister Margaret of the Mother of God. As a nun, she was first at Woodbridge, Suffolk, later at Rushmere, Ipswich, and, after the Second World War, at Quidenham Hall, Norfolk. At Woodbridge, she was able to continue her work, sending glass to and fro by train to the Glass House in Fulham for cutting, firing and leading up. This continued until 1939. After the war and the move to Quidenham, she was not well enough to do more than help with the designs for the windows for the monastery church, which were made by her cousin. She died on 6 December 1953 aged 71.

She is reputed to have been a strong character, smoking and motorbike-riding being among her pastimes before she took her vows. Much of her work is typified by strong colours, with some critics noting her "jewelled intensity and consummate glass painting skills."

== Works ==
Apart from student pieces on secular themes, her artistic output was exclusively for churches, nearly all Roman Catholic. Common themes of her windows were the Catholic English Martyrs, the Annunciation and the lives of the Saints. In a shorter career than her cousin, only 30-odd years, she inevitably produced fewer windows - around 60. The most notable examples are listed below with locations and some illustrations. First are windows in the United Kingdom, followed by those in other countries, in alphabetical order of county or country. Inaccessible windows have been omitted. Asterisks indicate windows of particular importance.

== Exhibition ==
A major exhibition of Rope's work, under the title Heavenly Lights, opened at Shrewsbury Museum and Art Gallery in September 2016. In August 2019 the museum unveiled a new stained glass window created by local artist Nathalie Hildegarde Liege inspired by the exhibition.
