= George Howson =

George Howson may refer to:

- George Howson (British Army officer) (1886–1936), founder and chairman of the Royal British Legion Poppy Factory
- George Howson (headmaster) (1860–1919), English schoolmaster and writer
- George Howson (priest) (1854–1943), Anglican archdeacon
