= Haig Fund =

Charity to support British ex-servicemen

Cloth poppy with "Haig's Fund" button at centre.

The Haig Fund (more properly the Earl Haig Fund, also called Haig's Fund) is a charity set up in 1921 by Field Marshal Douglas Haig, 1st Earl Haig.

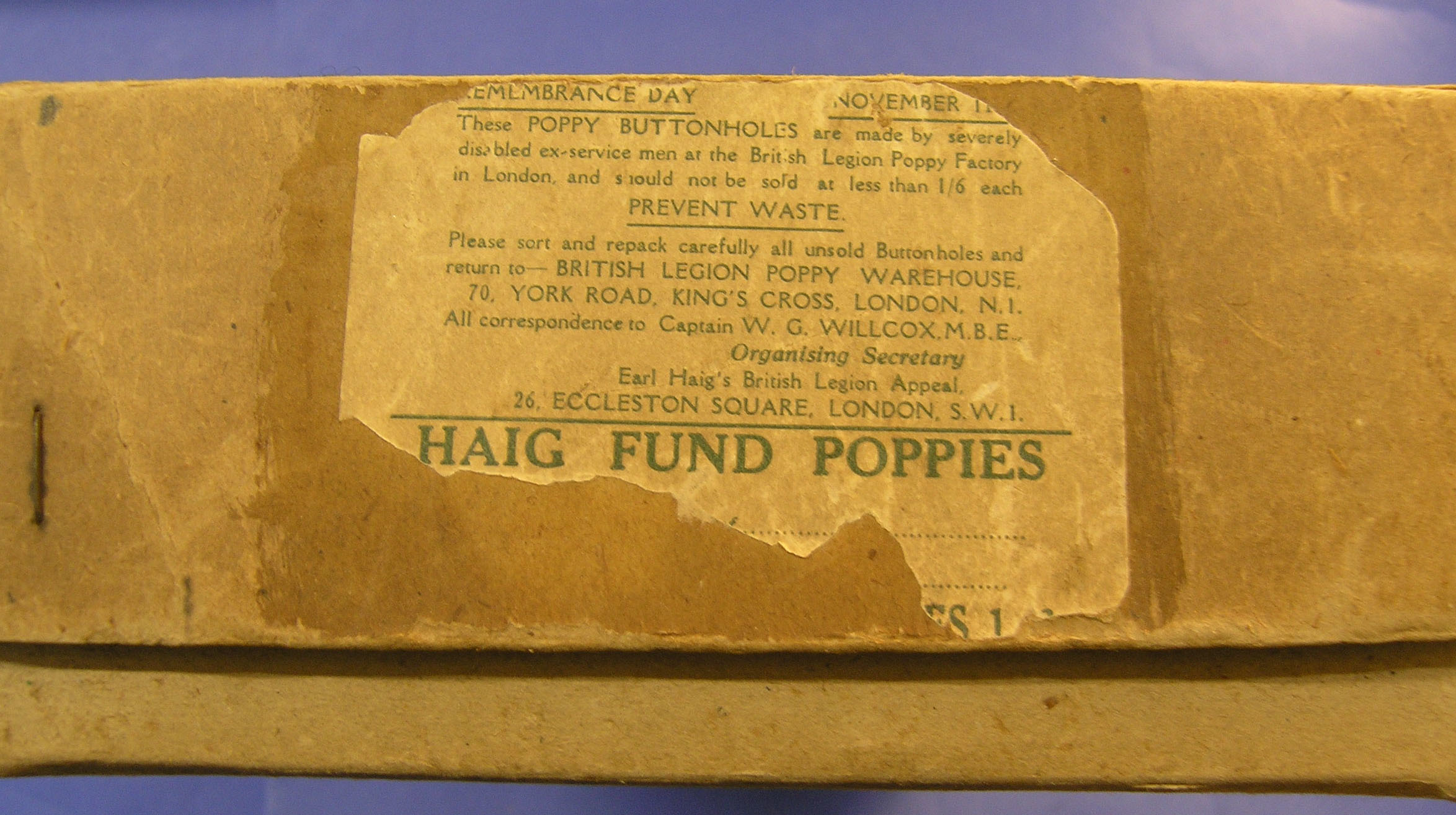
Label on a box of Haig Fund poppies: "These POPPY BUTTONHOLES are made by severely disabled ex-servicemen at the British Legion Poppy Factory in London and should not be sold at less than 1/6 each."

== History ==
In response to the poem In Flanders Field by John McCrae, Moina Michael started selling silk poppies in 1918 to raise funds for ex-servicemen. The "Disabled Society" was started in 1920 for disabled ex-servicemen and to raise funds for it Anna Guérin organised the production and sale of silk poppies. In 1921 Guérin persuaded Haig to adopt the poppy as the symbol of the Royal British Legion, however demand exceeded supply. In 1922 George Howson pledged that the disabled society could provide the poppies, which under the name of "The Poppy Factory" they continue to do.

On 1 January 1994 the words on the central black button were changed from "Haig Fund" to "Poppy Appeal".

The Haig Fund continues to support veterans from all conflicts and other military actions involving British Armed Forces up to the present day. Its members sell remembrance poppies in the weeks before Remembrance Day/Armistice Day.

== See also ==
- Australian Returned Soldiers and Sailors Imperial League or Returned & Services League of Australia
- Haig Homes
- Royal Canadian Legion
- Earl Haig Fund Scotland
