= Alfred Rimmer =

English artist and author

- Born: 9 August 1829; Liverpool, England
- Died: 27 October 1893 (aged 64); Chester, England
- Occupations: Artist and author

Alfred Rimmer (9 August 1829 – 27 October 1893) was an English artist and author.

== Biography ==
Rimmer was the son of Thomas Rimmer, timber merchant, and Mary Burroughs, his wife. He was born at Liverpool on 9 August 1829, and educated at Liverpool College under the Rev. J. S. Howson (afterwards dean of Chester). He was articled to a Liverpool architect named Cunningham, and followed the profession until 1858, when he went to Canada. There he engaged in trade and became consul-general for Denmark and justice of the peace in Montreal. He returned to England in 1870 and settled in Chester, devoting himself to artistic and literary pursuits. Before he went to Canada he published "Ancient Halls of Lancashire, from Original Drawings," Liverpool, 1852, 4to, and contributed two papers on ancient domestic architecture to the "Transactions of the Historic Society of Lancashire and Cheshire" (1800–1852). For the same journal he wrote in 1871 a paper on "Peculiarities of the Gothic Architecture of Chester and its Neighbourhood." In conjunction with Dean Howson he produced in 1872 a quarto volume on "Chester as it was,' and in 1875 illustrated the dean's work on the "River Dee: its Aspect and History." His other works, all illustrated by himself, were:

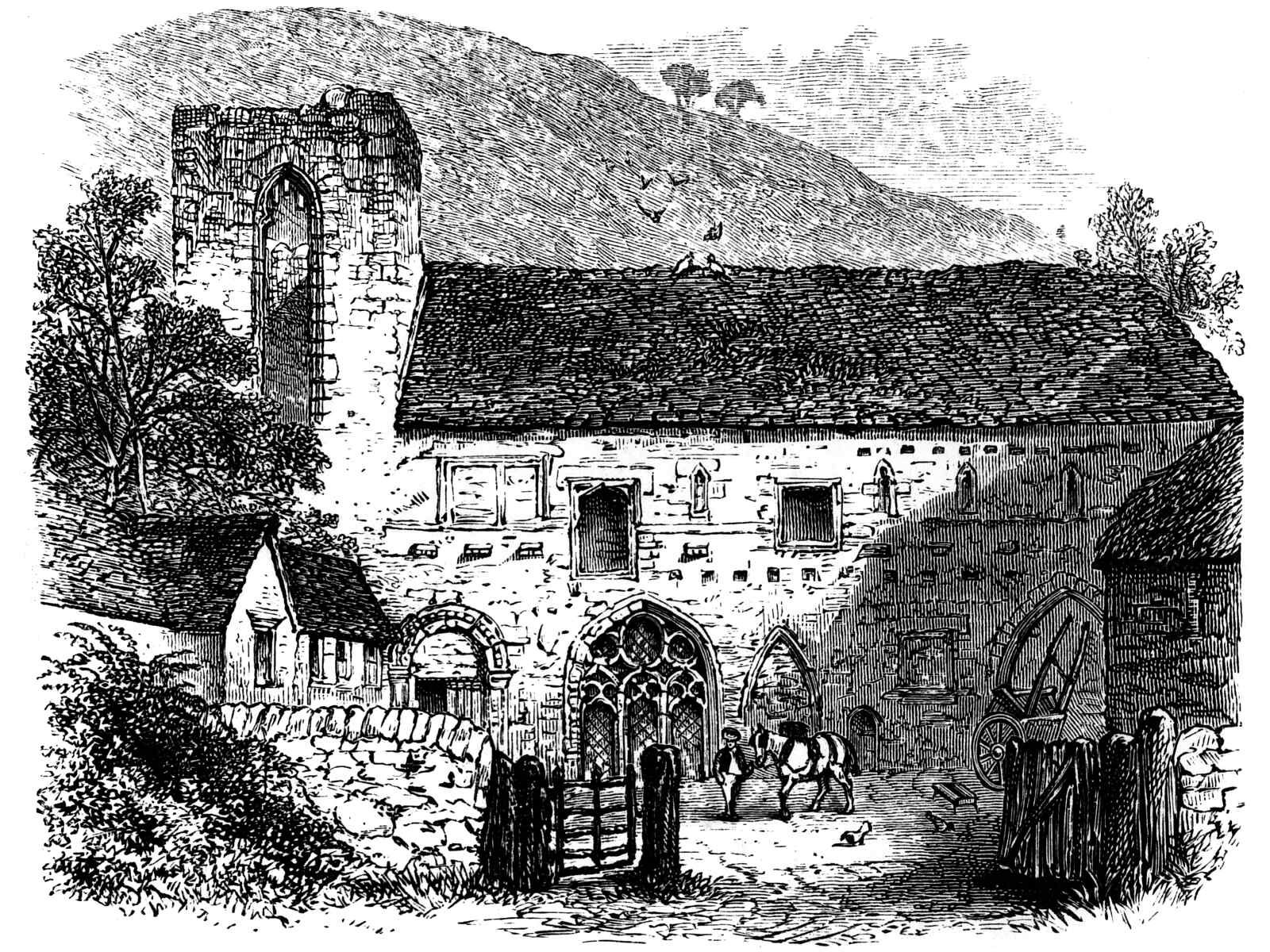
1875 drawing of Valle Crucis Abbey by Rimmer

- "Ancient Stone Crosses of England," 1875.
- "Ancient Streets and Homesteads of England," 1877.
- "Pleasant Spots around Oxford," 1878.
- "Our Old Country Towns," 1881.
- "Rambles about Eton and Harrow," 1882.
- "Early Homes of Prince Albert," 1882.
- "About England with Dickens," 1883.
- "Stonyhurst Illustrated," 1884.
- "Summer Rambles round Manchester" (reprinted from the Manchester Guardian), 1890.
- "Rambles round Rugby," 1892.

Rimmer received a grant of 100l. from the roval bounty fund in 1892. He died at Chester on 27 October 1893. He married Frances Parkinson of Liverpool, with whom he had five sons and two daughters. One of his sons, Heber Rimmer, a clever architect and draughtsman, born in 1869, died near Gibraltar on 2 June 1895.
