= Remembrance cross =

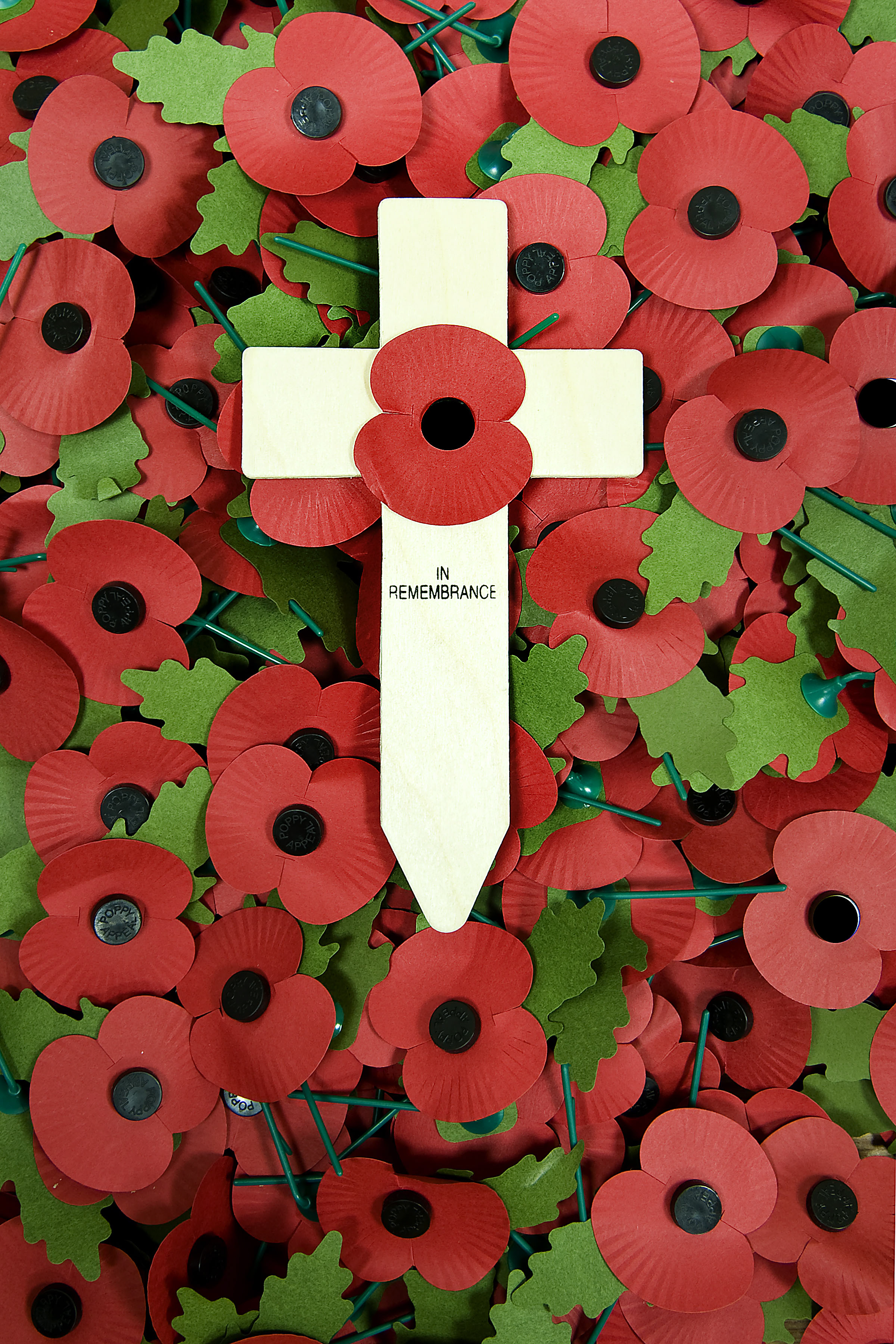
A remembrance cross lying on a bed of remembrance poppies at a service in Helmand, Afghanistan

A remembrance cross is a small wooden cross used to remember the sacrifice of the armed forces in the United Kingdom, particularly during Remembrancetide, the period of the annual Poppy Appeal. Remembrance crosses are produced by the Poppy Factory in Richmond and Lady Haig's Poppy Factory in Edinburgh, which also produce remembrance poppies and wreaths. A remembrance cross is usually decorated with a remembrance poppy and the phrase "Remembrance" or "In Remembrance",

The remembrance cross employs an explicitly Christian symbol, linking the loss of a deceased soldier with the sacrificial death of Jesus on the cross. Other tokens of remembrance are now also made in a variety of shapes for other religions, including a Star of David for the Jewish faith, a crescent for the Muslim faith, an Indian Khanda used for Hindus, Sikhs and Jains, and a plain shape for "no faith".

Remembrance crosses and other tokens of remembrance are often left at war memorials or war graves. Each year, in the eight days from the morning of the Thursday before Remembrance Sunday until the evening of following Thursday, plots in the Field of Remembrance in Westminster are planted with hundreds of remembrance crosses and other tokens of remembrance. After the Field of Remembrance closes, the tokens are collected and burnt, and the ashes are scattered at the First World War battlefields in northern France and Belgium.

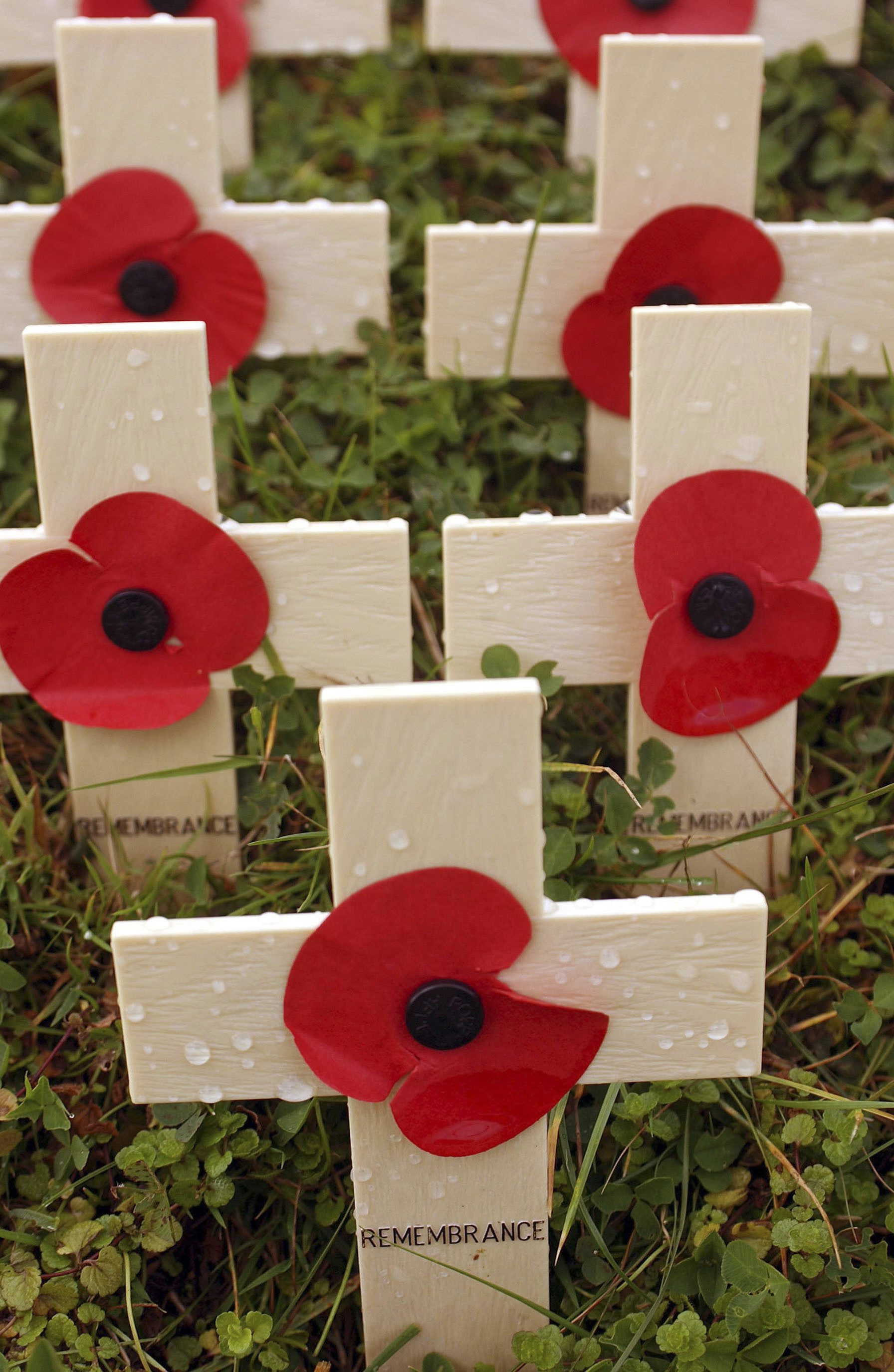
Remembrance crosses

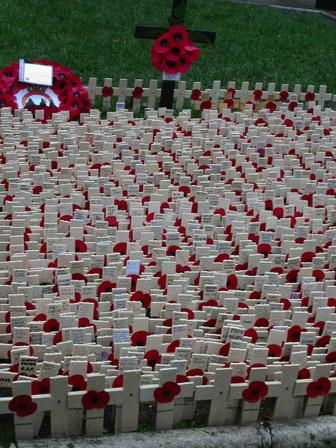
The Field of Remembrance outside Westminster Abbey

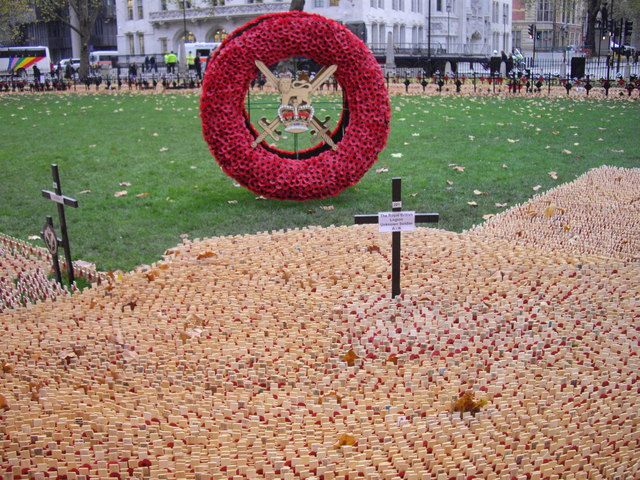
Massed tokens of remembrance and a large wreath at the Field of Remembrance
