= Coming Home campaign =

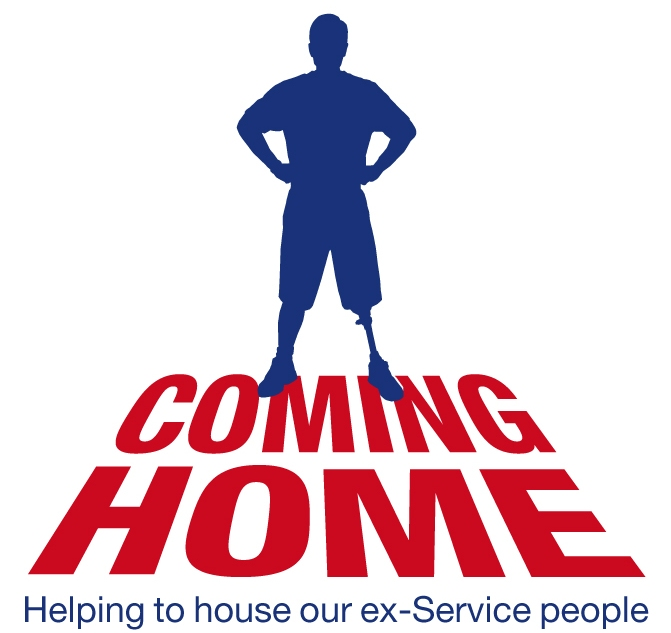

Coming Home is a campaign launched on 18 May 2011 to help the UK's Servicemen and women whose lives have been changed so dramatically fighting for their country in Afghanistan and Iraq.

Coming Home was established under the aegis of the charity Haig Housing Trust (http://www.haighousingtrust.org.uk/ a sister charity of Haig Homes) to provide specially adapted accommodation for badly injured soldiers who are left seriously disabled from the conflicts. The Coming Home campaign aims to raise £20 million over the next few years and complements the work of the charity Help for Heroes.

Coming Home was given the support of the UK Prime Minister David Cameron, Defence Secretary Liam Fox, former head of the British Army General the Lord Dannatt and the founder of Help for Heroes charity, Bryn Parry.

Since the beginning of the war in Afghanistan in 2001, 249 Servicemen have been very seriously injured and 260 seriously injured or wounded. There are a total of 168 amputees from Afghanistan – 14 are triple amputees, 66 double and the remainder have lost a single limb.

The Chief Executive of Coming Home and Haig Housing Trust is former Brigadier James Richardson.
