= John Howson (priest, born 1816) =

English cleric and antiquary (1816–85)

The Very Reverend John Saul Howson
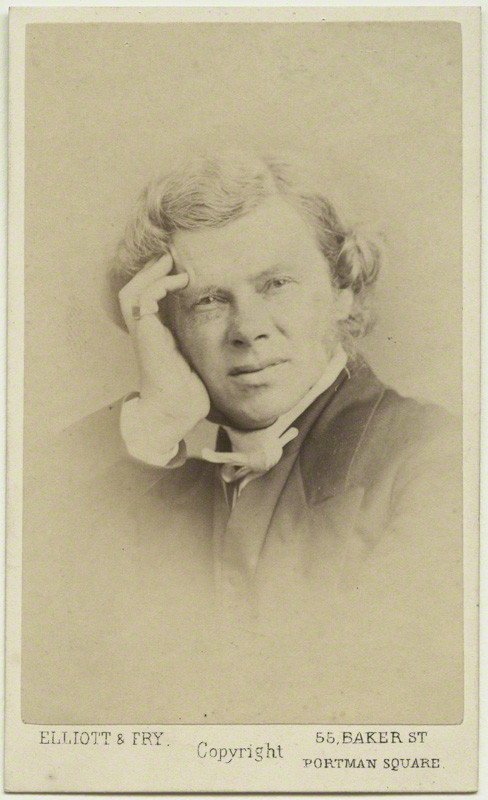
- Photograph of Howson by Elliott & Fry, 1860s
- Born: 5 May 1816; Giggleswick-on-Craven, Yorkshire, England
- Died: 15 December 1885 (aged 69); Bournemouth, Dorset, England
- Education: Trinity College; Cambridge
- Occupations: Anglican clergyman, educator
- Years active: 1845–1855
- Known for: Principal of Liverpool College; Dean of Chester; Divine
- Notable work: The Life and Epistles of St Paul (1852)
- Children: George Howson; James Howson

John Saul Howson (5 May 1816 – 15 December 1885) was a British divine and school master, who served as Dean of Chester Cathedral and Principal of Liverpool College.

== Early and private life ==
Howson was born at Giggleswick-on-Craven, Yorkshire. His father was head-master of Giggleswick School. His nephew George William Saul Howson (1860–1919) was a reforming headmaster of Gresham's School, Holt, Norfolk, between 1900 and his death.

After attending the school, he went to Trinity College, Cambridge. Graduating BA in 1837 and MA in 1840, he became private tutor at Cambridge to the Marquess of Sligo and the Marquess of Lorne.

== Career ==
Letter (1856)

In 1845 Howson, having taken orders, accepted the post of senior classical master at the Liverpool College under his friend W. J. Conybeare, whom he succeeded as principal in 1849. This post he held until 1865, and it was largely due to his influence that a similar college for girls was established at Liverpool.

On 2 June 1865, Howson was appointed as Honorary Chaplain of the 1st Lancashire Rifle Volunteer Corps.

In 1866 he left Liverpool to become vicar of the Parish Church of St Peter and St Paul, Wisbech, and in 1867 he was appointed dean of Chester Cathedral, where he gave himself vigorously to the work of restoring the crumbling fabric, collecting nearly £100,000 in five years for this purpose His restoration created a great debate and led in part to formation of the Society for the Protection of Ancient Buildings.

His sympathies were with the evangelical party, and he stoutly opposed the "Eastward position," but he was by no means narrow. He did much to reintroduce the ministry of women as deaconesses. The building of the King's School for boys, and the Queen's School for girls (both in Chester), was due in a great measure to the active interest which he took in educational matters.

Howson's chief literary production was The Life and Epistles of St Paul (1852) in which he collaborated with Conybeare.

== Family ==
He married the daughter of John Cropper, who survived him by only a few days. He died at Bournemouth on 15 December 1885 and was buried in the cloister garth of Chester.

Howson was the father of George Howson (1854–1943) who was Archdeacon of Warrington from 1916 to 1933, and then Archdeacon of Liverpool from 1933 to 1934; another son James Howson (1856–1934) was Archdeacon of Craven from 1928 to 1934. His grandson George Howson was the founder and chairman of the Royal British Legion Poppy Factory.

Professional and academic associations
Preceded by Abraham Hume	President of the Historic Society of Lancashire and Cheshire; 1875–79	Succeeded by Thomas Glazebrook Rylands
