= War Widows' Guild of Australia NSW =

The War Widows' Guild of Australia NSW Ltd is a not for profit membership-based organization whose mission is to promote and protect the interests of war widows in New South Wales. Established by women and for women in June 1946 the Guild has fought over the years to improve the financial and social circumstances of members.

After years operating as an incorporated association, the New South Wales Guild became a public company limited by guarantee in 1998. It is a public benevolent institution with deductible gift recipient status.

== History ==
Jessie Vasey established the War Widows' Guild of Australia in Victoria in 1945 to bring war widows together to support each other and to speak with one voice to improve their circumstances. Within two years the organisation had spread across Australia, with the Guild being established in New South Wales in 1946. Guild clubs were established to support war widows across Sydney and New South Wales. Secretaries, including Una Boyce, who was State Secretary of the Guild from 1961 to 1989, succeeded in achieving a range of concessions and benefits for war widows. Since its inception, the Guild has continued to advocate on behalf of war widows and offers friendship and services to its members.

== Motto ==
The Guild's motto is an extract from King George VI's Christmas message of 1941 and was adopted by the national Guild in 1949 at its third annual conference. The extract was considered a suitable expression of their ideals:

"We all belong to each other. We all need each other. It is in serving each other and in sacrificing for our common good that we are finding our true life."

== War Widows' Badge and Logo ==
The Guild's founder, Jessie Vasey, was the originator of the idea for the design of the Guild's badge. It features the kookaburra, an industrious and cheerful bird who mates for life and is fearless and aggressive in the defence of its young and the area of territory it regards as its own. The bird also has a unique call, not a song but a laugh; a chortle of rollicking mirth (to bring the widows back to laughter). Also the kookaburra is a typically and completely Australian symbol, one that could be worn proudly by every widow whatever her creed or ideals. The kookaburra was also the mascot of the 7th Division, commanded by Vasey's husband, Major-General George Alan Vasey.

Vasey asked the Hungarian sculptor, Andor Mészáros, who was living in Melbourne, to design a badge featuring this Australian bird. The badge was made of sterling silver in England, and depicted a kookaburra alighting onto a branch of gum leaves. Sometime later, as membership increased, smaller badges were made out of base metal as the price of sterling silver had become prohibitive. The Guild has adopted the kookaburra badge design as its logo.

== Milestone ==
To mark the Guild's 60th Anniversary in 2006, the New South Wales Guild commissioned their own history. No Peacetime Cinderellas, written by historian Roslyn Burge, tells the story of the Guild since its establishment in New South Wales. The book was launched in October 2008 by the Guild's Patron, Her Excellency Marie Bashir, Governor of New South Wales.

== Membership ==
Membership in New South Wales is open to women defined as war widows in the Veterans' Entitlements Act 1986 who have not remarried, to widows and dependants covered by subsequent legislation, and also to eligible war widows from allied countries. In 2011 there were about 9,500 members around NSW.

== Services ==
The Guild advocates for war widows to the Commonwealth, NSW and local governments and to other organizations. The New South Wales Guild built 13 blocks of self-care units at nine locations between 1953 and 1988, and continues to provide low cost self care housing to war widows. The Guild also provides information, advice and help to its members. The Guild has over 100 Guild and Social Clubs based in Sydney and in regional New South Wales.

== Magazine ==
Communications with members are important for the Guild and in 1948 it commenced publishing the News Sheet. In 1957 the name of the magazine, published quarterly, was changed to Guild Digest. The publication is registered as a serial title with the National Library of Australia.

== Major events ==
Four major events are held each year: the ANZAC Field of Remembrance, the Annual General Meeting, the War Widows' Walk and Picnic, and the members' Christmas Party.

== War Widows' Guilds in Australia ==
The War Widows' Guild of Australia NSW Ltd is part of an Australia-wide network of state based Guilds in Queensland, Victoria, Tasmania, South Australia, Western Australia and the Australian Capital Territory. Each State Guild is a member of the national organisation, War Widows' Guild of Australia Inc.
