= George Howson (British Army officer) =

Major George Arthur Howson MC (7 September 1886 – 28 November 1936) was an officer in the British Army in the First World War, and later the founder and chairman of the Royal British Legion Poppy Factory.

== Early life ==
Howson was the youngest child of George Howson, rector of Overton-on-Dee (then in Flintshire). He was the descendant of Anglican clergymen through both parents: his paternal grandfather (John Howson) was Dean of Chester, and his maternal great-grandfather (Thomas Dealtry) was Bishop of Madras. He was christened with a second forename, Arthur, but he disliked it, and never used it. His sister, Joan Howson, became a stained glass artist.

Howson was educated at Loretto School, Musselburgh, and studied at Heriot-Watt College in Edinburgh. After university, through his father's connections, he was found a position as assistant manager at Melalap Estate, a rubber estate in British North Borneo from 1909 to 1914, where he contracted malaria, dysentery, and jaundice.

== War service ==
Howson was on sick leave in England in 1914 when the First World War broke out. He was commissioned as a second lieutenant in the 11th (Service) Battalion of the Hampshire Regiment in September 1914. He served on the Western Front throughout the war, from 1914 to 1918. Having been promoted to captain, he was awarded the Military Cross for his actions at Pilckem Ridge in the Battle of Passchendaele on 31 July 1917, where, despite receiving a shrapnel wound, he encouraged his unit to continue repairing a road under shellfire. He was promoted to major, and finally retired from the army in May 1920.

== Post-war career ==
Howson married Jessie Gibson in September 1918. She was the daughter of William Gibson, the Australian owner of the Foy & Gibson department stores. The newly married couple quickly became wealthy after William Gibson died in November 1918. His eldest child, and only son, Peter Howson later became a government minister in Australia.

Howson was the founding chairman of the Disabled Society in 1920, with Jack Cohen MP. After the first Poppy Appeal in 1921 used artificial poppies imported from France by Madame Anna Guérin, the British Legion commissioned the Disabled Society to make poppies in England for the 1922 appeal. Howson started with a workforce of five disabled ex-servicemen at a former collar factory on the Old Kent Road in June 1922. The number of employees rapidly increased to over 40, and they made a million poppies within two months. The Prince of Wales (later Edward VIII) visited the Poppy Factory in November 1924. The factory made 27 million poppies that year. Most of the employees were disabled, and by then there was a long waiting list for prospective employees.

The Disabled Society merged with the British Legion in 1925, and the Poppy Factory became a company limited by guarantee, with Howson as chairman. The factory moved to Richmond, Surrey in 1926, to the premises of an old brewery bought using money donated by Howson. Howson instituted the Field of Remembrance at Westminster Abbey in 1928, and the factory started to make remembrance crosses and wreaths.

Howson lived at Hambleden, near Henley-on-Thames, with a town house in Kensington. He died of cancer of the pancreas. He was buried at Hambleden, with the funeral service conducted by his father, by then an archdeacon and canon emeritus of Liverpool Cathedral. He was survived by his wife and their four children.
