= George Howson (priest) =

British clergyman (1854-1943)

George John Howson (1 May 1854 – 20 May 1943) was an Anglican archdeacon.

Howson was born in Liverpool in 1854 where his father, John Howson, was Principal of the Liverpool Collegiate Institution (Liverpool College). He was educated at that college and Haileybury College and went to Trinity College, Cambridge in 1873, achieving a BA degree and an MA in 1880. He was ordained in 1878. After a curacy at Maidstone, during which time he married Ethel Dealtry, daughter of the vicar of Maidstone, he held incumbencies in Overton-on-Dee; Christ Church, Crewe (from 1888); Christ Church, Salford (from 1901); Crumpsall; Southport and Woolton. He was Archdeacon of Warrington from 1916 to 1933, and then of Liverpool from 1933 until his retirement in 1934.

His son, also George (1886–1936), was the founder and chairman of the Royal British Legion Poppy Factory. His daughter Joan (1885–1964) was a stained glass artist of the Arts and Crafts movement; together with Caroline Townshend she founded the Townshend and Howson company.

George and Ethel lived at 79 Deodar Road, Putney, next to their daughter Joan. Ethel died in 1937, and George on 20 May 1943.

His younger brother James Francis (Frank) Howson (1856–1934) was Archdeacon of Craven from 1928 to 1934.
