= ANZAC Field of Remembrance =

The ANZAC Field of Remembrance is an annual event held at St. Andrew's Cathedral, Sydney, which is hosted by the War Widows' Guild of Australia NSW Ltd. The event involves the planting of wooden crosses in remembrance of those who have died due to their involvement in war.

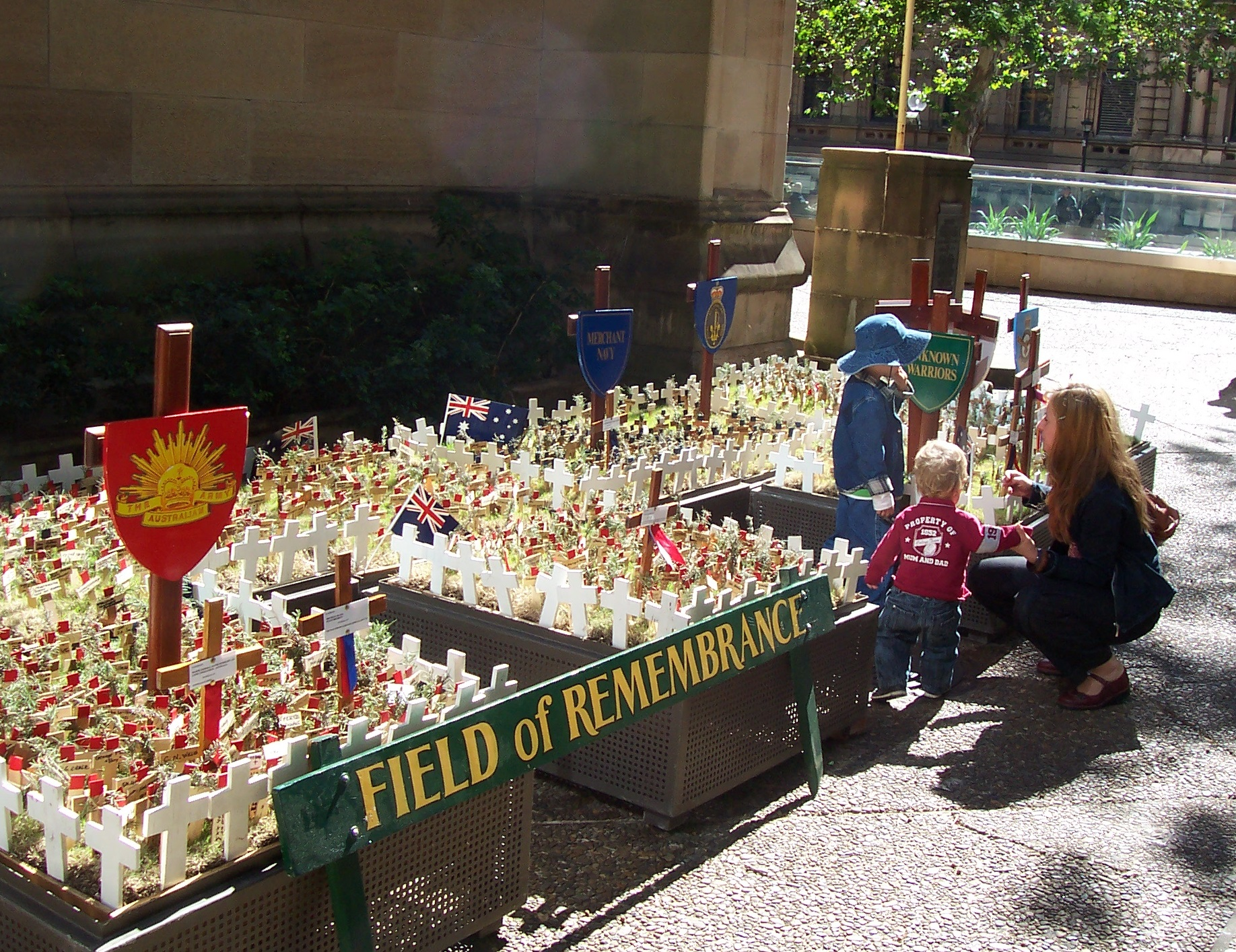
A young family look at the crosses planted in the ANZAC Field of Remembrance, Sydney, April 2009

== History ==
The first Field of Remembrance in Sydney was held in 1952. It was an idea that originated from the late Mrs C J Pope, widow of Rear Admiral Pope, after she had visited London and been impressed by the Field of Remembrance held each year in an old churchyard near Westminster Abbey. In 1972 the Attorney-General granted the War Widows’ Guild of Australia NSW Ltd permission to use the word 'ANZAC' in the title, and the Field has been known since then as the ANZAC Field of Remembrance and continues to the present day.

== The Ceremony ==
A non-denominational service is held prior to Anzac Day at St Andrew's Cathedral, Sydney, with a lesson read by the Governor of New South Wales. The service is followed by the Dedication of the Field and the planting of the official crosses. The first cross is planted by the Governor in memory of The Unknown Warrior, followed by crosses planted on behalf of the three armed forces: Navy, Army and Air Force; the citizens of Sydney; New Zealanders and their armed forces; veterans; and war widows. The Field was originally laid out on the lawn adjoining the Cathedral near Bathurst Street. Since 2016 the Field has been in Hyde Park on the Corner of Park Street and Elizabeth Street close to the ANZAC Memorial. The crosses are planted in a set of flower boxes that are periodically used to decorate the City of Sydney.

== The Crosses ==
The small wooden crosses are colour-coded to represent the different armed forces. A sprig of rosemary is attached to each cross which represents a loved one gone but remembered. They are each personalised with hand written names or small messages. After the Field of Remembrance is closed, the crosses are cremated and scattered on the graves of veterans in a memorial garden.

== Duration ==
The Field of Remembrance is open for widows and members of the public to place crosses in personal remembrance, from the day of the commemoration service until the late afternoon on Anzac Day.

== Milestone ==
The Guild held its 60th ANZAC Field of Remembrance on 19 April 2011. At this service, war widows from major and recent conflicts laid sprays of flowers on the Chancel steps of the cathedral. The Governor of New South Wales, Her Excellency Professor Marie Bashir AC CVO unveiled a plaque to recognise this milestone of 60 years.

== Other Fields of Remembrance ==
Following the establishment of the Sydney Field of Remembrance, the War Widows’ Guild has also held Fields of Remembrance in Albury, Newcastle, The Entrance and Tamworth. The War Widows’ Guild in the Australian Capital Territory and Tasmania also hold Fields of Remembrance.
