= Field of Remembrance =

English memorial garden

Coordinates: 51.4999°N 0.1276°W

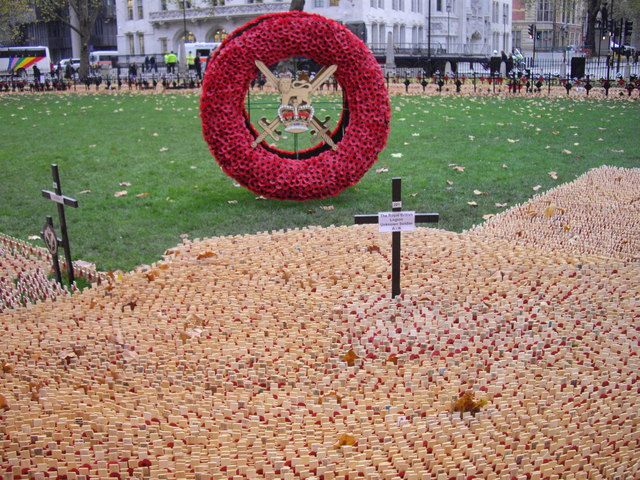
Tightly-packed memorials outside Westminster Abbey for Remembrance Day, 2009

The Field of Remembrance is a memorial garden organised annually by the Poppy Factory in Westminster, London.

For eight days, from the morning of the Thursday before Remembrance Sunday until the evening of following Thursday, the lawn of St Margaret's Church, Westminster, between Westminster Abbey and the Houses of Parliament, is marked out with 250 plots for regimental and armed services associations. Participants are able to buy a wooden token of remembrance (originally remembrance crosses, now a variety of shapes for different religions, including for 'no faith') decorated with a remembrance poppy. The token is generally marked with the name of a member of the armed forces who was killed in action and planted in the appropriate plot. The packed lines of remembrance symbols in the separate plots can resemble a temporary military cemetery. After the Field of Remembrance closes, the crosses are collected and burnt, and the ashes are scattered at the First World War battlefields in northern France and Belgium. Any money raised at the event is traditionally donated by the Poppy Factory to the Royal British Legion.

The Field of Remembrance was first held in 1928, organised by George Arthur Howson, an officer in the British Army in the First World War and founder and chairman of the Poppy Factory. In the first year, there were only two memorials: one dedicated to "Tommy Atkins" (a nickname for a rank-and-file soldier in the British Army); and one to Field Marshal Douglas Haig, 1st Earl Haig, founder of the Royal British Legion, who had died in January 1928.

The ANZAC Field of Remembrance at St Andrew's Cathedral, Sydney, Australia was established in 1952, inspired by the Field of Remembrance in London.

For the 90th anniversary of the Poppy Appeal in 2011, other Fields of Remembrance were established at Belfast, Cardiff, and Edinburgh. A Field of Remembrance was also created at Lydiard Park in November 2011, close to Royal Wootton Bassett, in the shape 11-11-11-11, commemorating the 93rd anniversary of the Armistice with Germany at 11 am on 11 November 1918.

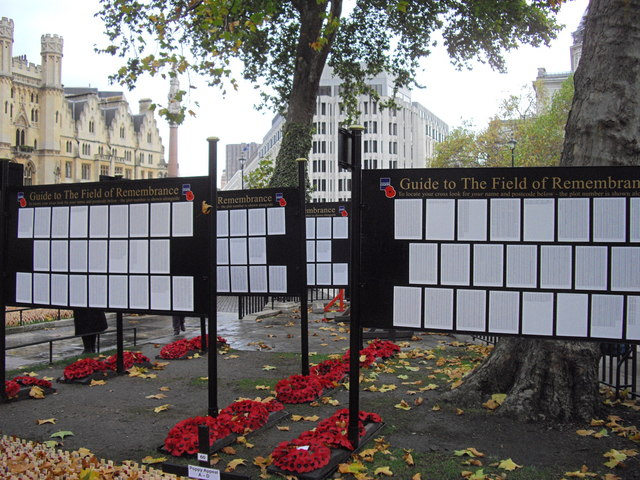
Noticeboards with guides to the plots on the Field of Remembrance at Westminster

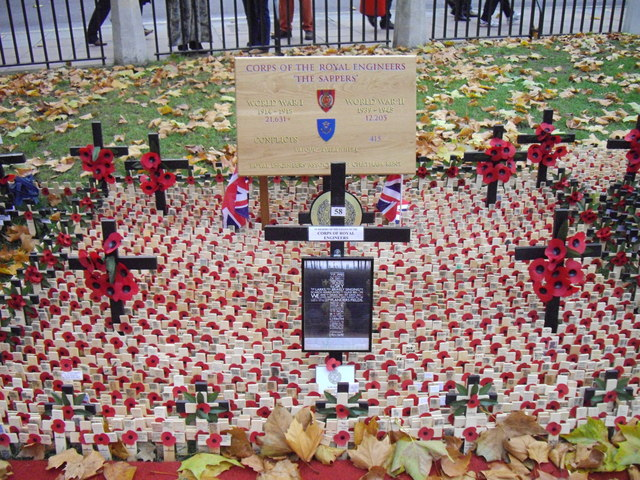
An example plot, commemorating soldiers of the Royal Engineers

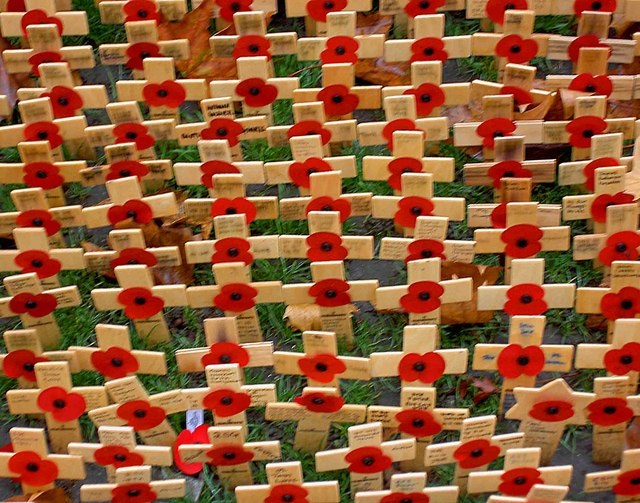
Ranks of remembrance crosses at the Field of Remembrance

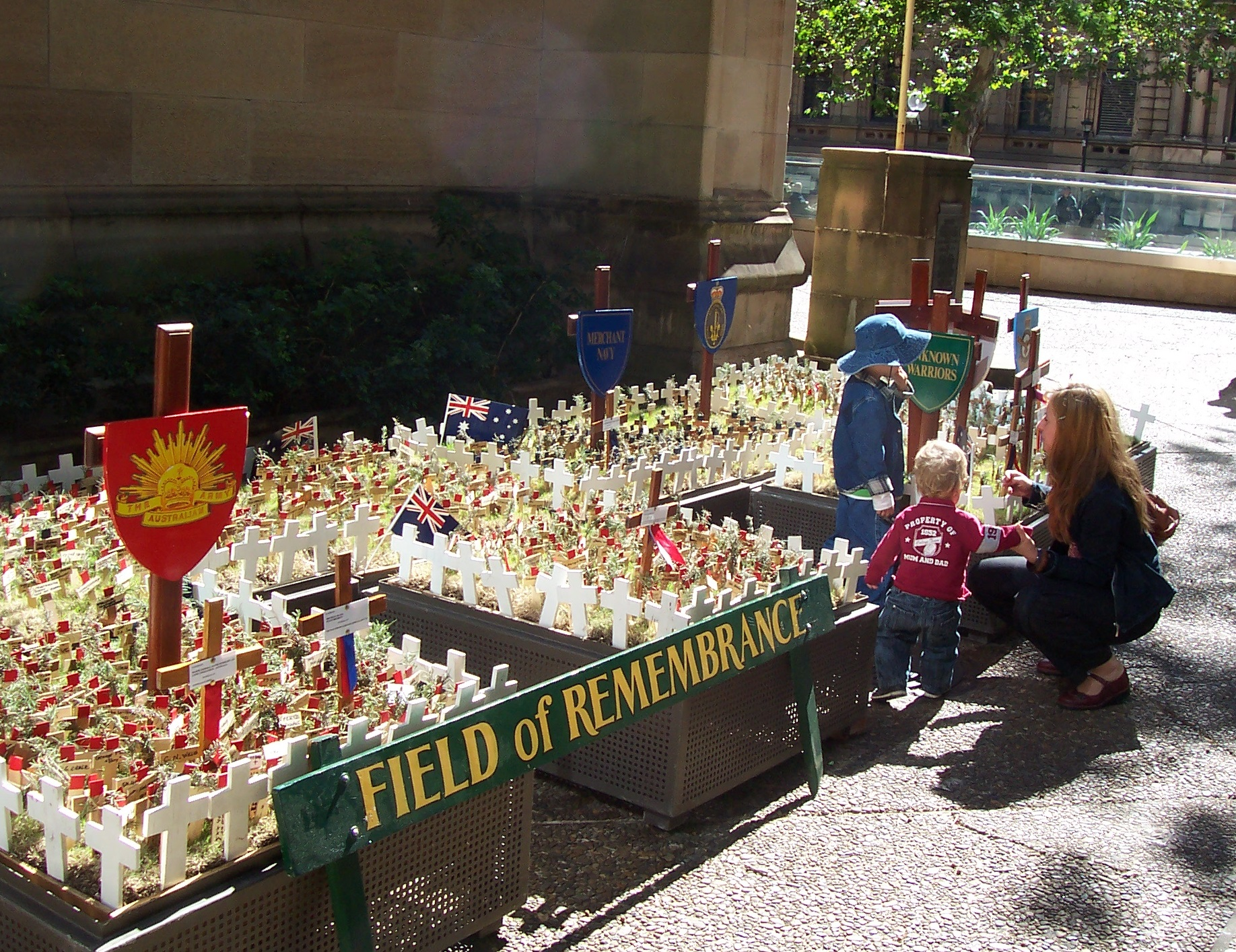
A young family look at the crosses planted in the ANZAC Field of Remembrance in Sydney, Australia

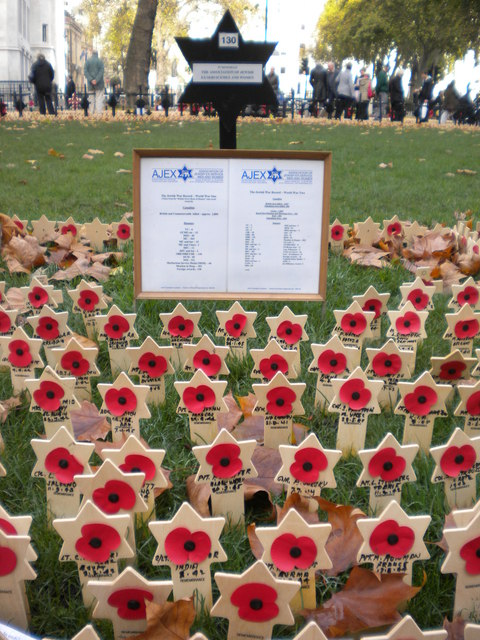
Tokens of remembrance in the plot for the Association of Jewish Ex-Servicemen and Women (AJEX), at the Field of Remembrance at Westminster
