= Earl Haig Fund Scotland =

Scottish charity

- Formation: 1921
- Founder: Douglas Haig, 1st Earl Haig
- Legal status: Charity
- Headquarters: New Haig House, Logie Green Road, Edinburgh EH7 4HQ
- Subsidiaries: Lady Haig's Poppy Factory
- Website: www.poppyscotland.org.uk

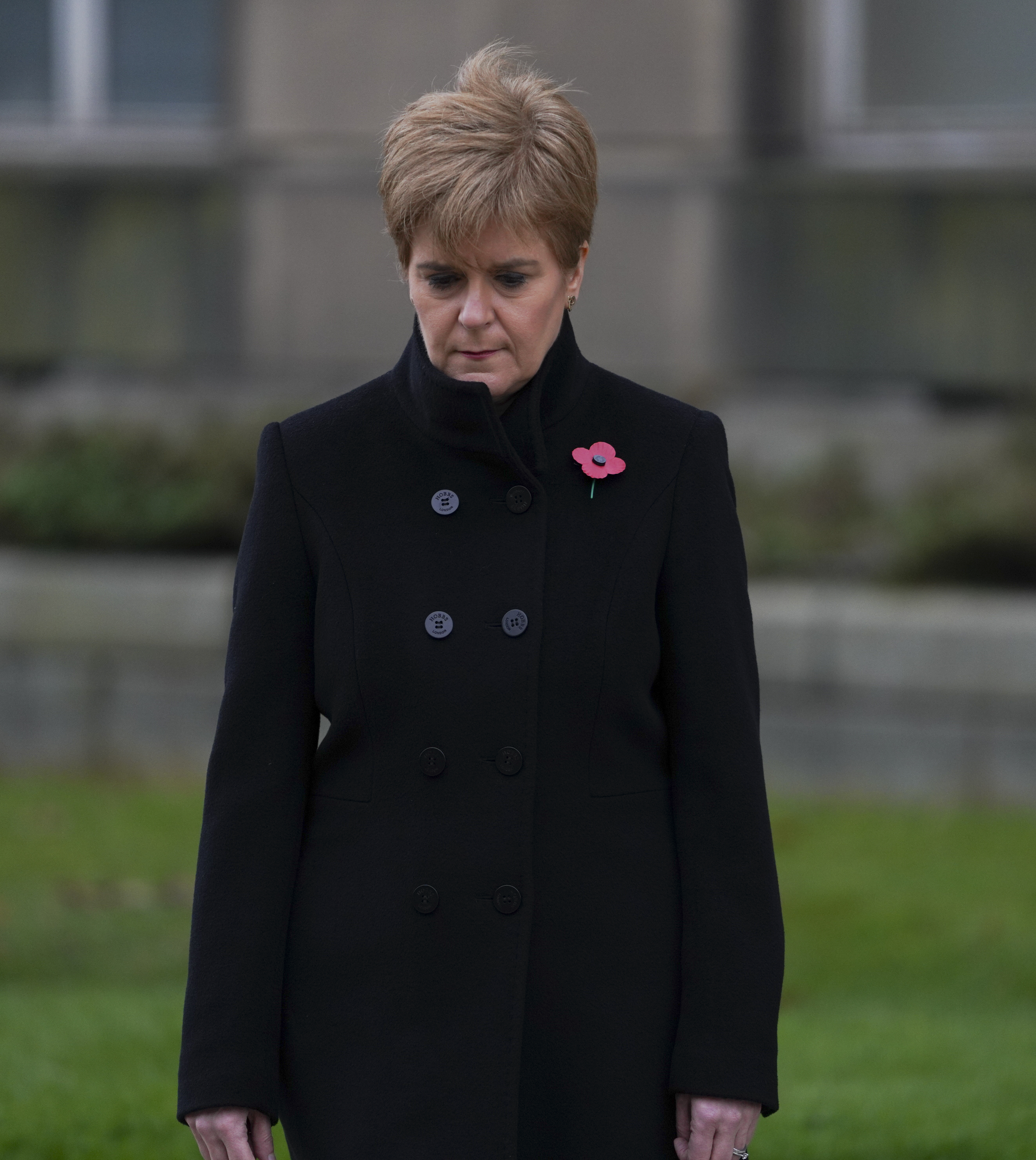
Nicola Sturgeon wearing a remembrance poppy distributed by the Earl Haig Fund Scotland, 2021. Note the lack of a leaf, a feature found on Royal British Legion remembrance poppies, but absent on Scottish poppies.

The Earl Haig Fund Scotland, trading as poppyscotland, is a Scottish charity for veterans of the British Armed Forces and their dependants. It was founded in 1921 by Douglas Haig, 1st Earl Haig as part of the broader British Haig Fund. Its main source of funding is the Scottish Poppy Appeal, organised in conjunction with the Royal British Legion in Scotland, which sells remembrance poppies in early November leading up to Remembrance Sunday. The first Poppy Appeal took place in 1921, and in 1926 Countess Haig established the Lady Haig's Poppy Factory in Edinburgh. The fund merged with The Royal British Legion in 2011 but operates as a distinct charity with the Legion.

Funds raised by the Scottish Poppy Appeal are directed to:

- Providing direct financial assistance to ex-Service men, women and their dependents in Scotland.
- Funding an advice service, including pension claims and appeals.
- Supported employment for veterans with disabilities.
- Grants and research for ex-Service organisations that deliver specialist services to veterans in Scotland.

They also sell a wide variety of products beside poppies such as clothing and soft toys.
