= James Howson =

British clergyman (1856–1934)

The Venerable James Francis Howson MA

Archdeacon of Craven
- In office 1928–1934

Personal details
- Born: 1856
- Died: 19 February 1934 (aged 77–78)
- Parent: John Howson (father)
- Relatives: George Howson (brother)
- Education: Haileybury College
- Alma mater: Trinity College, Cambridge

The Venerable James Francis Howson (1856–1934) was Archdeacon of Craven from 1928 to 1934.

Howson was born into an ecclesiastical family. His father John Howson was Dean of Chester from 1867 to 1885. His older brother George Howson (1854–1943) was Archdeacon of Warrington from 1916 to 1933, and then Archdeacon of Liverpool from 1933 to 1934

He was educated at Haileybury and Trinity College, Cambridge and ordained in 1879. After curacies at Beverley, Halesowen and Lambeth he was Vicar of New Brighton, Chester and Guiseley (during which time he was also a temporary Chaplain to the Forces) before his years as an Archdeacon. He died on 19 February 1934.
