= Haig Housing =

- Named after: Douglas Haig, 1st Earl Haig
- Formation: 1916 (as The Housing Association for Officers' Families) 1928 (as The Douglas Haig Memorial Homes) 1995 (Merged to become Haig Homes) 2013 (as Haig Housing Trust)
- Merger of: The Housing Association for Officers' Families, The Douglas Haig Memorial Homes
- Headquarters: Victoria, London, UK
- Region served: United Kingdom
- Services: Houses for the British Armed Forces veteran community
- Chief Executive: Tim Stockings
- Website: https://www.haighousing.org.uk/

Haig Housing is a charity established to provide affordable housing for veterans in the United Kingdom and the Channel Islands.

== History ==
Haig Housing was founded by Mrs Willie James as The Housing Association for Officers' Families (HAOF) in 1916. In 1995, it merged with Douglas Haig Memorial Homes, a charitable trust established as a memorial to Field Marshal Earl Haig in 1929.

It now operates over 1,500 properties across the UK. Queen Elizabeth II visited one of the charity's developments, involving 68 homes in Morden, in October 2019.

== See also ==
- Haig Fund
- Coming Home campaign
