= Richmond Brewery Stores =

Building in Richmond, London, England

Coordinates: 51.4559°N 0.3034°W

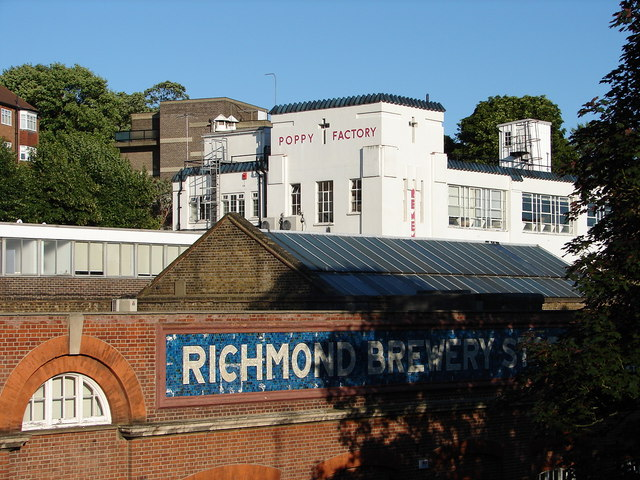
The Poppy Factory in Richmond, with Richmond Brewery Stores in the foreground

Richmond Brewery Stores is a building on 18 Petersham Road in Richmond, London, England. Built in red brick, it has a tiled facade with "RICHMOND BREWERY STORES" in white lettering on blue. Further to the south along Petersham Road was the brewery itself.

== History ==
Known as Lansdown Brewery, and operated by D Watney & Son, it was registered in April 1895. It is known to have been in existence at least as early as 1882 when the brewery design practice Davison, Inskipp & Mackenzie was engaged to extend the building.

In 1915, it was acquired by Brandon's Putney Brewery Ltd and closed. In 1923, the National Fire Protection Company Limited occupied the former Brewery Stores building.

In 1950, the toy manufacturer Rovex Plastics Limited, which made plastic toys for Marks and Spencer, bought the building for use as a factory. The company's nameplate was placed over "RICHMOND BREWERY STORES" during the firm's use of the building. By 1954, it was becoming obvious that the factory was quite inadequate to produce the volume of goods and, following the acquisition by Tri-ang, the factory moved to Margate in Kent in 1954.

The Richmond and Twickenham Times reported in November 2014 that the building, now owned by a property developer, will be converted into offices and flats.

== See also ==
- Poppy Factory
