= Anna Guérin =

Originator of Remembrance Poppy Day

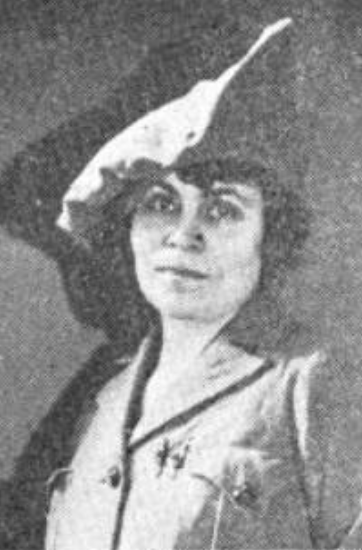
- Madame E. Guérin, from a 1919 publication
- Born: Anna Alix Boulle; February 3, 1878; Vallon-Pont-d'Arc, France
- Died: April 16, 1961 (aged 83); 5 Charles Dickens Square, Paris
- Occupations: Teacher, Lecturer, WW1 War Lecturer, Humanitarian, Originator of the 'Inter-Allied Poppy Day' idea - adopted by all English-speaking First World War allied nations.
- Known for: Remembrance poppy
- Awards: Ordre des Palmes académiques Officier de l'Instruction Publique; U.S. Victory Liberty Loan Medal

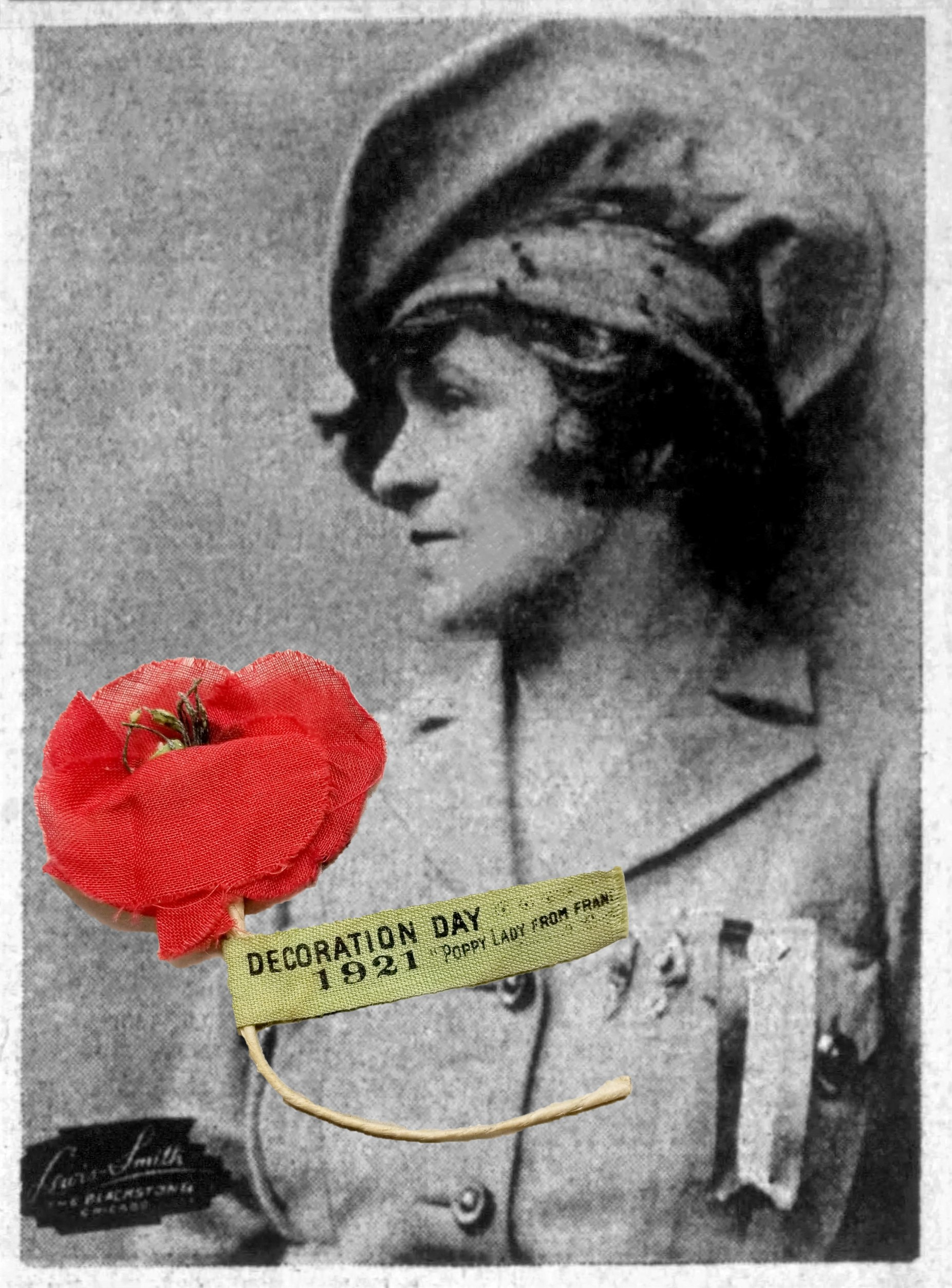
Anna Guérin in her "campaign uniform" - this was based on the French Chasseurs Alpins' uniform. This particular image was printed in the Salt Lake Tribune on 3 April 1920. It is edited with an overlay of a 1921 French-made remembrance poppy - one that was distributed in Canada.

Anna Guérin (born Anna Alix Boulle, 3 February 1878 – 16 April 1961) was the originator of the Remembrance Poppy Day - she was 'The Poppy Lady from France'. Prior to this, she was a teacher in Madagascar; a lecturer for the Alliance Française; and a lecturer, fundraiser and humanitarian in the United States, during World War I. For services to France, she was awarded the Ordre des Palmes académiques. and the Officier de l'Instruction Publique. For her services to the United States, for the Liberty Bond, Anna Guérin was awarded the Victory Liberty Loan Medallion.

Initially, her Poppy Days benefited the widows and orphans of the war devastated regions of France. She was christened “The Poppy Lady from France” after being invited to address the American Legion, at its 1920 convention, in Cleveland, Ohio, about her original ‘Inter-Allied Poppy Day’ idea. Her idea was for all World War I Allied countries to use artificial poppies, made by French widows and orphans, as an emblem for remembering those who gave their lives during the World War I and, at the same time, creating a method of raising funds to support the families of the fallen and those who had survived, thereafter. Now, the Remembrance Poppy encompasses all conflicts that have occurred since.

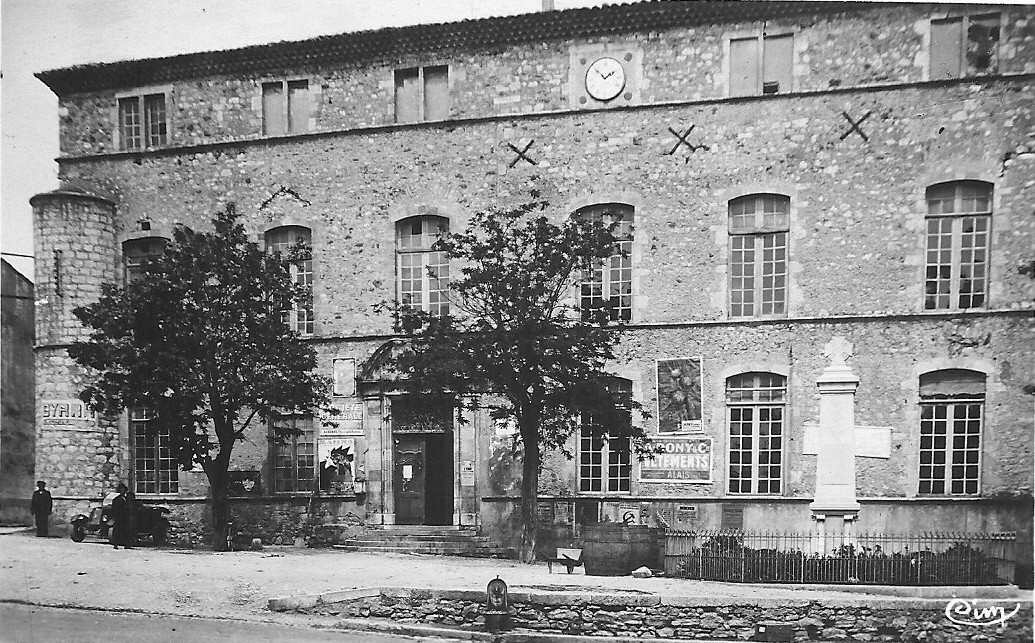
La Mairie (Town Hall), Vallon, Ardèche département, France.

== Early life ==
Guérin was born Anna Alix Boulle on 3 February 1878 at was born at Vallon (-Pont-d’Arc), Ardèche, France. Her parents were farm-owner Auguste Boulle and his wife Anna (née Granier). She married Cuban-born French national Paul Rabanit in Vallon, on 6 November 1897. Soon after the wedding, they travelled to the French colony of Madagascar.

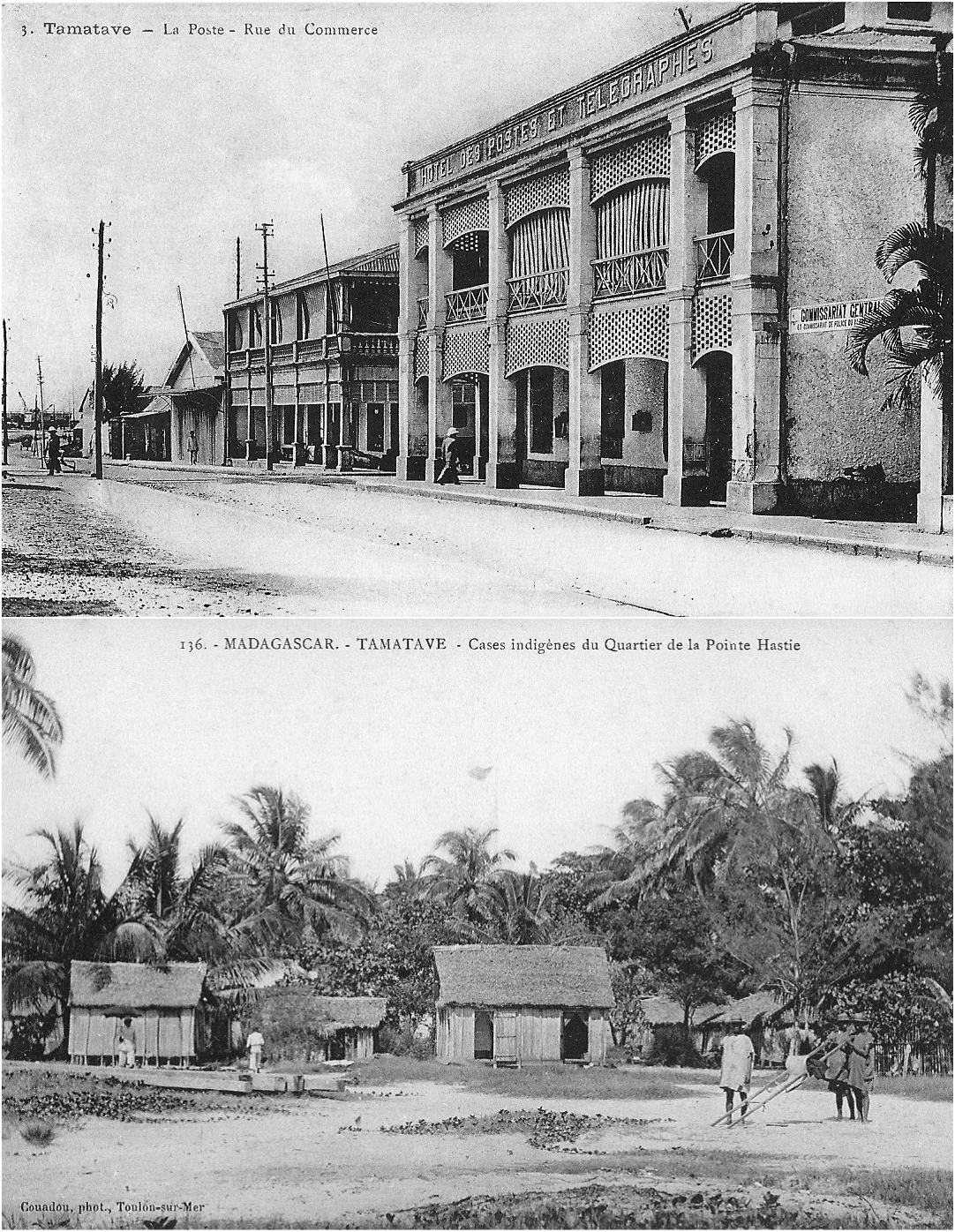
Two sides to Madagascar, during Madame E. Guérin's time - French and Malagasy.

== Madagascar ==
After arriving on the island of Madagascar, Anna (as Madame Rabanit) began teaching. She created a boarding school ‘École Rabanit’, which gained a reputation as one of the best on the island. She was one of the people on the island who helped Gouverneur Général Joseph-Simon Gallieni in his quest to educate the Malagasy people in the French language and culture. For these services, Anna was awarded the French médaille ‘Officier d'Académie’ (Silver Palms) in 1907. She divorced her husband the same year. In 1909, she left Madagascar. On 17 October 1910, Anna married Judge Constant Charles Eugène Guérin (“Eugène”) in Vallon.

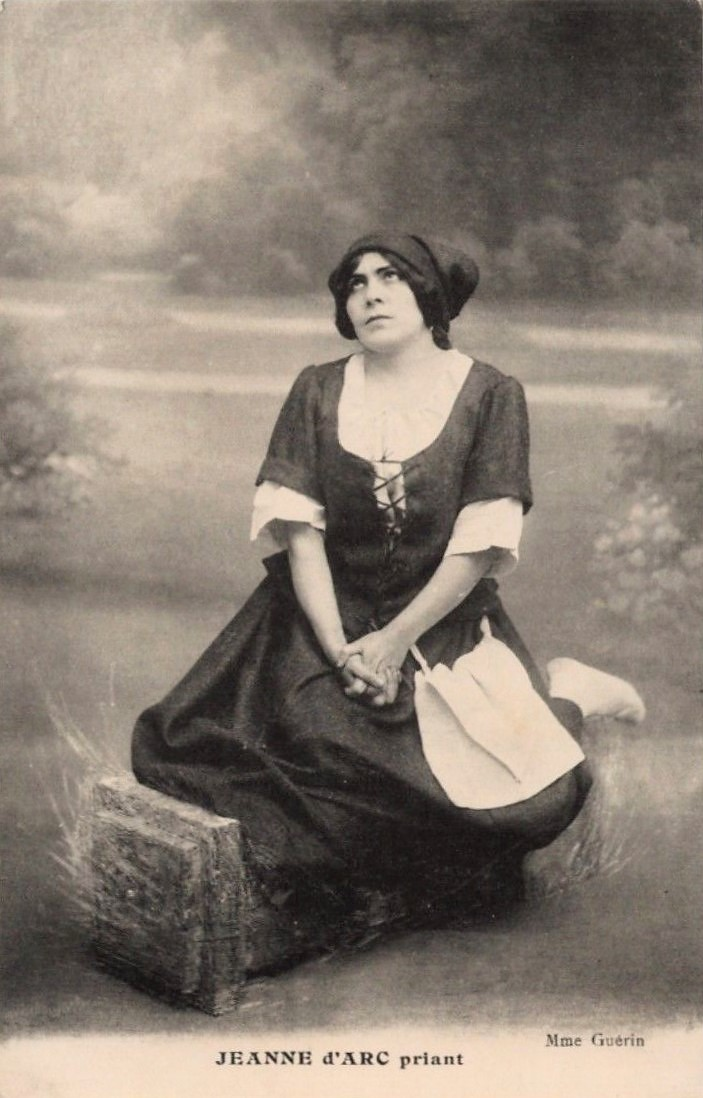
Alliance française lecturer Madame Guérin portraying a praying Jeanne d'Arc.

== Great Britain ==
Now Madame E. Guérin, she went to Great Britain soon after her marriage to Eugène and placed her two daughters in a London boarding school. She lectured in England, Scotland and Northern Ireland for the ‘Alliance Française’ organisation for nearly four years. She was passionate about promoting the French culture and language; and education. Whilst in Great Britain, c1914 Anna was presented with le médaille Officier de l’Instruction Publique by Paul Cambon, the French Ambassador to London. Anna lectured between autumn and spring, spending her summers in France.

== World War I ==
In 1914, before the outbreak of World War I, Anna Guérin had agreed to lecture in the United States. For three years she kept to that arrangement and travelled across the Atlantic in October 1914. Initially, her lectures were under the auspices of the ‘Alliance Française’ but she would discreetly raise funds for French war causes, at the end of her lectures. Those voluntary donations were collected and sent direct to France, via a third party. Once the United States entered the war, Anna raised funds openly, on a public platform. She raised funds for the ‘Food for France’ organisation; French widows and orphans; French veterans (medically discharged without a pension); the American Red Cross and the US Liberty Loan Bonds amongst others. Whilst lecturing for the US Liberty Bonds, Anna Guérin was described by many as the greatest of all war speakers. For her services to the US Liberty Bonds, Anna Guérin was awarded the US 1919 Victory Liberty Loan medal. Anna Guérin returned to France each summer. The influenza pandemic Spanish 'Flu curtailed what was to be her 1918/19 tour. She was halfway across the Atlantic Ocean when the 1918 Armistice was signed.

== Inter-Allied Poppy Day ==
Anna Guérin thought her fundraising days were over. However, after only a few days back home in France, she was summoned to Paris. The French government created ‘La Ligue des enfants de France et d’Amérique’, with the poppy as its emblem. Madame Anna Guérin was tasked with returning to the United States to create the American branch – called the ‘American-Franco Children’s League’ (also known as ‘American Star’ and 'American-French Children's League). The symbolism of the poppy was inspired by the poem In Flanders Fields by Lt. Col. John McCrae, a Canadian military surgeon. Many soldiers were inspired by poppies growing on the battlefields and many picked one and sent it home - such was the poignancy felt, connected to blood spilt.

In each state she visited, Anna Guérin set up a Children's League committee. Membership subscriptions and fundraising events would provide some valuable funds, much needed for orphans in the devastated war-torn regions of France, on a regular basis. In 1919, she began holding Poppy Days in the United States – distributing artificial paper poppies, in exchange for donations. Local women and girls were the mainstay of her operations; poppy sellers wore sashes bearing “In Flanders Fields the poppies grow”.

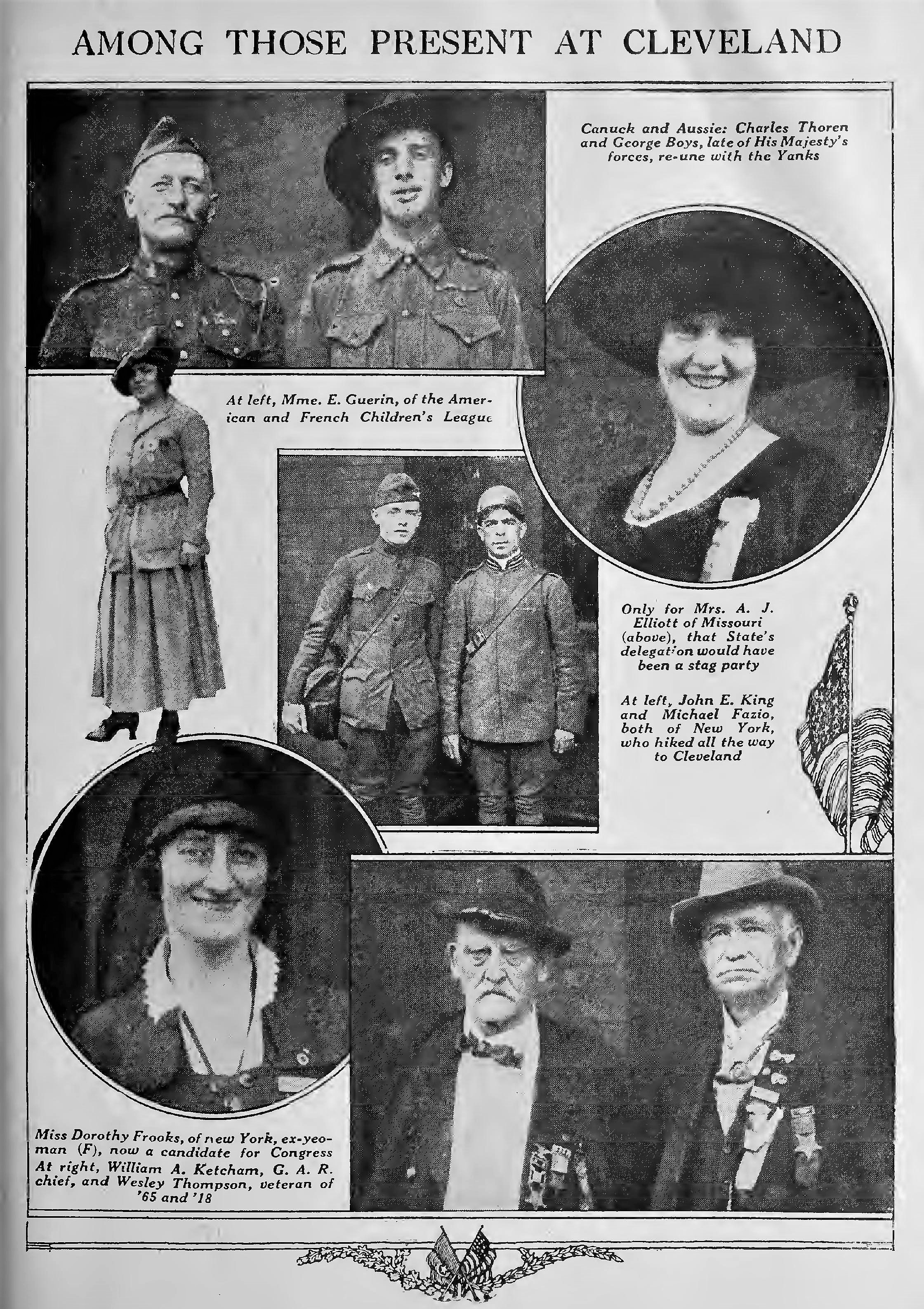
Page 11 of the "Post-Convention" edition of the American Legion Weekly journal of 15 October 1920. Anna Guérin is shown centre/left.

American Legion National Commander Colonel Frederick W. Galbraith Jr. invited Anna to explain her ‘Inter-Allied Poppy Day’ idea at the American Legion Convention in Cleveland, Ohio in September 1920. There, the Legionnaires christened Anna "The Poppy Lady from France"; adopted the poppy as their memorial emblem; and agreed to support her in her Poppy Days.

In April 1921, every American state was informed that the French-made silk poppies (organised by “The Poppy Lady”) had arrived in the United States. The same month, Guérin’s American and French Children’s League underwent an enforced change. If the League was to continue functioning, it had to be recognised by the National Information Bureau in New York City. To this end that, League President Hartley Burr Alexander, wrote to the Bureau’s Director in October 1920. The Bureau gave its approval but with certain caveats, one being that Anna’s Children’s League should have a wider scope and be aligned to its Paris-based committee of La Ligue Americaine-Francaise des Enfants.

On 27 April 1921, the wider scope was achieved by a merger with a newly formed charity, which had Rt. Rev. Herbert Shipman at its helm, reverting to its original American-Franco Children’s League. This merger caused upset. Some old League members did not approve, and were not prepared to move to the new League. These included the old League’s Chairman Mrs. Tyler Perine and its New York State Committee Chairman Mrs. Mercedes McAllister Smith.

The new League took over the old League’s headquarters in New York but the break-away group continued its own poppy campaign, in competition with the new League, working out of Mrs. McAllister Smith’s New York home. Even the US President got caught up with the muddle and the National Information Bureau issued a statement saying that only the new League had been endorsed to sell poppies, no other.

It all resulted in Mrs. McAllister Smith bringing a $200,000 court case against the Right Rev. Herbert Shipman (Bishop Suffragan of the Diocese of New York); Maurice Leon (member of law firm Evarts, Choate, Sherman & Leon; writer; representative of the French Government during the War); George W. Burleigh (Judge Advocate-General of the New York National Guard); Bronson Batchelor (of Bronson Batchelor Inc., publicity agency); Roger B. Jenkins (officer of the Bronson Batchelor Inc. agency); Barry N. Smith (Head of the National Information Bureau); and Anna Guérin. The case was eventually dismissed.

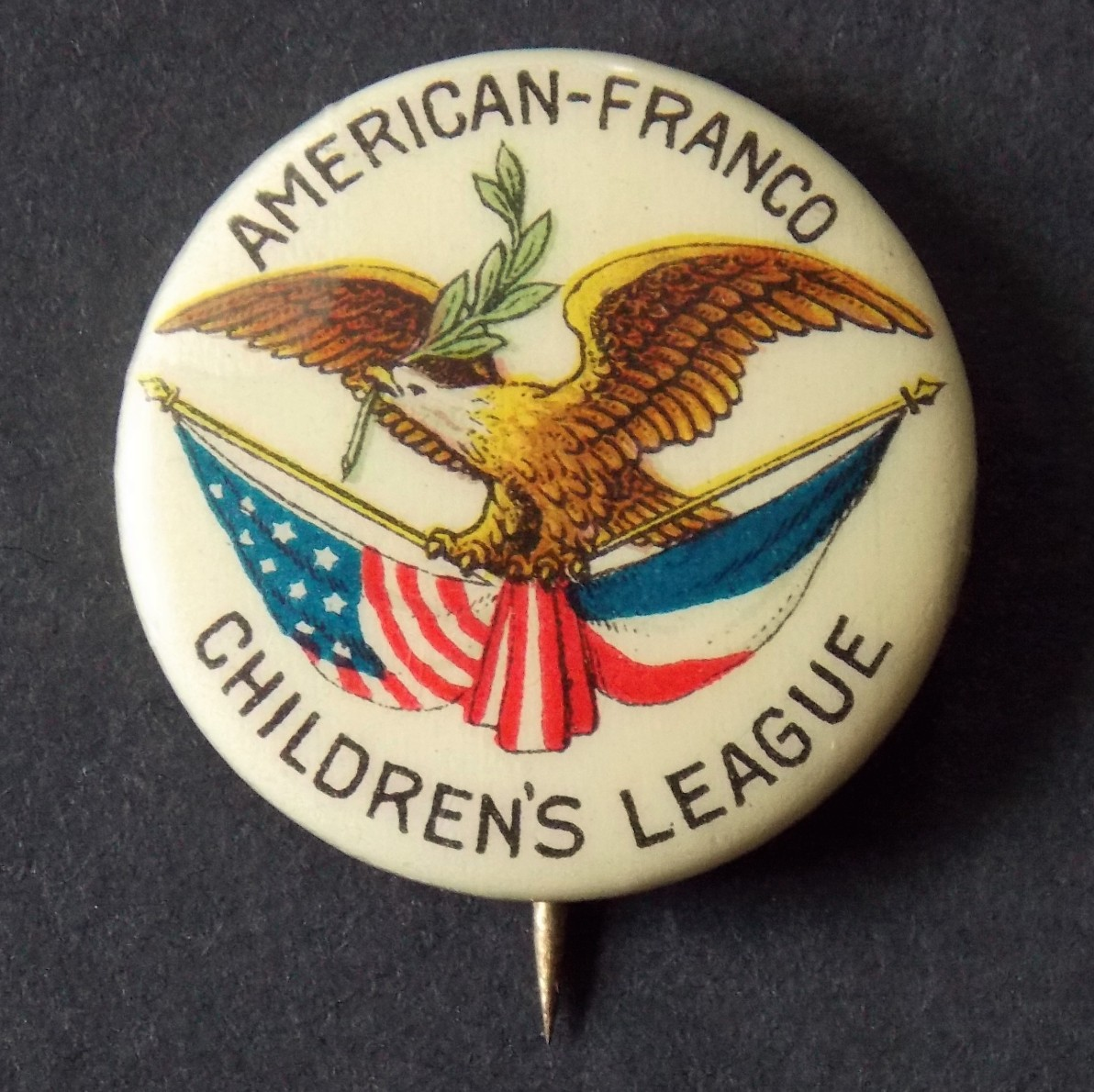
An 'American-Franco Children's League' badge c1921.

During the week before America’s Memorial Day (or Decoration Day), on 30 May 1921, Guérin and her ‘American-Franco Children’s League’ carried out the very first nation-wide Poppy Drive in the world: carrying out Poppy Days in every State. Leading up to the Poppy Drive, articles appeared all over the country, appealing for “every man, woman and child” to wear a poppy. In these Poppy Days, the charity was supported by the American Legion, and its Women’s Auxiliary; the ‘War Mothers of America’ (Service Star Mothers); Women’s clubs and other organisations.

At the beginning of November 1921, Guérin attended the next American Legion Convention, Kansas City, Missouri. She had been personally invited but she also went to try and persuade the delegates from reneging on the poppy, as their memorial flower - in favour of the daisy. This was to no avail, the daisy was adopted and Daisy Days occurred.

Although the American Legion’s Women’s Auxiliary kept the poppy as its memorial flower, by 23 January 1922, it decided not to continue giving support to Guérin’s American and French Children’s League’s Poppy Days and it did not purchase French-made poppies. The Veterans of Foreign Wars filled the void the American Legion vacated. As a consequence, in May 1922, it was the Veterans of Foreign Wars that became the first veteran organisation to carry out the very first nation-wide Poppy Drive in the United States.

In October 1922, the American Legion repudiated the daisy and again adopted the poppy. For the 1923 US Poppy Days, both the Veterans of Foreign Wars and the American Legion purchased French-made poppies from Guérin. For the 1924 US Poppy Days, the Veterans of Foreign Wars had patented its own “Buddy” poppy, made by veterans. In 1924, the American Legion’s veterans could not make enough poppies and again French-made poppies were ordered through Anna Guérin.

Canada was next for Anna Guérin. On 4 July 1921, she spoke about her ‘Inter-Allied Poppy Day’ idea to men of the Canadian Great War Veterans’ Association (G.W.V.A.) in Port Arthur, Ontario (now Thunder Bay). On 6 July, the Canadian veterans adopted it. The Canadians were the first of the British Empire veterans to do so. In 1922, the bulk of poppies were made by Canadian disabled veterans. Anna handed the poppy mantle over to Captain James Learmonth Melville, M.C., who was Principal of the Vocational School for Disabled Soldiers. In 1923, Lillian Bilsky Freiman’s ‘Vetcraft’ disabled veterans took over the manufacture of Canadian Remembrance Poppies.

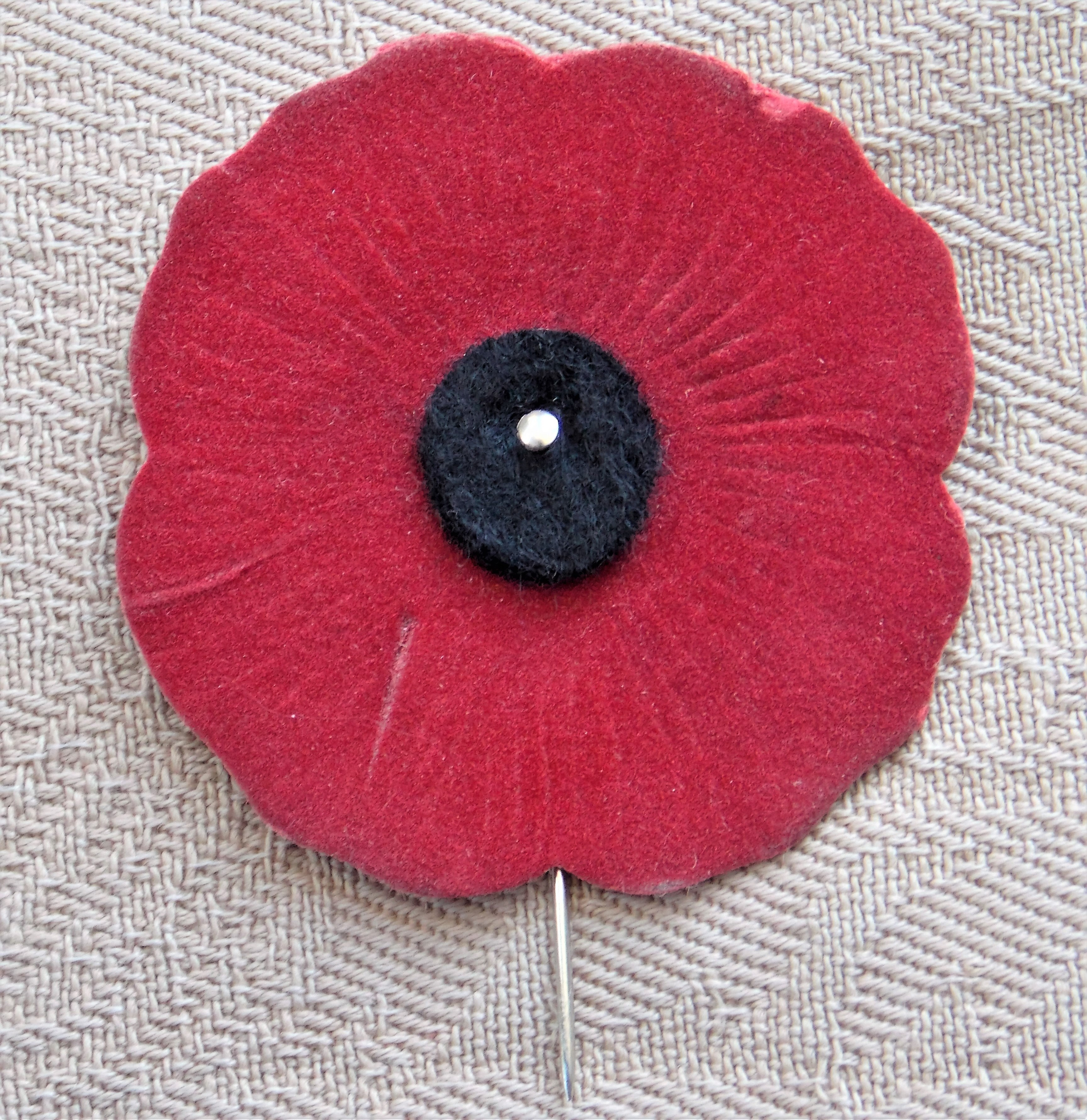
A vintage Canadian Vetcraft Remembrance Poppy.

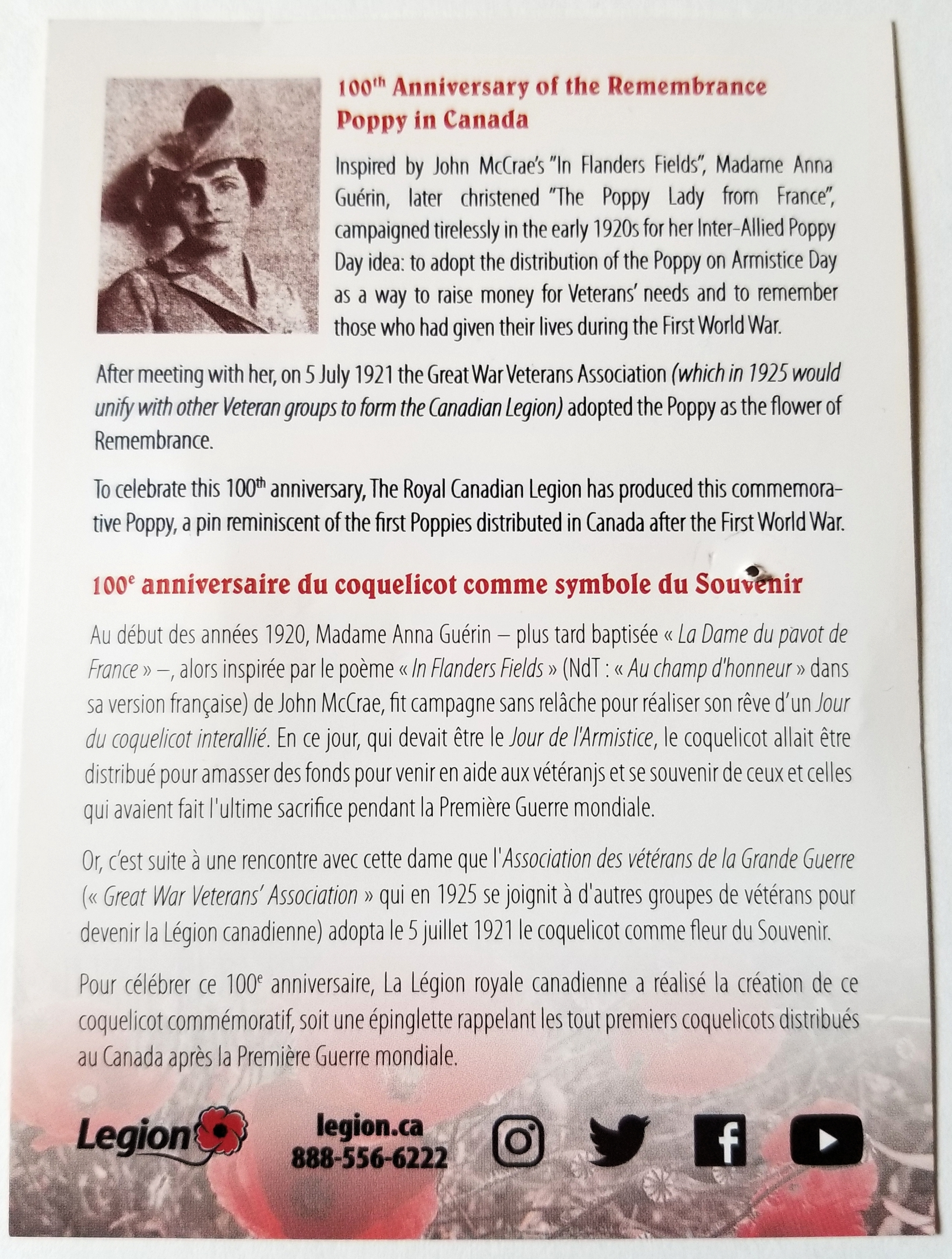
A card produced in 2021, that accompanied the Royal Canadian Legion's 'Tribute' poppy commemorating the centenary of the Poppy Day.

Newfoundland was a Dominion of the British Empire and not part of Canada at the time. Although Newfoundland and Canada were intrinsically linked by their geographical positions, Newfoundland did not become part of Canada until 1949. How it came to adopt Guérin’s ‘Inter-Allied Poppy Day’ is not known but it did. There were Great War Veterans’ Association veterans in Newfoundland as well as in Canada so, perhaps, that was how. The Ladies Auxiliary of the G.W.V.A., made all the preparations, in conjunction with the National War Memorial Committee. By 21 October 1921, 12,000 poppies had already been ordered by Newfoundland G.W.V.A. Newfoundland’s first Poppy Day was held on 11 November 1921, Armistice Day. Another memorial flower, the Forget-Me-Not, is revered in Newfoundland. They serve to commemorate those of the Royal Newfoundland Regiment who lost their lives on 1 July 1916 at Beaumont-Hamel, on the Somme. No more French-made poppies were purchased from Anna Guérin after 1921. The [Royal] Canadian Legion became responsible for poppy campaigns thereafter. In 2021, the Royal Canadian Legion honoured Anna with a 'Tribute' Poppy - a small poppy within a cellophane envelope, together by a bi-lingual information card on Anna Guérin: 100th Anniversary of the Remembrance Poppy in Canada.

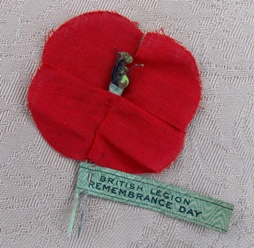
A 1921 French-made British Legion cotton Remembrance Poppy.

Great Britain was the next to receive Guérin’s attention. She landed at the Port of Liverpool, at 7.30 a.m., on 30 August 1921. She took examples of her French-made poppies to the British Legion men and explained her ‘Inter-Allied Poppy Day’ idea. The Legion was very sceptical and Anna Guérin’s credentials had to be verified but, before September was out, the British had adopted the ‘Inter-Allied Poppy Day’ idea. Because the British Legion was a very poor organisation, Anna Guérin paid for the British remembrance poppies herself and the British Legion reimbursed her, after the first British Poppy Day on 11 November 1921. Guérin was very rarely credited in the British newspapers and “widows and children of French soldiers” were sometimes mentioned but often the poppy makers were referred to as “peasants”. No more French-made poppies were purchased from Anna Guérin after 1921. From 1922 onwards, British veterans made Remembrance Poppies at The Poppy Factory and, from 1926, at Lady Haig's Poppy Factory. In 1971, the British Legion became the Royal British Legion.

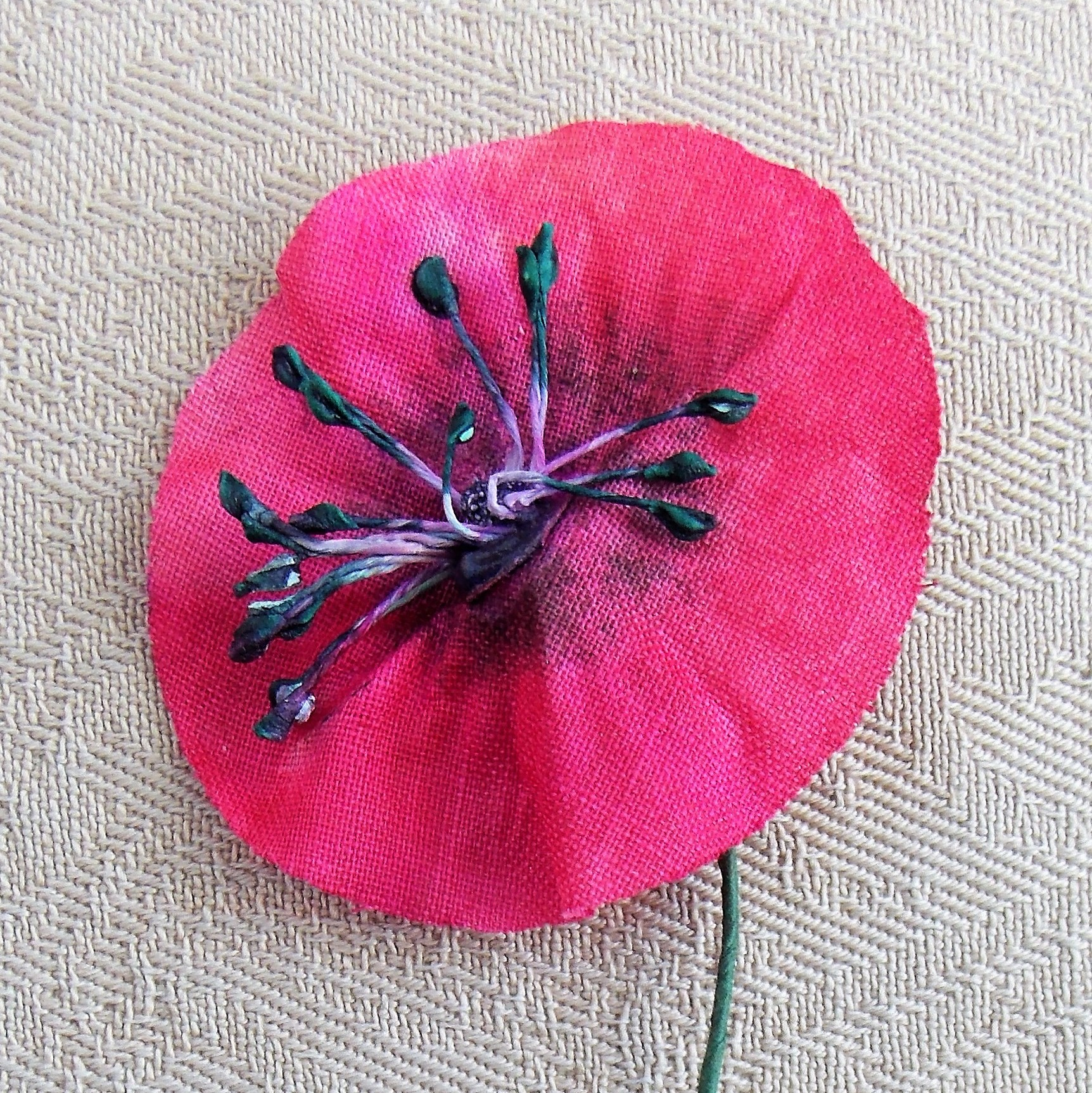
An Australian Remembrance Poppy, c1941.

Australia was very faithful to Anna Guérin, continuing to be loyal to French-made poppies until 1926, inclusive. The country's veterans had adopted Anna Guérin's ‘Inter-Allied Poppy Day’ idea before her representative Colonel Moffat arrived so he did not need to persuade, only promote and help organise the Poppy Day campaign. At the 6th annual congress of the ‘Returned Sailors and Soldiers Imperial League of Australia’ in Brisbane (5 August 1921), it was declared that the decision was suggested by Canada. Australia's first Poppy Day was on 11 November 1921, Armistice Day. Although Anna never visited Australia, she maintained communication with the Australian veterans, over the years. Newspapers tracked Colonel Moffat's movements and recorded all facts about the country's Poppy Days.

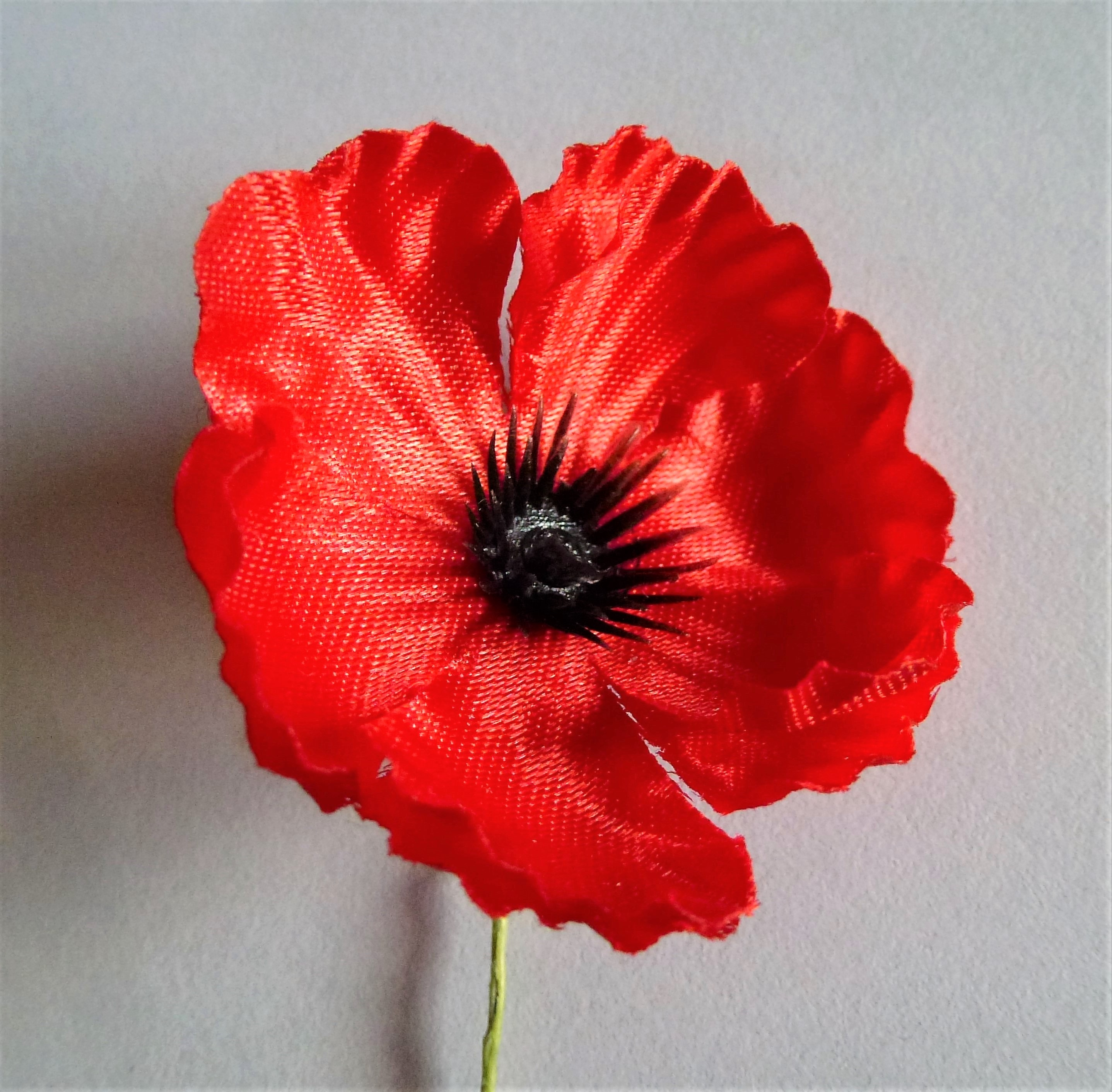
A 2016 New Zealand Remembrance Poppy.

New Zealand was the most loyal of the World War I Allied nations to Madame Guérin. The country continued to purchase French-made poppies through until 1928, inclusive. On 26 September 1921, the Dominion Executive of the Returned Soldiers' Association passed a resolution to adopt the red poppy and Anna Guérin's Poppy Day idea. They ordered and paid for 350,000 of them for Armistice Day but the ship 'SS Canadian Scottish' arrived too late and wanting to recover their costs, the Royal New Zealand Returned and Services Association Inc sold them on the next available commemoration date and that was Anzac Day 1922. When dates for Poppy Day were initially discussed in New Zealand, both Anzac Day (25 April) and on Remembrance Day / Armistice Day (11 November) were possibilities - poppies are worn on both dates. As with Australia, Guérin never visited New Zealand but she maintained contact with its veterans. Many New Zealand women remained “representatives” of Madame Guérin through those years and they gave talks at schools etc., promoting her idea. New Zealand newspapers tracked Col. Moffat's movements and recorded facts about the country's Poppy Days.

== Later life ==
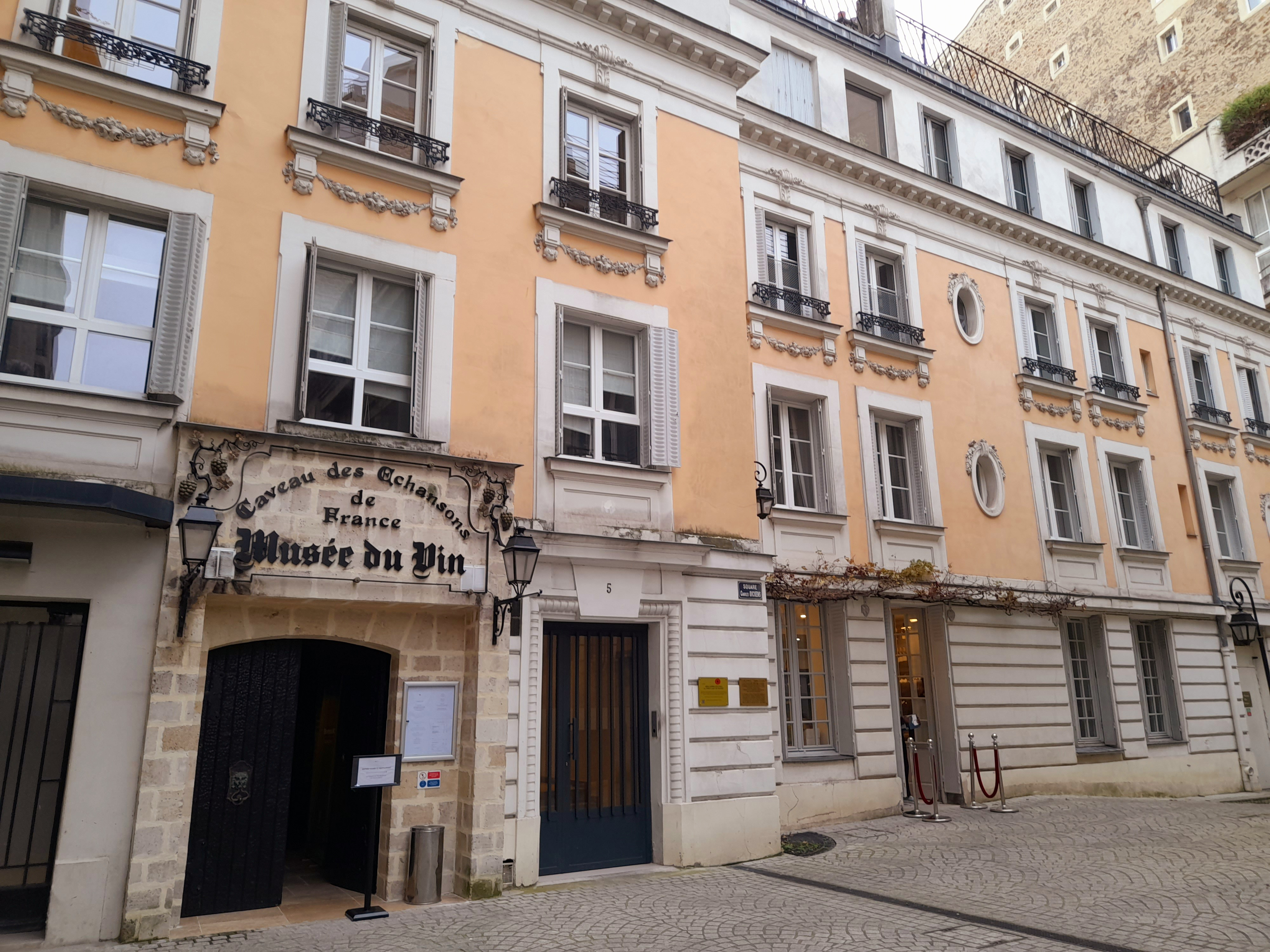
5 Charles Dickens Square, Paris 16 - where Anna Guérin died.

After 1921, Anna Guérin continued to visit the US, sailing across the Atlantic twice a year on average. More often than not, it was via the Cherbourg – New York shipping route. For a few years, she ran a shop selling French antiques in New York – sister Juliette Boulle and friend Blanche Berneron managed it, whenever she was not in the United States. In 1941, Anna Guérin wrote a synopsis which documented all her fundraising in the US, from 1914 to 1921. Guérin spent the World War II years in the United States. Madame Guérin died on 16 April 1961, at 5 Charles Dickens Square, Paris.

Hommages

On 11 November 2021, for the first time in France, a ceremony was organised in Aubigny-sur-Nère by the Office National des Anciens Combattants et Victimes de Guerre (ONACVG) and the local authorities, where a place was dedicated to the French Poppy Lady - 'Espace Anna Guérin'. On this same occasion, the exhibition "Le Chant de la Mémoire" ["The Song of Memory"] was presented, a series of paintings commissioned by the departmental director of ONACVG (Claude Vigoureux) to the artist Ama Perri on the theme of war and peace using memorial flowers, the cornflower and the poppy. On the same day, in Vallon-Pont-d'Arc, an exhibition about Anna Guérin took place.

On 8 March 2022, at Vallon-Pont-d'Arc in the Ardèche, plaques were dedicated to Anna Boulle-Guérin in the town - at her place of birth and at her grave in the Protestant cemetery.

During the weekend of 18/19 June 2022, at Montreuil-sur-Mer in Pas-de-Calais, an exhibition about Anna Guérin took place. A set of ten bi-lingual panels plus a collection of Remembrance Poppies, from around the world, was also displayed. Since then, more exhibitions have taken place in Vallon-Pont-d'Arc and le Pouzin (Ardèche); and Guainville (Eure-et-Loir).

On 20 September 2022, a Souvenir Français dedication plaque was placed on Anna's grave. The ethos of the Souvenir Français is to maintain war memorials, graves and war memory.

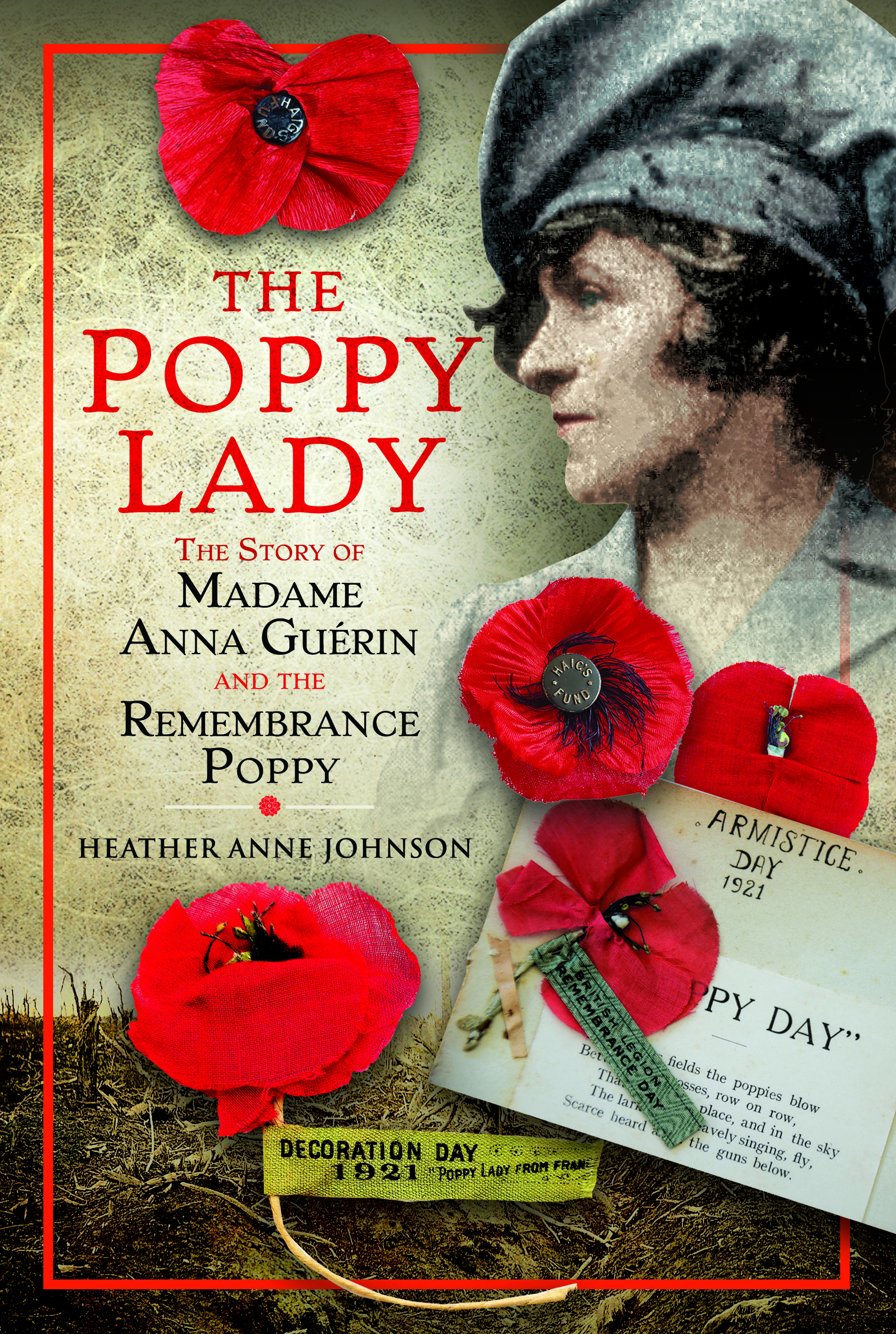
The front cover of 'The Poppy Lady The Story of Madame Anna Guérin and the Remembrance Poppy' by Heather A. Johnson (Pen & Sword)

On 12 December 2022, Heather Anne Johnson's biography about Anna Guérin was published by Pen and Sword - 'The Poppy Lady The Story of Madame Anna Guérin and the Remembrance Poppy' (ISBN 978-1-3990-7372-1).

From 1-30 November 2024, an exhibition about Anna Guérin took place at Centre Azincourt 1415, Azincourt, Pas-de-Calais - exhibiting the ten bi-lingual panels that described Anna's life.

On 8 November 2024, at the Musée du Vin, 5 Square Charles Dickens, Paris (XVI°/16th arrondissement), France, a plaque was unveiled and dedicated to Anna Guérin who died at that address on 16 April 1961.

On 17 December 2024, Claude Vigoureux (ONACVG Director of Cher and historian) was welcomed at the Mairie of the XVI°/16th arrondissement of Paris. He gave a lecture about Anna Guérin. This event was 'Tuesdays of Memory' / Les Mardis de la Mémoire

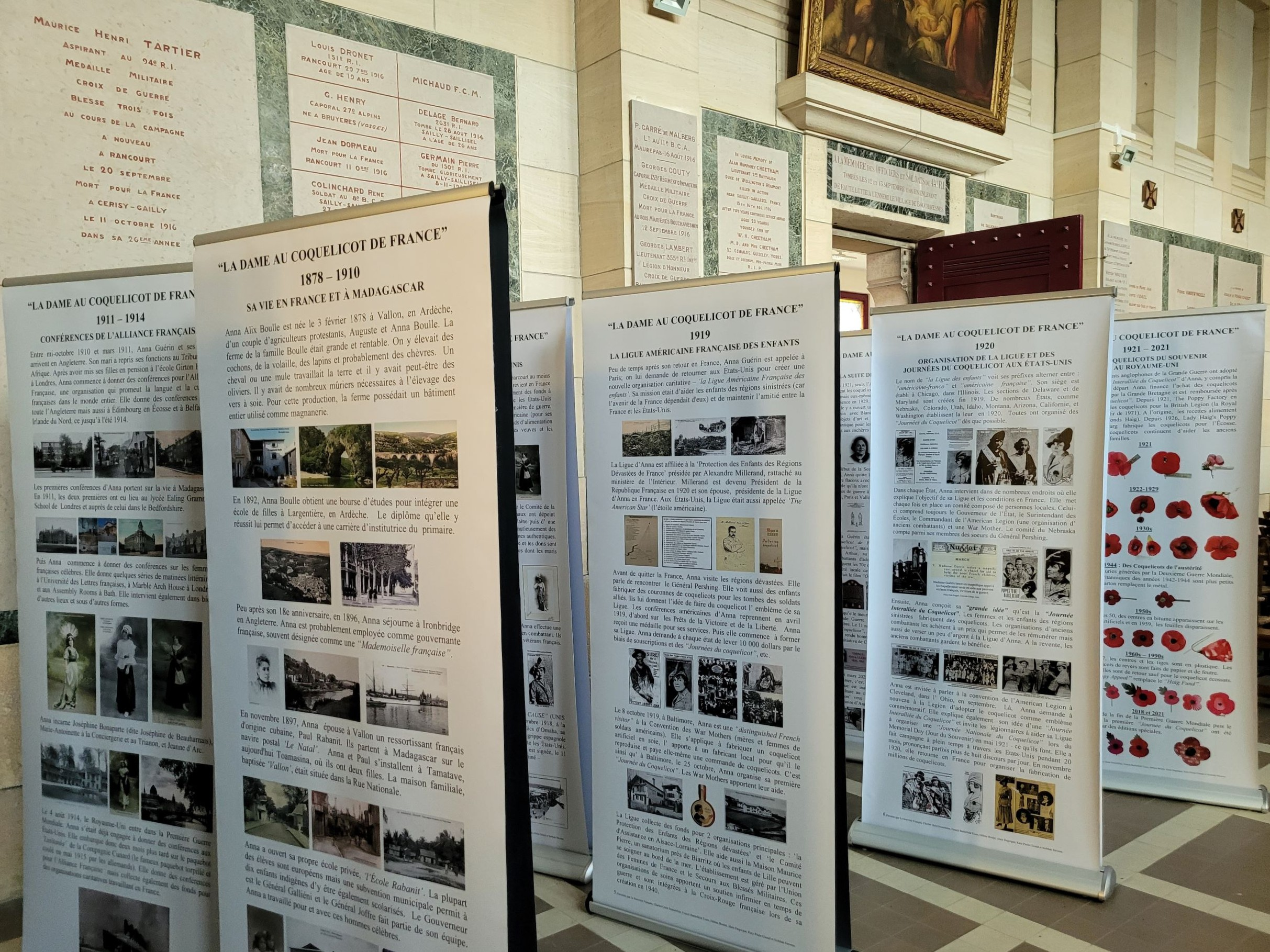
Some of the bi-lingual panels exhibited at la Chapelle du Souvenir Français, Rancourt et Bouchavesnes-Bergen, Somme, France.

From 14 May to 13 July 2025, the ten bi-lingual panels about Anna Guérin's life were exhibited at La chapelle du Souvenir Français, Rancourt et Bouchavesnes-Bergen, Somme, France.

On 24 October 2025, the 'Then and Now Remembrance' project at Colchester Museums Castle featured Anna Guérin. A selection of British remembrance poppies were exhibited and a touchscreen presented the information held on the ten bi-lingual panels. The display ceased on 22 January 2026.

On 30 October 2025, Anna Guérin was the subject of an evening lecture at Privas, in the Ardèche, by Claude Vigoureux, historian and ONACVG director for Cher. This was the initiative of the Souvenir Français of Privas. Claude Vigoureux's set of ten bi-lingual panels were exhibited with the lecture. Since that date, the Souvenir Français de Privas have arranged for the panels to be seen at other towns in the vicinity.
