= Poppy Factory =

Manufacturer of Remembrance Day poppies

The Poppy Factory
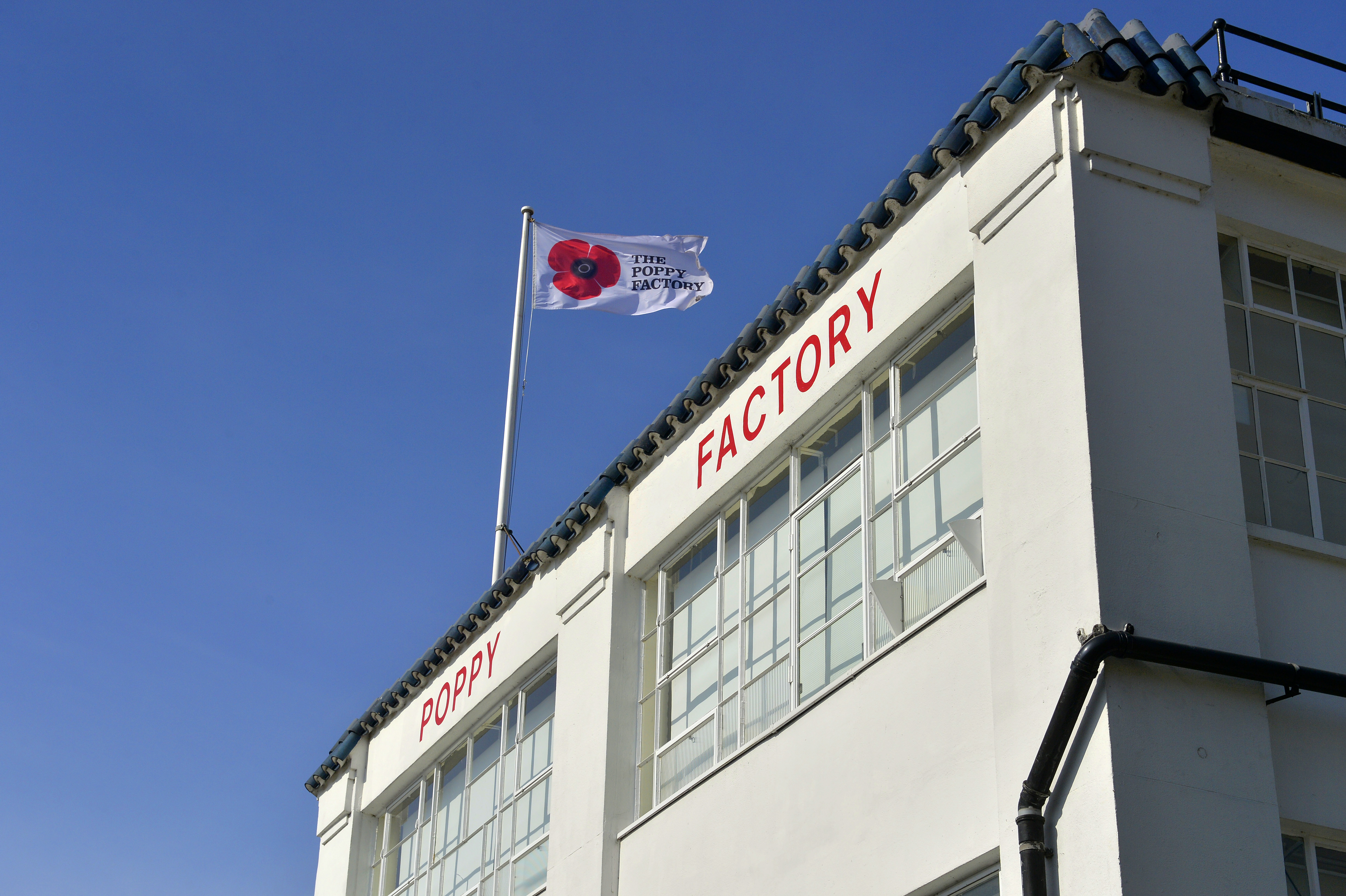
- The Poppy Factory in Richmond, London
- Formation: 1922
- Type: Charity
- Headquarters: Richmond-upon-Thames
- Location: Richmond, London
- Region served: United Kingdom; 51°27′20″N 0°18′10″W
- Official language: English
- Website: www.poppyfactory.org

The Poppy Factory is a factory in Richmond, London, England, where remembrance wreaths are made. It was founded in 1922 to offer employment opportunities to wounded soldiers returning from the First World War, creating remembrance poppies and wreaths for the Royal Family and the Royal British Legion's annual Poppy Appeal. It is operated by a company that is a registered charity which provides employment support to veterans with health conditions across England and Wales. The factory's production team continues to make remembrance wreaths by hand today.

The corresponding organisation in Scotland is Lady Haig's Poppy Factory in Edinburgh, which was established in 1926 and makes approximately five million remembrance poppies each year.

== The Poppy Factory in England ==
Artificial poppies for the first poppy appeal in 1921 were imported from France by Madame Anna Guérin.

In 1922 the Disabled Society, a charity established in 1920 by Major George Howson MC and Major Jack Cohen, received a grant of £2,000 from the British Legion's Unity Relief Fund to employ disabled ex-service personnel to make remembrance poppies in England. Later that year, Howson wrote to his parents, "I do not think it can be a great success, but it is worth trying. I consider the attempt ought to be made if only to give the disabled their chance."

They set up in a former collar factory on the Old Kent Road in London. Soon the factory was employing 50 disabled veterans.

In November 1924, the Prince of Wales (later Edward VIII) visited the Poppy Factory, which made 27 million poppies that year. Most of the employees were disabled, and by then there was a long waiting list for prospective employees.

The old collar factory eventually proved too small as demand increased, and in 1926 the factory moved to a disused brewery in Petersham Road, Richmond, Surrey. The Poppy Factory organised the first annual Field of Remembrance at Westminster Abbey in 1928. The current Art Deco Poppy Factory building was built on the brewery site and was completed in 1933.

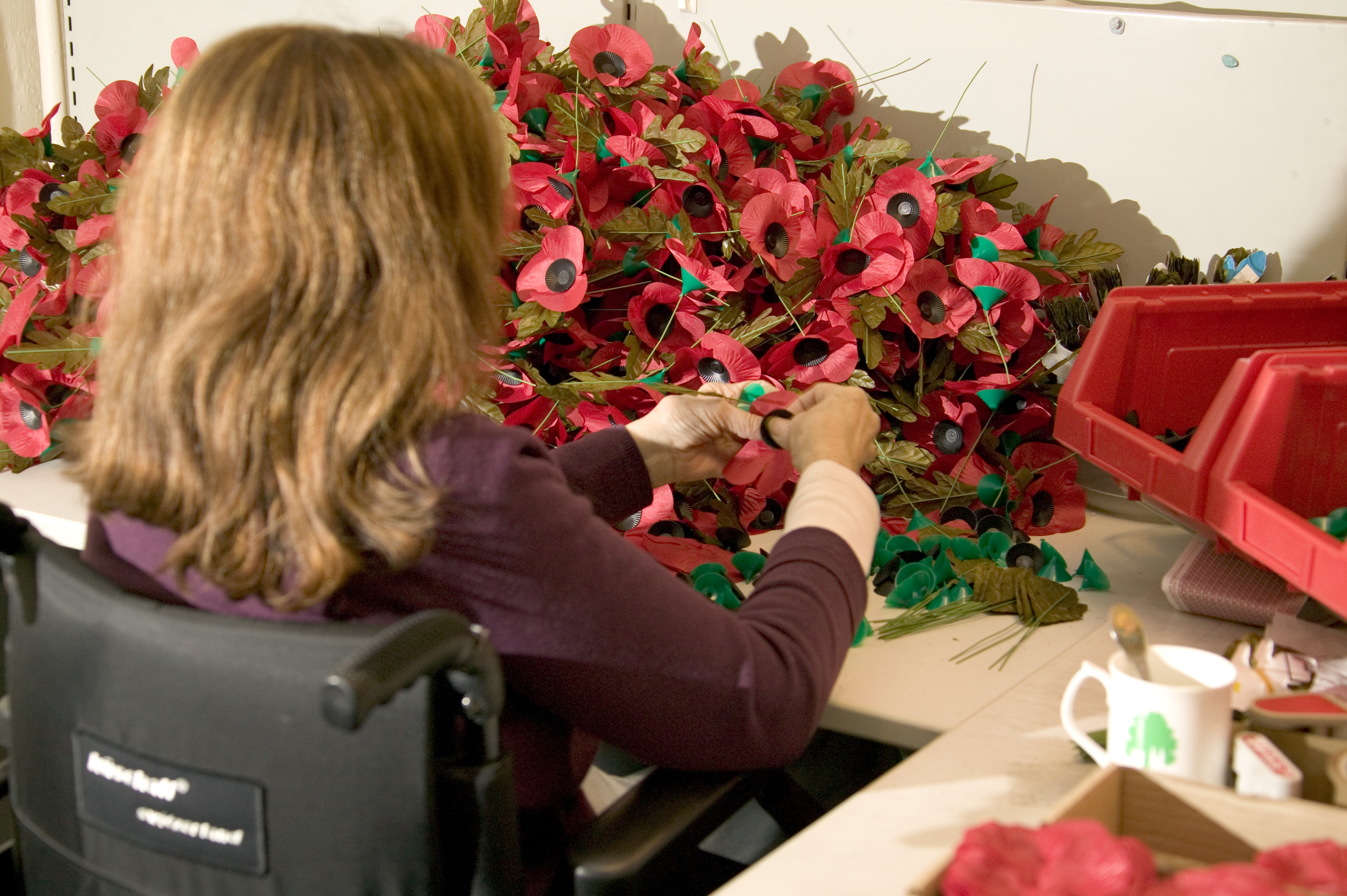
A volunteer assembles remembrance poppies at the Royal British Legion Poppy Factory, Richmond

In November 2016, former chief executive Melanie Waters became the chief executive of Help for Heroes charity. Deirdre Mills was later appointed the new chief executive; she had previously been a Director at the Commonwealth War Graves Commission.

In July 2017, Queen Elizabeth II visited the factory to celebrate the charity's 90th anniversary. In February 2024, Queen Camilla held a reception at Clarence House to mark the Poppy Factory's centenary.

== Lady Haig's Poppy Factory in Scotland ==
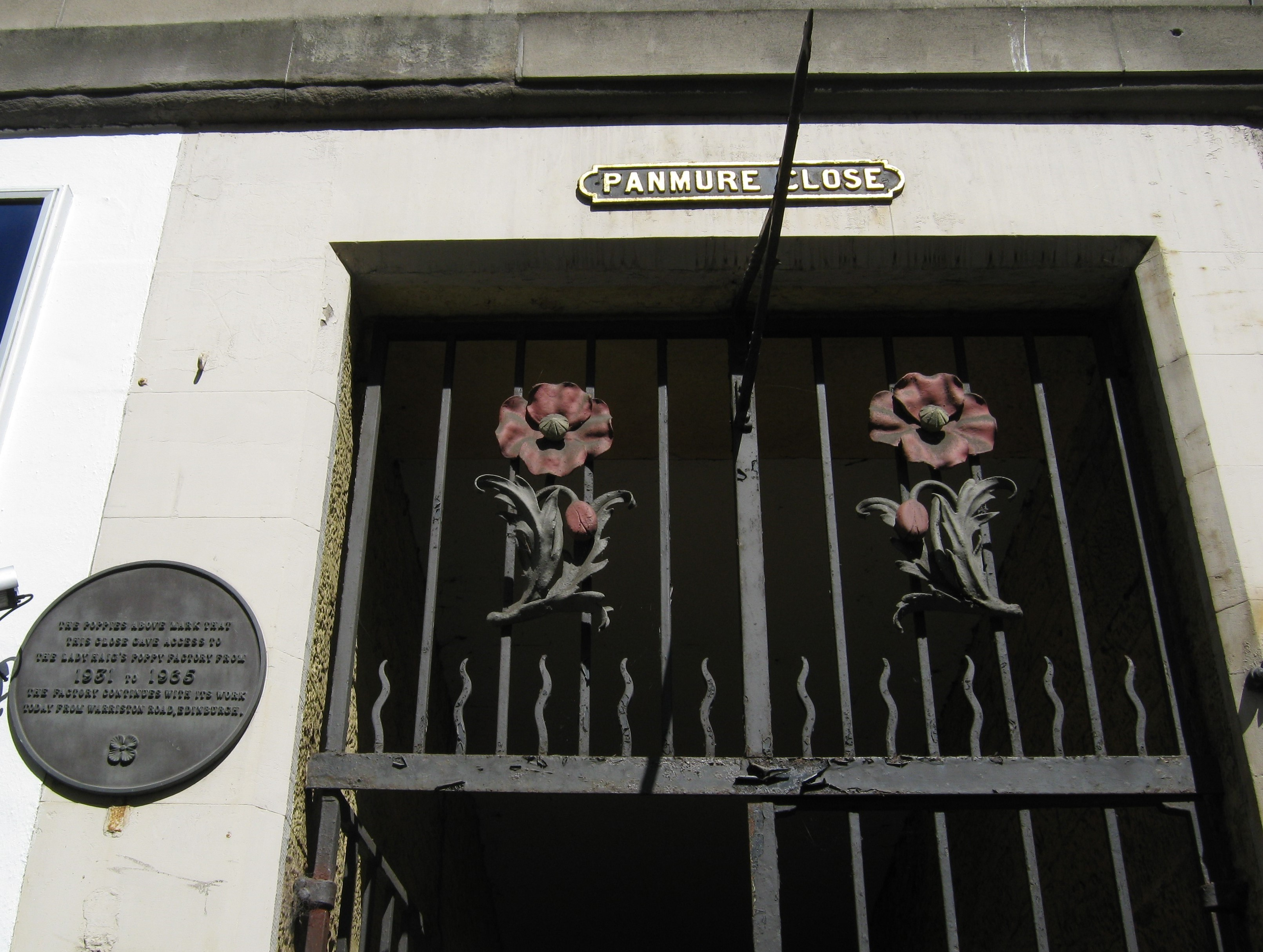
Former site of Lady Haig's Poppy Factory in Edinburgh from 1931 to 1965

Lady Haig's Poppy Factory was founded in Edinburgh in March 1926, shortly after the Royal British Legion's factory in London, as independent charity to provide employment to disabled veterans. Lady Haig's Poppy Factory became a trading name of Poppyscotland of which it is a subsidiary.

The factory was created at the suggestion of and by Dorothy, Countess Haig, wife of Field Marshal Douglas Haig, 1st Earl Haig, who had created the Haig Fund to assist ex-servicemen and which still raises funds through the UK's annual poppy appeal.

It was established in a former wood-chopping factory in the grounds of Whitefoord House. The factory moved to its current premises, a former printing works in Warriston Road, in 1965.

In November 2018 the factory was moved for two years into Redford Barracks while major renovations could be made while also adding a new learning facility.

Like the Poppy Factory in Richmond, it employs ex-service personnel, all of them disabled. It makes five million remembrance poppies in Edinburgh each year, to a slightly different design with four-lobed petals rather than two for English poppies, and 12,000 wreaths.

== Remembrance poppies ==
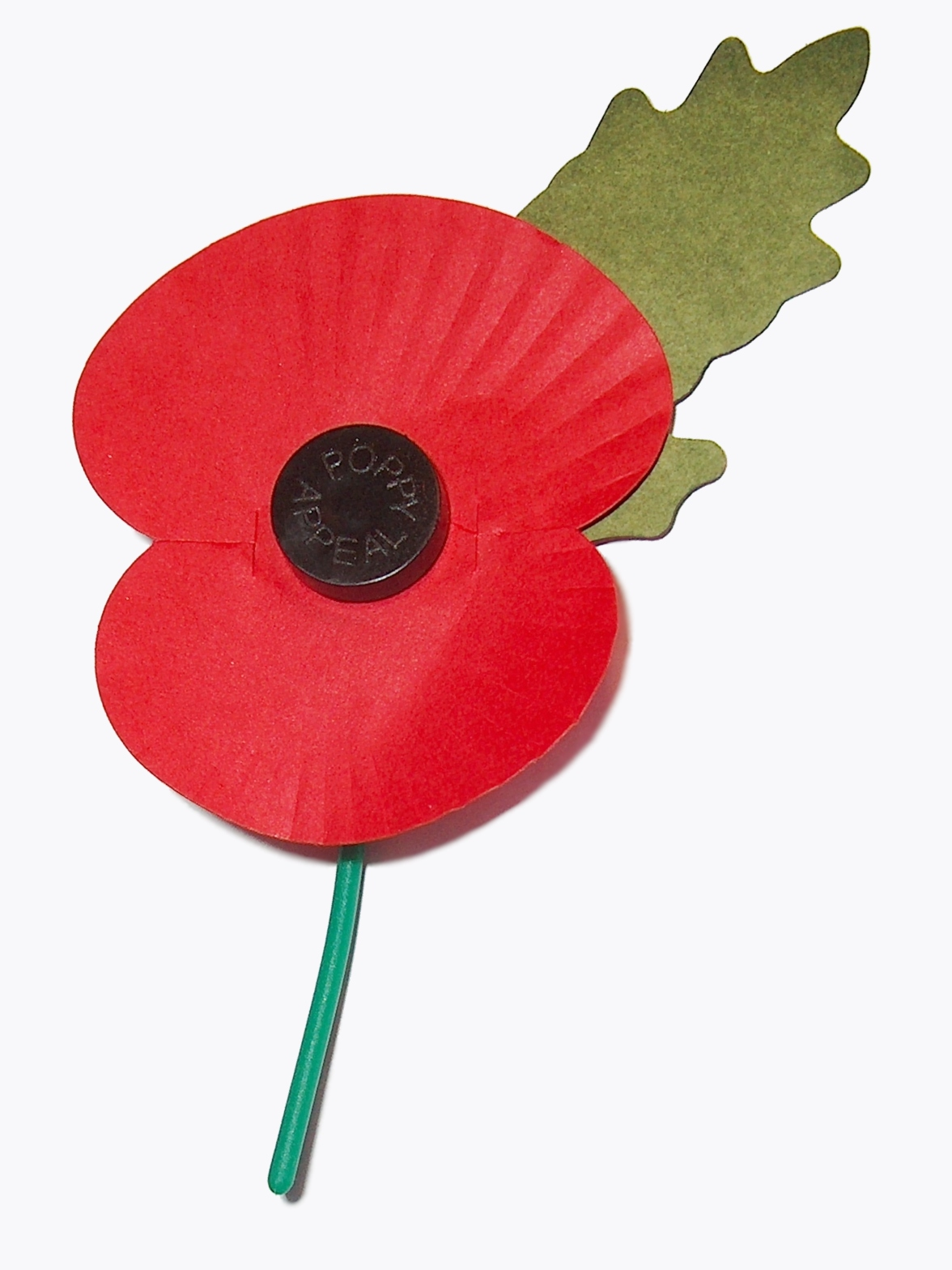
Royal British Legion pin poppy

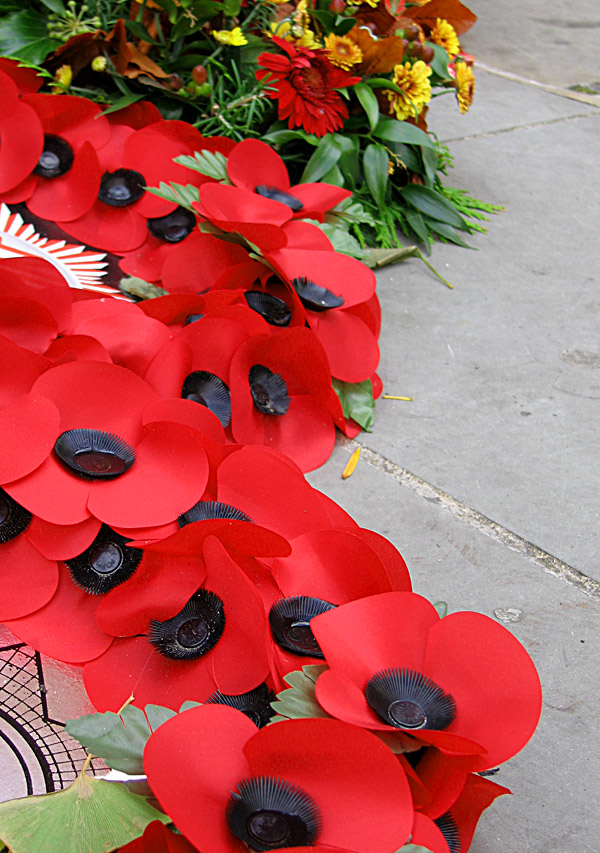
Royal British Legion wreath poppies

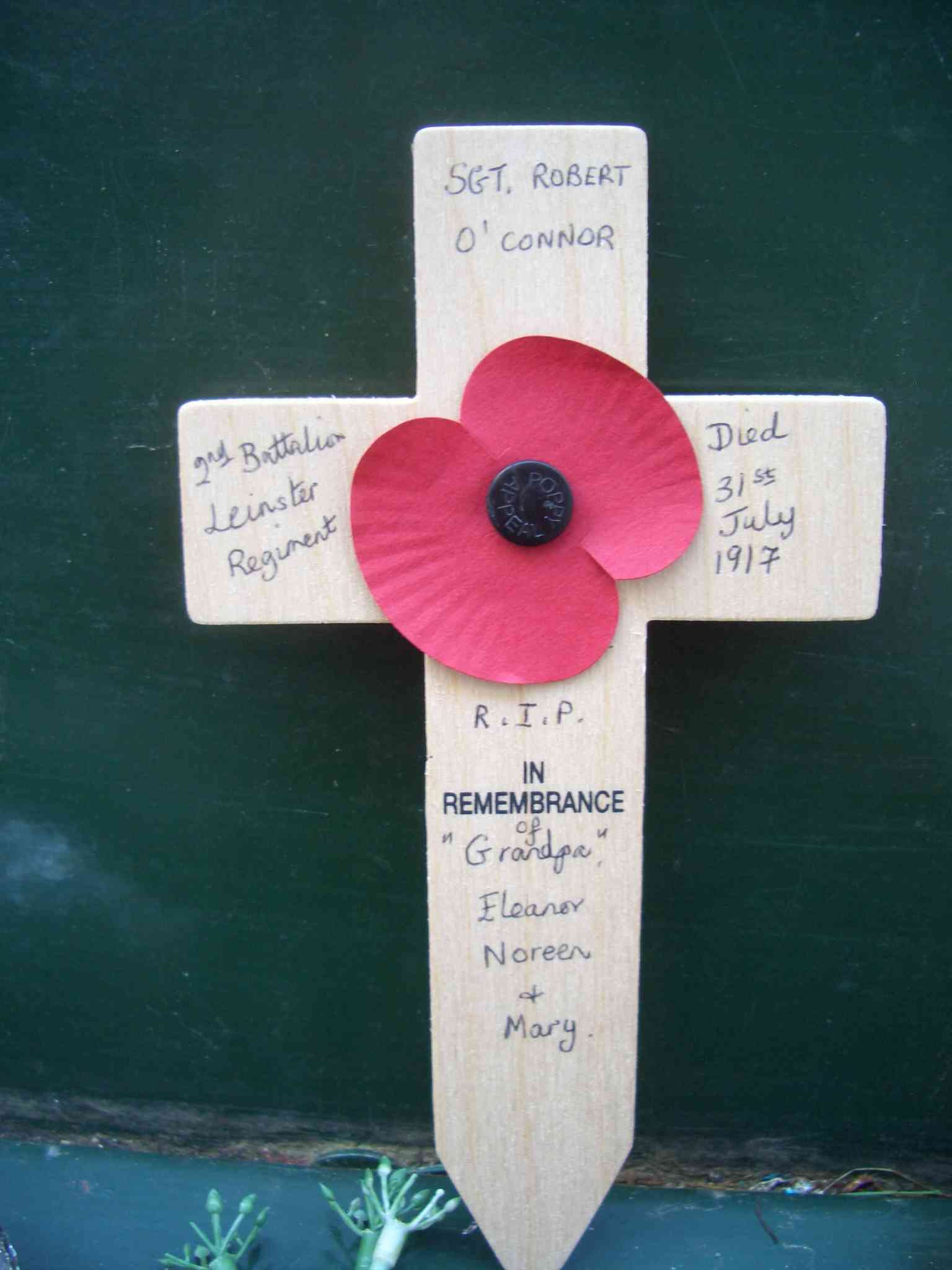
Royal British Legion remembrance cross

== See also ==
- Richmond Brewery Stores
