= Girton College, Cambridge =

College of the University of Cambridge

Girton College
- University of Cambridge
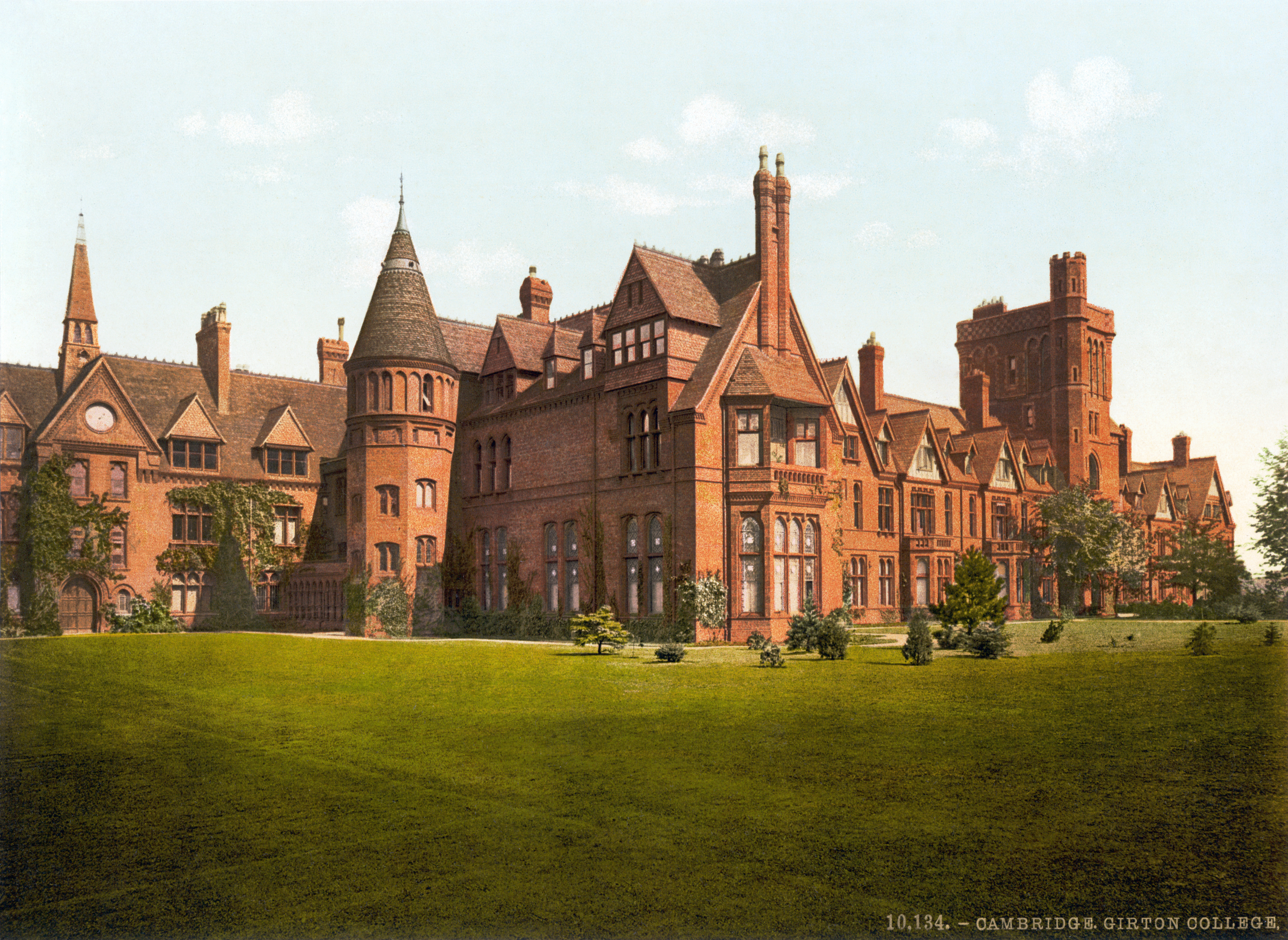
- Girton College during the 1890s

- Arms: see below
Scarf colours: green, with two equally-spaced narrow stripes of red edged with white
- Location: Huntingdon Road (map)
- Coordinates: 52.2286°N 0.0839°E
- Latin name: Collegium Girtonensis
- Abbreviation: G
- Motto: Better is wisdom than weapons of war
- Founders: Emily Davies; Barbara Bodichon
- Established: 16 October 1869; 157 years ago
- Named after: Girton, Cambridgeshire
- Former names: College for Women (until 1871)
- Sister college: Somerville College, Oxford
- Mistress: Elisabeth Kendall
- Undergraduates: 534 (2022–23)
- Postgraduates: 410 (2022–23)
- Endowment: £72.9m (2023)
- Visitor: Brenda Hale, Baroness Hale of Richmond
- Website: www.girton.cam.ac.uk
- JCR: www.girtonjcr.co.uk
- MCR: www-mcr.girton.cam.ac.uk
- Boat club: Girton College Boat Club

Map
- Location within Cambridgeshire

Girton College is a constituent college of the University of Cambridge. The college was established in 1869 by Emily Davies and Barbara Bodichon as the first women's college at Cambridge. In 1948, it was granted full college status by the university, marking the official admittance of women to the university. In 1976, it was the first Cambridge women's college to become coeducational. Its sister college is Somerville College, one of the two Oxford colleges to first admit women.

The main college site is situated on the outskirts of Girton, about 2 1/2 mi (4 km) northwest of the university town, and comprises around 50 acres (20 ha) of land. In a typical Victorian red-brick design, most was built by architect Alfred Waterhouse between 1872 and 1887.

Among Girton's notable alumni are Queen Margrethe II, former UK Supreme Court President Lady Hale, HuffPost co-founder Arianna Huffington, the comedian/author Sandi Toksvig, the comedian/broadcaster/GP Phil Hammond, the economist Joan Robinson, and the anthropologist Marilyn Strathern, who also held the position of Mistress from 1998 to 2009.

== History ==
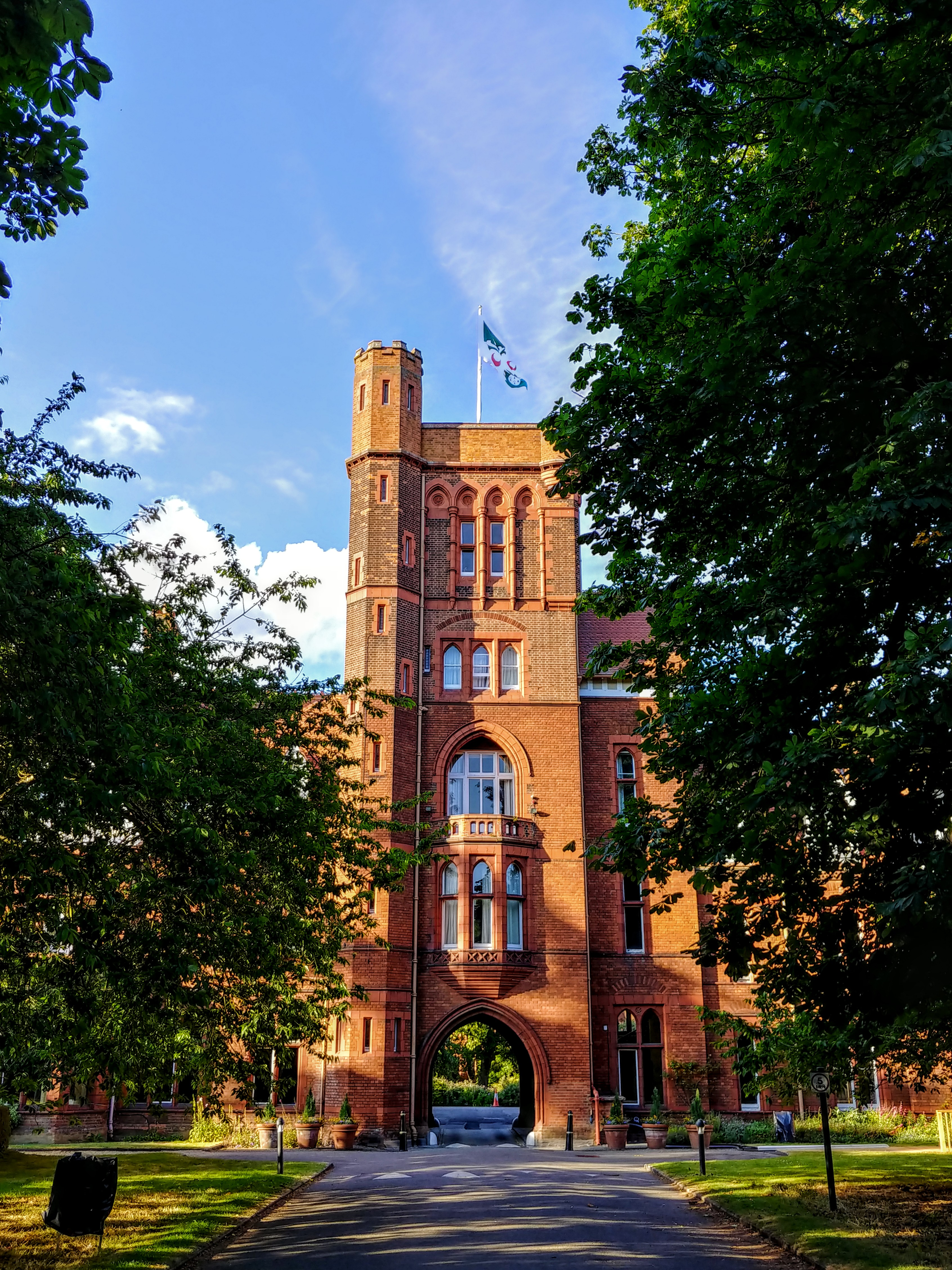
Main gate with porter's lodge

=== 1869 to 1976: Pioneering for women's education ===
The early feminist movement began to argue for the improvement of women's education in the 1860s: Emily Davies and Barbara Bodichon met through their activism at the Society for the Employment of Women and The Englishwoman's Review. They shared the aim of securing women's admission to university. In particular, they wanted to determine whether girls could be admitted at Oxford or Cambridge to sit the Senior and Junior Local Examinations. Davies and Bodichon set up a committee to that effect in 1862. In 1865, with the help of Henry Tomkinson, Trinity College alumnus and the owner of an insurance company with good contacts within the University, 91 female students entered the Cambridge Local Examination. This first concession to women's educational rights met relatively little resistance, as admission to the examination did not imply residence of women at the university site.

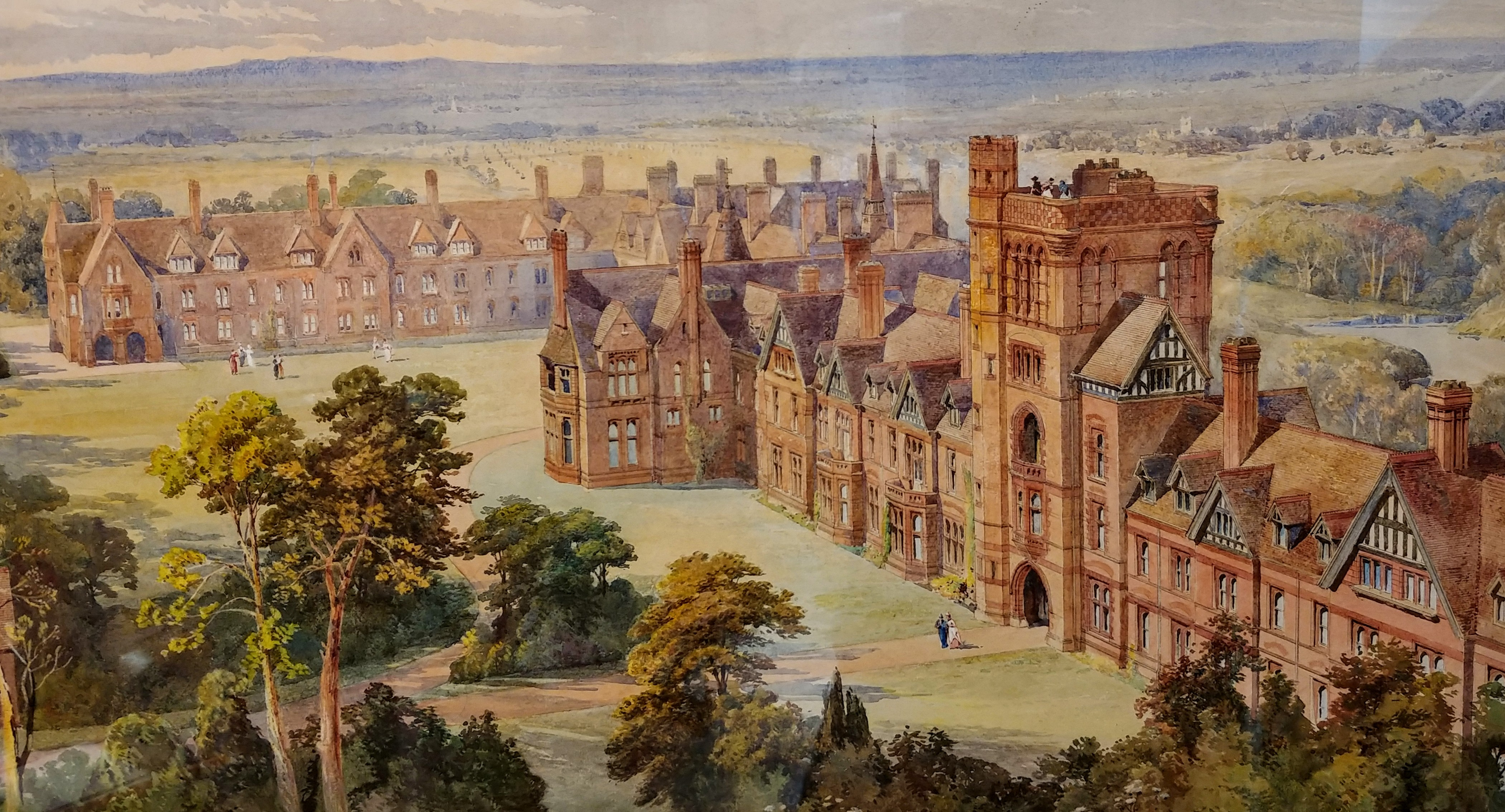
Watercolour by Alfred Waterhouse, architect of Girton

At that time, students had the option of doing a Pass degree, which consisted of "a disorderly collection of fragmented learning", or an Honours degree, which at that time meant the Mathematics Tripos, classics, and natural or moral sciences. An Honours degree was considered more challenging than the Pass degree. In 1869, Henry Sidgwick helped institute the Examinations for Women, which was designed to be of intermediate difficulty. This idea was heavily opposed by Emily Davies, as she demanded admittance to the Tripos examinations.

The college was established on 16 October 1869 under the name of the College for Women at Benslow House in Hitchin, Hertfordshire, which was considered to be a convenient distance from Cambridge and London. It was thought to be less "risky" and less controversial to locate the college away from Cambridge in the beginning. The college was one of England's first residential colleges for women. Whitelands College, now part of the University of Roehampton, was established as a college of higher education for women earlier, in 1841. They worked with Fanny Metcalfe to develop the curricula.

In July and October 1869, entrance examinations were held in London, to which 21 candidates came; 16 passed. The first term started on 16 October 1869, when five students began their studies: Emily Gibson, Anna Lloyd, Louisa Lumsden, Isabella Frances Townshend and Sarah Woodhead. Adelaide Manning was also registered as a student, although with the intention of staying for a single term, and her step-mother Charlotte Manning was the first Mistress.

The first three students to unofficially sit the Tripos exams in Lent term 1873, Rachel Cook and Lumsden, who both took the Classical Tripos, as well as Woodhead, who took the Mathematical Tripos, were known as "The Pioneers".

In 1871, through fundraising £7,000 was collected, which allowed for the purchase of land either at Hitchin or near Cambridge. By 1872, sixteen acres of land at the present site were acquired near the village of Girton. The college was then renamed Girton College, and opened at the new location in October 1873. The buildings had cost £12,000 to erect, and consisted of a single block which comprised the east half of Old Wing. At the time, thirteen students were admitted. In 1876, Old Wing was completed, and Taylor's Knob, the college laboratory and half of the Hospital Wing was built.

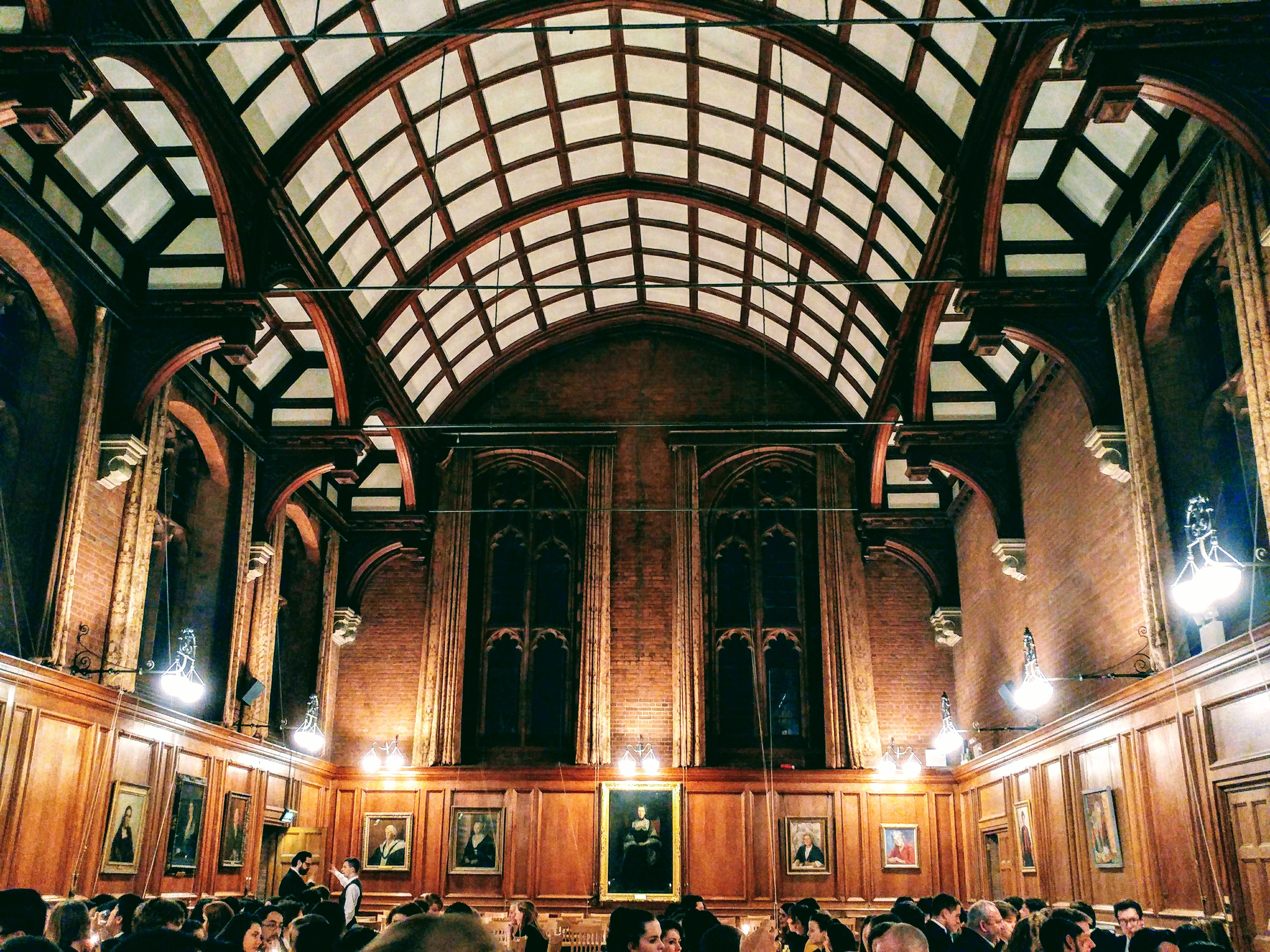
The Great Hall is of Victorian design featuring wood panelling and dominating arched windows

In the following year, Caroline Croom Robertson joined the management team as secretary to reduce the load on Emily Davies. In 1884, Hospital Wing was completed, and Orchard Wing, Stanley Library and the Old Kitchens added. At that time, Girton had 80 students. By 1902, Tower Wing, Chapel Wing and Woodlands Wing as well as the Chapel and the Hall were finished, which allowed the college to accommodate 180 students.

In 1921, a committee was appointed to draft a charter for the college. By summer 1923 the committee had completed the task, and on 21 August 1924 George V granted the charter to "the Mistress and Governors of Girton College" as a Body Corporate. Girton was not officially a college yet, nor were its members part of the University - Girton and Newnham were classed as "recognised institutions for the higher education for women".

On 27 April 1948, women were admitted to full membership of the University of Cambridge, and Girton College received the status of a college of the university.

=== 1976 to present: Pioneering for sexual equality ===
Social and cultural changes in the post-war period led to an increasing number of British universities to become co-educational. In Cambridge, Churchill College, King's College and Clare College were the first men's colleges to admit women in 1972. Girton had already amended its statutes in 1971 in such a way as to allow the admission of men, should the Governing Body vote in favour at an unspecified date in the future. The decision to become mixed came in November 1976, when the Governing Body voted to act upon the statute, which made Girton the first women's college to admit men.

In January 1977, the first two male Fellows, Frank Wilkinson and John Marks, arrived, followed by male graduate students in 1978, and, finally, undergraduates in October 1979. One reason for the change was that the first mixed colleges in Cambridge immediately shot to the top of the Tripos league tables, as they seemed to attract bright students, who preferred to stay in co-educational colleges. Girton became co-residential as well, which meant that male and female students shared the same facilities. Only one all-female corridor in which rooms were reserved exclusively for women remained. Upon the arrival of male undergraduates, JCR and MCR social facilities had to be enlarged. The college bar was opened in 1979 as well as rugby, cricket and soccer pitches provided from 1982 onwards.

In the 22-year period from 1997 to 2019, the Tompkins Table annual ranking of Cambridge colleges by undergraduate academic performance ranked Girton College an average of 20 out of the 29 colleges researched. In 2019, it came 20th, with 22 per cent of all undergraduate students gaining a first-class degree.

=== Mistresses ===
The mistress is the formal head of the college. Her main task is to exercise general superintendence over the college's affairs. She presides over the college council and several college committees. The mistress is elected by the council, and has to reside at the college precincts for at least two-thirds of each term, or 210 days of each academic year. Ever since the establishment of Girton College, the position has been held by a female, even though male candidates have had equal rights for running for the office since 1976 and would, if elected, be called by the female term "mistress".

The current mistress is Elisabeth Kendall, who in 2022 succeeded Susan J. Smith; she had held the position since 2009.

== Accommodation and fees ==
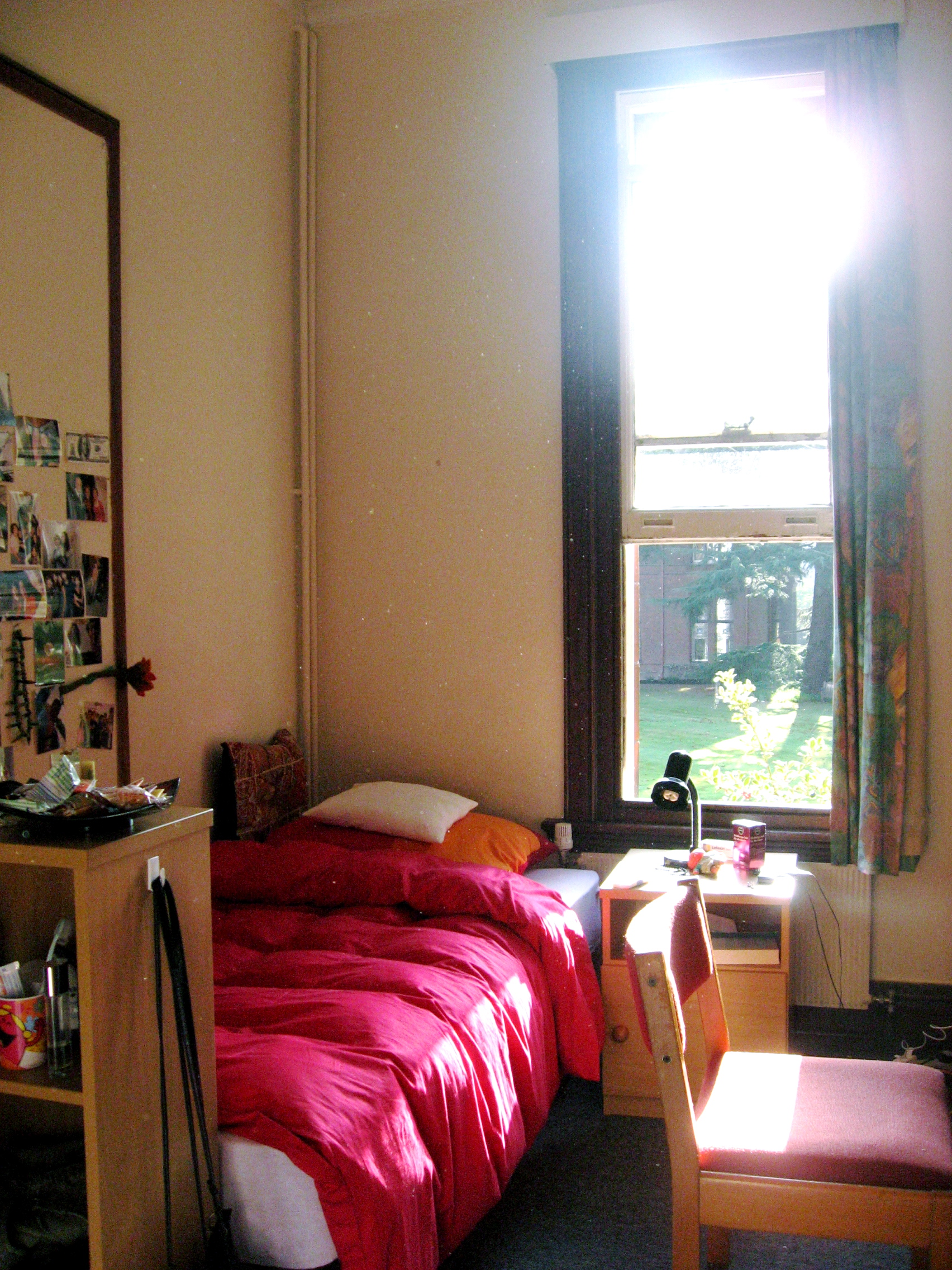
Undergraduate room (grade A) at college main site

As with many Cambridge colleges, rooms are available to external guests on a bed and breakfast basis.

=== Undergraduates ===
It is customary for Cambridge colleges to provide accommodation for the first three-year undergraduate students. Rooms in the main site are arranged along corridors, which makes it possible to walk from one location in the building to another without going outside. Some of the rooms were originally designed as sets by Alfred Waterhouse. The rooms range in several quality grades but are all charged at the same weekly rate. Girton, along with Newnham College, are the only colleges to charge the same fee for all undergraduate accommodation on their premises. The main site offers 348 rooms, rented for the entire year (38 or 39 weeks, depending on the term dates).

Every year, a ballot is organised by the JCR to determine room distribution. To first years, rooms are allocated randomly, with students allocated low grade rooms having first pick of rooms the following year. The college consults regularly with the JCR and MCR on its policy of charging equal rents for all non-en suite rooms. Most undergraduate students live on the main site, and second years have the option of living at Swirles Court.

In 2022, the college introduced a Residence Bursary scheme, whereby any student in receipt of a Cambridge Bursary receives a rent discount of £20 per week for all weeks of their tenancy; for these students the median rent is amongst the lowest of the Cambridge colleges.

=== Graduates and fellows ===
Since 2017, graduate students live in Swirles Court. One house on Huntingdon Road is used to accommodate research fellows. The Graduate Union specifically identified Girton as providing an insufficient amount of housing to married postgraduates, with no rooms available at Swirles Court for married students.

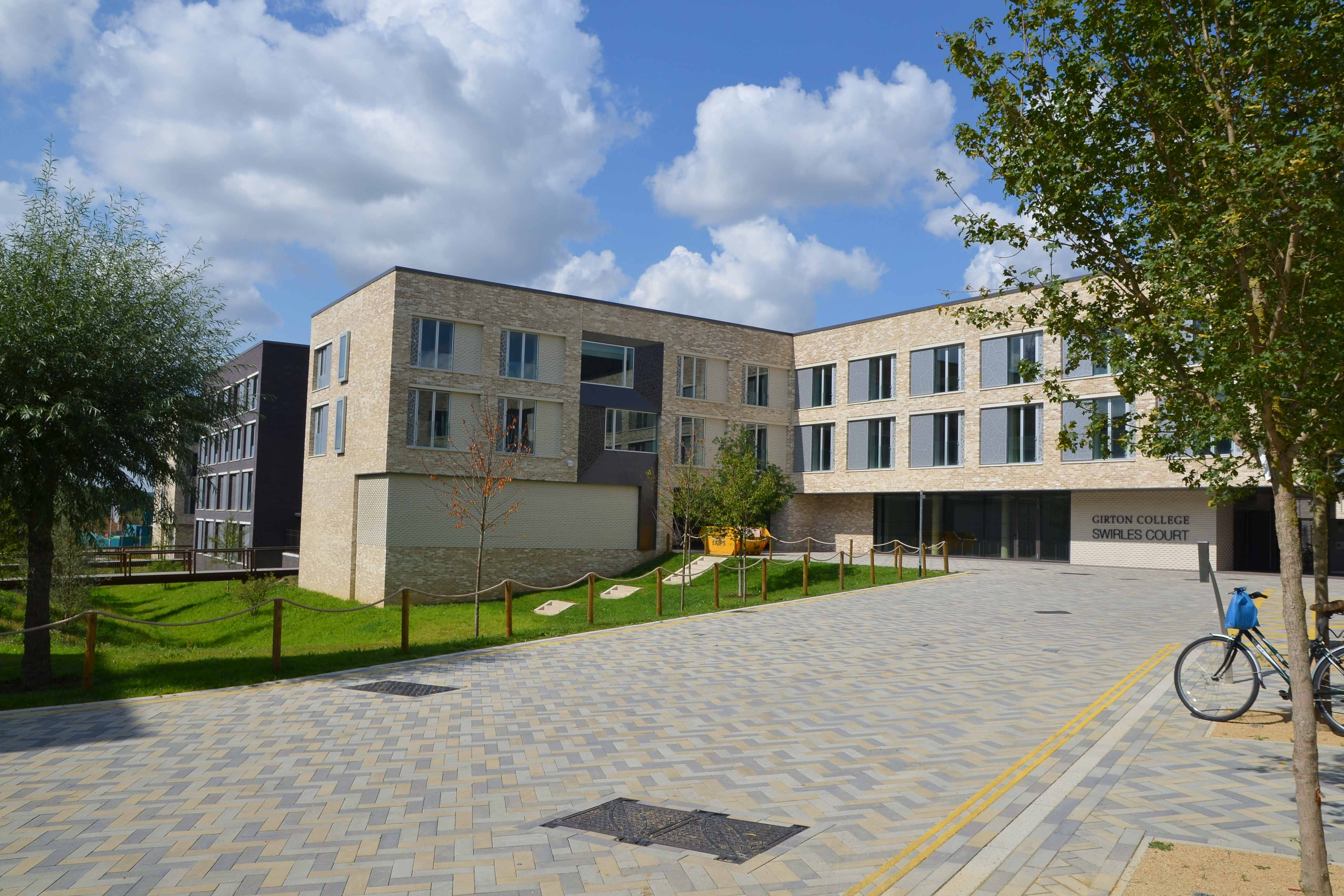
Swirles Court

==== Swirles Court ====
Swirles Court, part of the Eddington neighbourhood of the North West Cambridge development, opened in 2017. This accommodation annexe provides up to 325 ensuite single rooms for graduates and for second-year undergraduates and above.

It is named after Bertha Swirles (Lady Jeffreys), a Girton alumna. Swirles is open year-round to student living and has a college porter on staff 24/7, separate laundry facilities and a separate mailing address from the main college.

==== Wolfson Court ====
In 2017, Girton College moved the graduate accommodation from Wolfson Court (on Clarkson Road, near the city centre) to Swirles Court. Wolfson Court was an annexe to Girton College built on a 3-acre (1.2 ha) site. It was funded by the 1969 Centenary Appeal, and designed in 1971 by Cambridge architects David Wyn Roberts and Geoffrey Clarke. It had its own catering and accommodation facilities (106 single student rooms). Queen Elizabeth Court, which was linked to the main building and comprised two blocks of three linked houses (36 large single student rooms), was built for the purpose of graduate accommodation in 1992. It was frequently used as a location for conferences. The site also contained a nursery, operated by Bright Horizons. St John’s College acquired the site from Girton in 2018.

== Main site ==
=== Architecture ===
The initial and defining parts of the college were designed by Alfred Waterhouse: The architect built the main site with the Old Wing, the Hospital Wing, the Orchard Wing, the Stanley library and Old Kitchens between 1873 and 1886, as well as the parapetted gatehouse tower in 1886 and 1887. The red-brick design (English bond) is typical of Victorian architecture, and is enhanced by black mortar courses and terracotta details to the eaves, windows and doorways. The roofs are steeply pitched with crested tiles. In 1913, the site consisted of 33 acres (13 ha).

=== Library ===
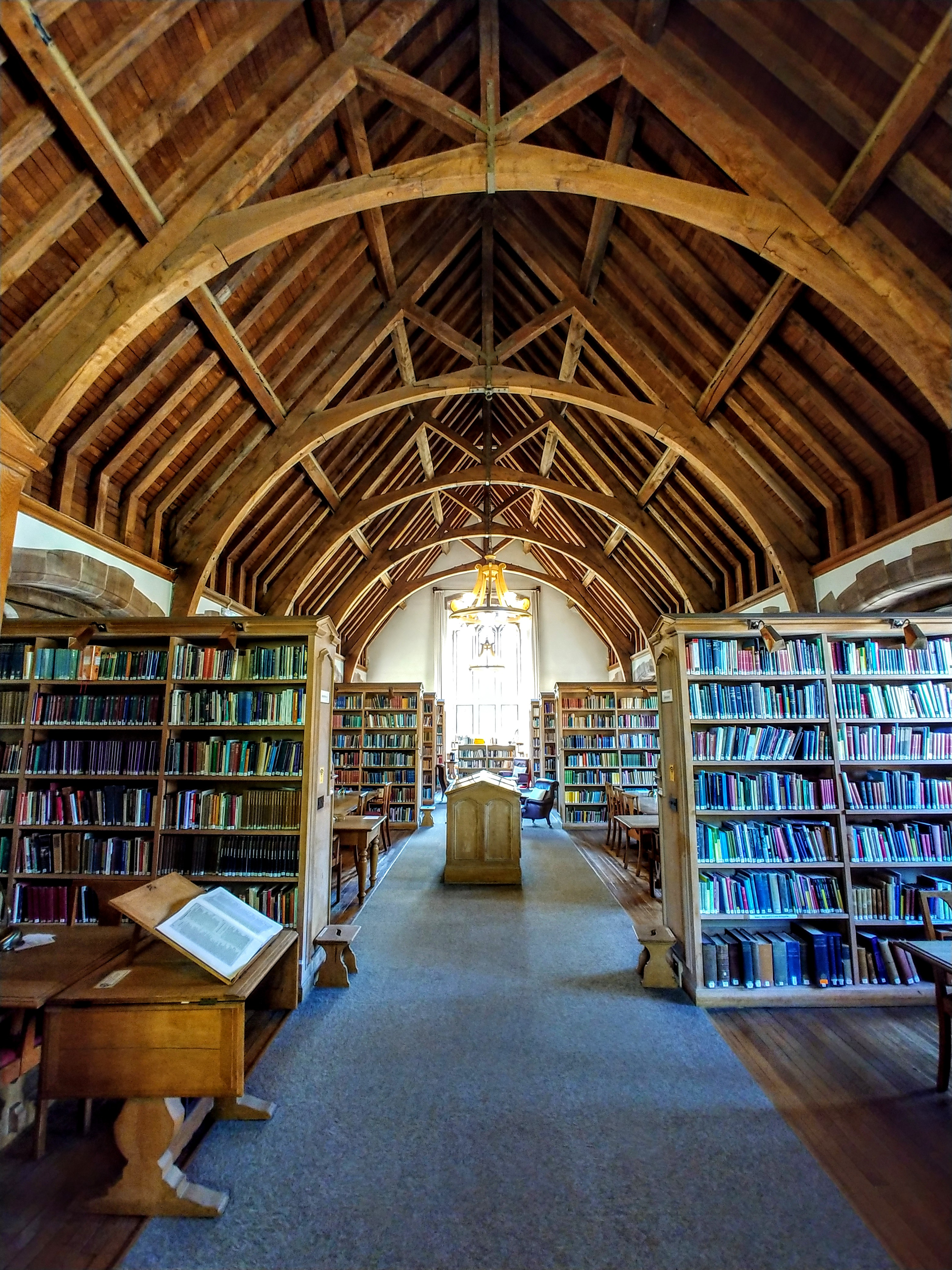
The College library's upper reading-room

Girton's first library, the Stanley library, was established in 1884 with a donation from Lady Stanley of Alderley. It was considered to be luxurious and comfortable, as it contained stained-glass windows, leather furniture and a large chimney. Books were acquired mostly through donations. By 1932 the collection had become so large that a new library was opened. Designed by Michael Waterhouse, descendant of the architects Paul Waterhouse and Alfred Waterhouse, the new library consisted of an upper reading room, crafted in oak, and a ground floor, in which the book collections are held. An annexe containing archives was added in 1967. The Duke building, a modern library extension offering IT facilities and a reading room, was opened in 2005. Named after Alison Duke, a fellow and major donor, the building was designed by Allies and Morrison. It won a RIBA National Award in 2006, a SCONUL Library Design Award in 2007, and a Civic Trust Award in 2007.

=== Chapel ===
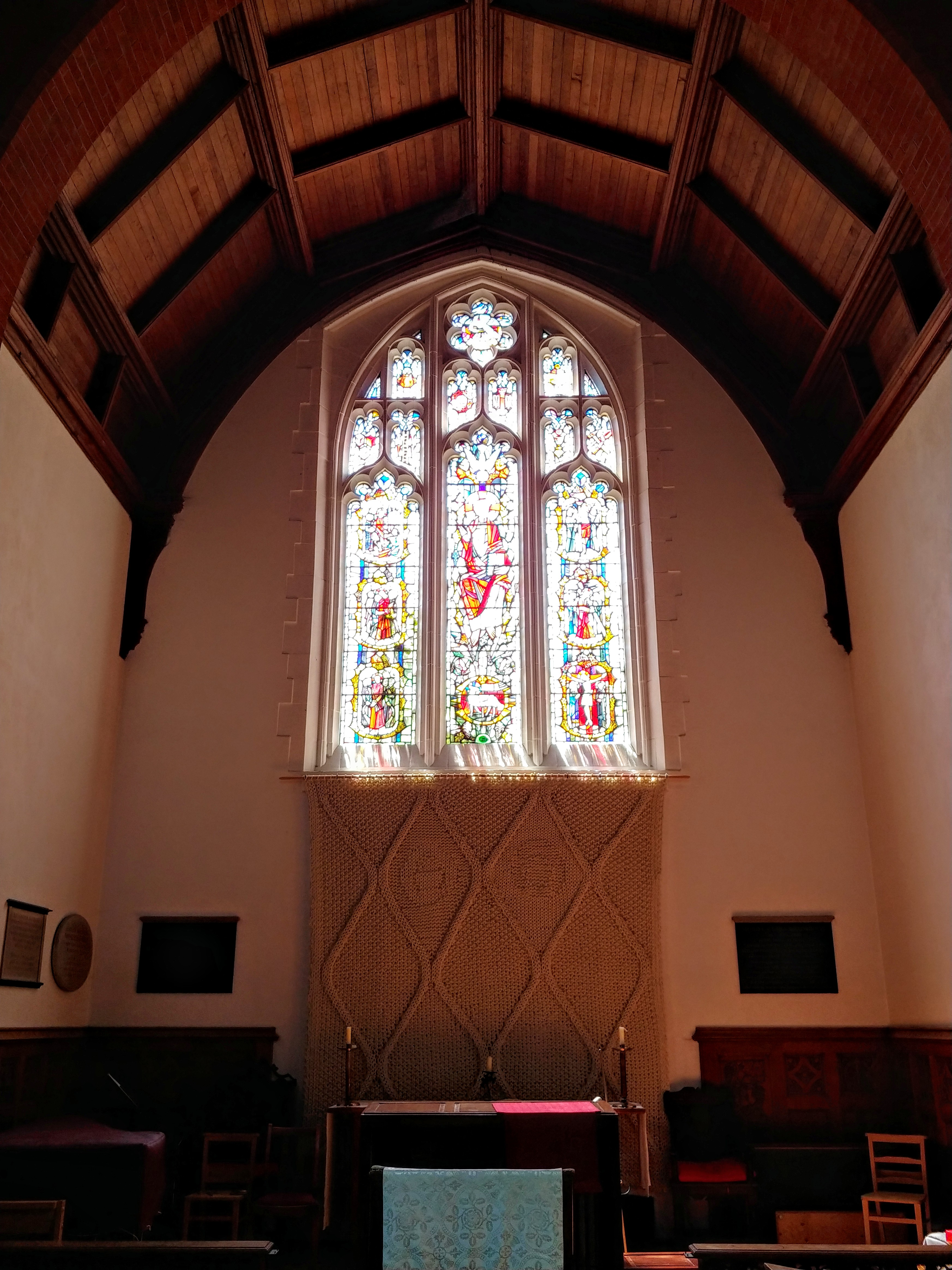
The chapel's south-facing window

Emily Davies first mooted plans for a chapel in Girton College in 1890; however, building only started in 1899, four years after the death of Henrietta Stanley, Baroness Stanley of Alderley, who had opposed the idea and instead favoured improving staff salaries and equipment. The chapel, which was designed by Alfred and Paul Waterhouse, was completed in 1901, and inaugurated on 23 May 1902. It seats about 200 people and the interior is held very simply with the exception of oak carvings at the Chancel end and on two long desks in front of the choir seats, which were crafted by the mathematician Margaret Meyer, along with students and friends of the college. In 1910 came a fine Harrison & Harrison organ, the purchase of which was made possible through donations from students and friends of the college. The organ was rebuilt in 1974 and can still be found in the college chapel. A second organ was acquired in 2002.

In 1952, the year of the Golden jubilee of the inauguration, a stained-glass window was erected. In the Girton Review, the college's official termly newsletter, from Michaelmas term 1955, a description of the glass window can be found:

The centre light depicts Our Lord in Majesty, as it were the culmination of the Tree of Jesse and in the form described in the book of Revelation. The Lamb who may alone open the book sealed with seven seals is shown at the foot of the light, while the descent of the Holy Spirit in the form of a dove is shown at its apex. The flowers and fruit in the centre light represent the Tree of Jesse. The two lights flanking that in the centre depict scenes from the Passion of Our Lord. On the left are the entry into Jerusalem, the Betrayal of Judas and the Ecce Homo: on the right, the Scourging, Christ bearing His Cross, the Crucifixion. The scenes are linked with a pattern of leaves. Palm is used for the Entry into Jerusalem, and among other plants represented are the Star of Bethlehem, the Passion Flower and the Thorn. The lowest medallion on the right, portraying the crucifixion, is darker than the others, suggesting the darkness that was over the land. The uppermost tracery light depicts the Pelican in her Piety, and the remaining tracery lights contain the symbols of the Passion; the betrayal money, Peter’s lantern, pillar and scourges, dice, ladder and nails, hammer and pincers, crown of thorns and chalice.

In the original statement of aims and scope for the "Proposed College for Women" in 1867, it was announced that religious services and instruction would be in accordance with the principles of the Church of England, but where conscientious objections were entertained, attendance would not be necessary. A modified version of this statement appears in the modern college statutes, where it reads that "services in the Chapel shall normally be held in accordance with the practice of the Church of England, but other religious services may also be held there." At the outset, Chapel was used for morning prayers, usually said by the Mistress, and for Sunday services, taken by clergy of various denominations. Today, at least two services are held on a weekly basis: Evensong on Sunday at 5:30pm, and Compline on Tuesday at 9:10pm. They are organised by the college's part-time chaplain, who is assisted by student chapel wardens. The Mistress holds general responsibility in regard to services in the chapel, which she partly delegates to the Chapel Committee. The current Chaplain is the Rev. Dr Tim Boniface, who is also a bye-fellow at Girton, and a jazz musician.

=== Gardens ===
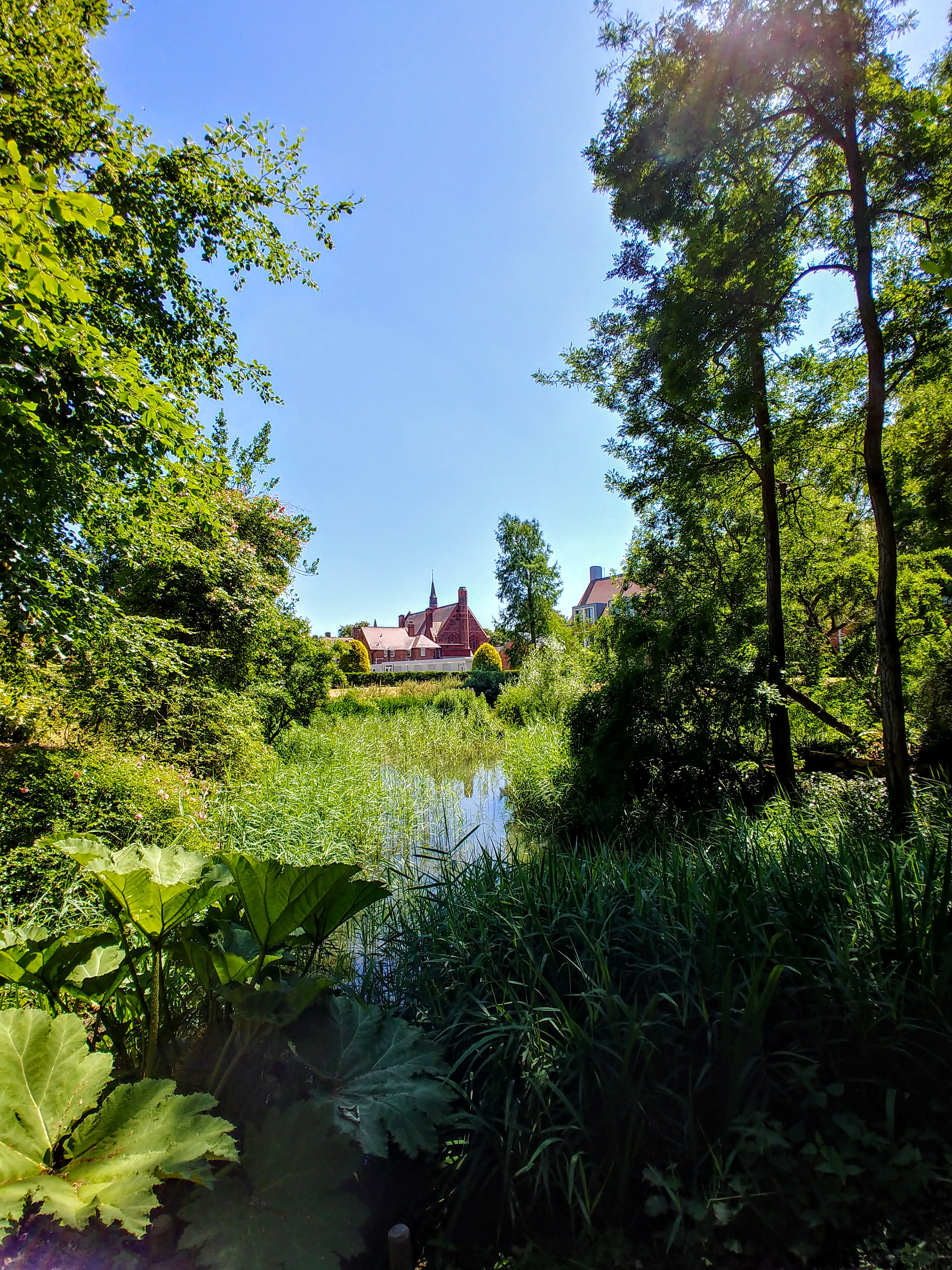
Girton's duck pond with the Great Hall in the background

When the land was bought, trees were planted on bare land. Today, the gardens of Girton are large compared to those of other Cambridge colleges. They became a preoccupation for the college in 1875 when Miss Davies handed over the responsibility for developing the gardens to Miss Bernard. A pond, which originated from excavations for the construction of the Stanley library and the Orchard Wing, dates from 1884. A 1983 report of the college ornithologists' society found sixty species of birds, and a moth report from 1986 recorded over 100 species. The Fellows' garden was redesigned in 1992 and hosts a green theatre. A rare breed of black squirrels can sometimes be seen in Girton.

=== Lawrence Room ===
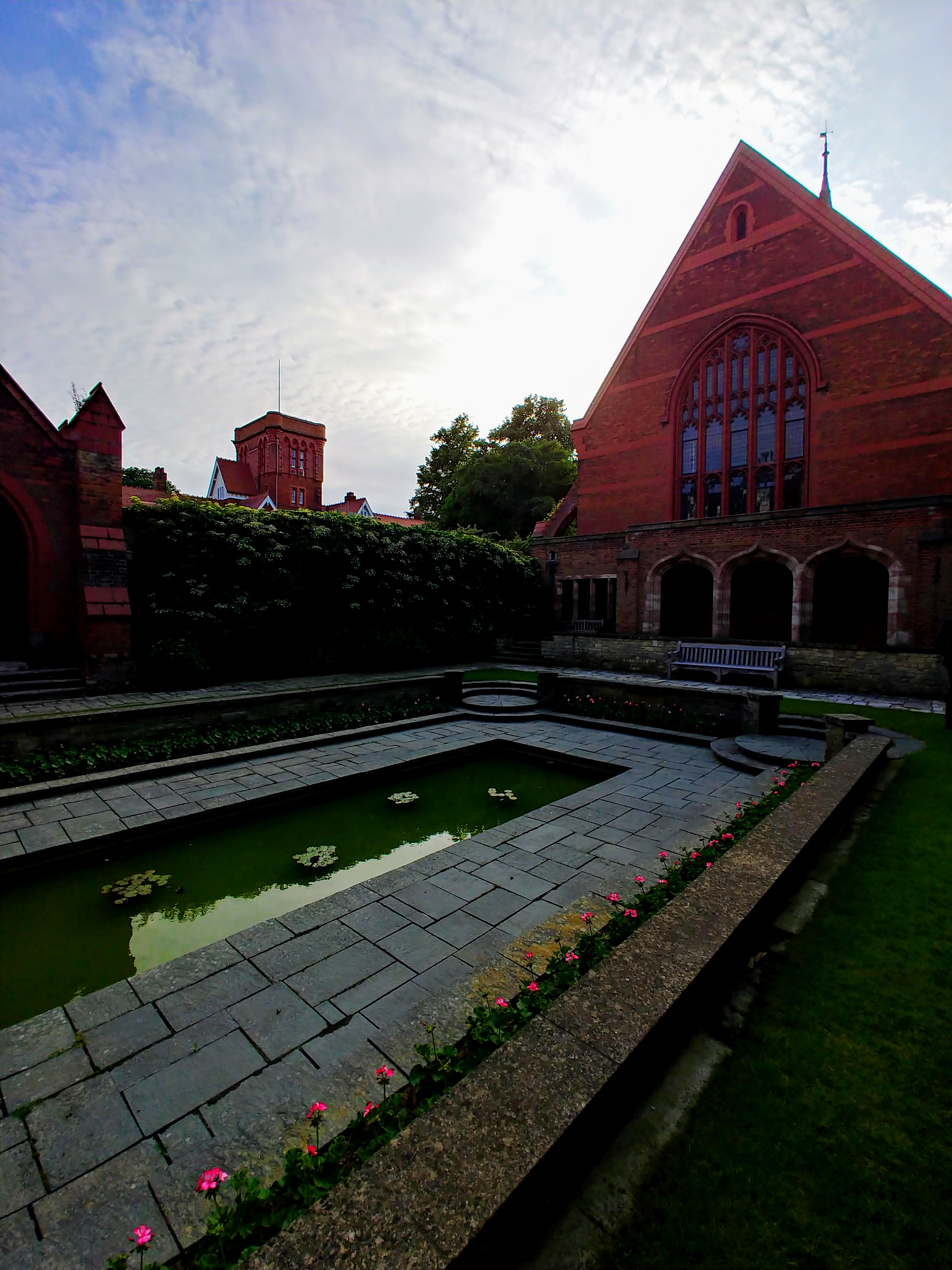
Eliza Baker Court

In 1934, the Lawrence Room on the college main site was dedicated to be the college museum. Named after Girton natural scientist Amy Lawrence, it houses an Anglo-Saxon, an Egyptian and a Mediterranean collection. Before the establishment of the Lawrence room in 1934, antiquities had been stored in and around the college library. Donations allowed for refurbishments in 1946, 1961, 1991 and 2008. In 2010/11, Lawrence room is opened once a week to visitors. The exhibitions are free of charge.

The Anglo-Saxon collection stems from excavations on the college main site made during construction work in 1881 and 1886, when an Anglo-Saxon cemetery, presumably from the fifth and sixth century AD, was discovered. Most findings, such as domestic utensils and personal items, were long held in the Museum of Archaeology and Anthropology in Cambridge. Some were only returned to the college as late as in 2008.

The highlight of the Egyptian collection consists of a portrait mummy bearing the inscription Hermionê Grammatikê (translation: "Hermione the literary lady" or "Hermione the language teacher"). It is one of the most widely reproduced and famous portrait mummies. Dating from the first century AD, it was discovered in the Roman cemetery of Hawara by the archeologist Flinders Petrie in 1911. "Hermione" is thought to be an 18- to 25-year-old girl from a wealthy background. Petrie and his wife Hilda wanted the mummy to go to a women's college due to its inscription. Funds were gathered, and in 1911 "Hermione" moved to Girton College, where she has remained since then. The Egyptian collection also holds four mummified baby crocodiles, which were thought to bring favour of Sobek, the ancient god of fertility and water. They were presented to the college by Alfred Waterhouse senior, the father of architect Alfred Waterhouse.

The Mediterranean collection offers both Classical and pre-Classical material. A collection of Greek Tanagra figurines, which date to the fourth and third century BC, form the most remarkable pieces of this collection.

=== People's Portraits ===
Since 2002, Girton has held the millennial exhibition of the Royal Society of Portrait Painters, entitled People's Portraits. The exhibition is open to the public.

The exhibition, aimed at showing and representing "ordinary" British people at the verge of the 21st century, toured Britain in 2000. Girton then won the bid to house the collection, to which new works are added annually. All pictures were created by, usually newly elected, members of the Royal Society of Portrait Painters,. The collection currently comprises 60 paintings, by artists including Anthony Morris, Daphne Todd, June Mendoza and Alastair Adams, the current president of the Society. The choice of Girton, one of the largest and thus most diverse colleges in Cambridge, to hold the collection is believed to reflect the college ethos of community and interest in art.

A reception was held on 11 May 2023 to celebrate the collection, with Dame Marina Warner invitied as guest speaker to give a speech at the reception.

=== Social spaces ===
Girton's Social Hub, nicknamed "Schlub" by the students, acts as both a café for students during the day and a bar in the evenings. Handmade paninis and pizzas are available during the day and pints as cheap as £2.70 are available during the day. Girton's cellar bar, nicknamed "Deep Schlub" by students, contains a pool table, booths and a social space for students to socialise in the evenings to take a break from their demanding work schedule. The "Deep Schlub" also hosts college "bops" organised by the JCR committee (college student council). The "Deep Schlub" was reopened in 2023 after renovation, and is now a fully stocked bar with its own pool table.

=== Proposed new buildings on main site ===
Following an initial masterplan submission in 2016 and resubmission in 2022, an outline planning application to construct new residential accommodation, ancillary meeting space, an auditorium and relocated sports facilities was approved by South Cambridgeshire District Council in June 2023. New buildings would provide 405 rooms for student accommodation mostly to allow for relocation from Swirles Court along with long-term planned growth of postgraduates.

== Student life ==
=== Formal halls ===
Among all Cambridge colleges, Girton and King's have the fewest formal halls, at only once per week. Formal halls typically accommodate around 160 students and guests, with tickets costing £14 and £19 respectively, as of 2024.

=== Sport teams ===
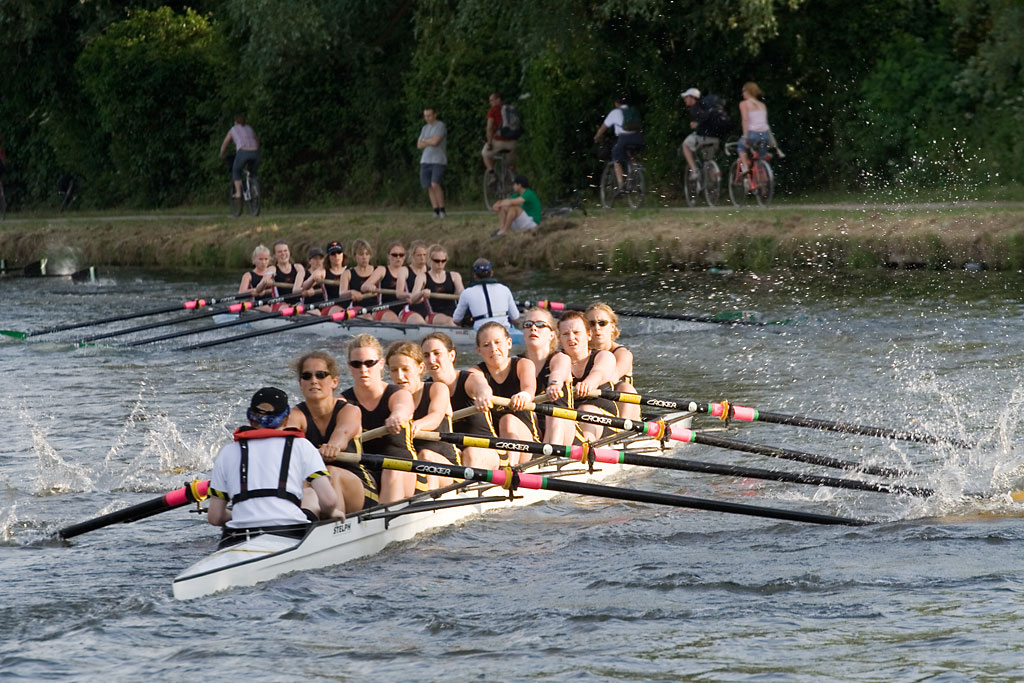
Girton College Boat Club take part in the May Bumps

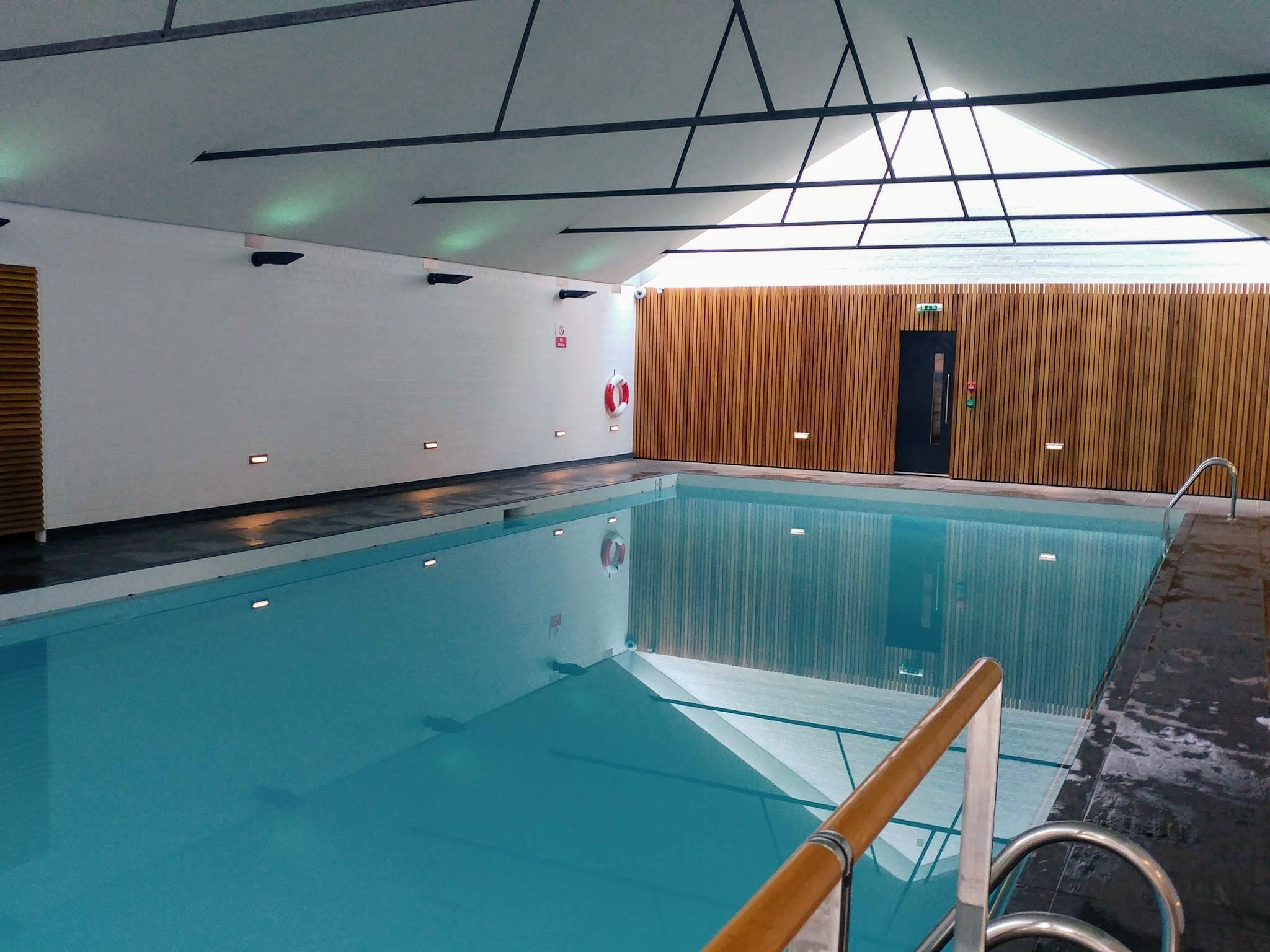
Girton is the only Cambridge college with an indoor heated swimming-pool. It is Grade II-listed.

Girton College has a variety of student-run sports teams and it provides its own sports pitches for cricket, football, hockey, netball and volleyball. The Girton College "Cloud Leopards" (founded in 2011) are the college lacrosse division one team, hosting meetings against Girton's sister college in Oxford. An extensive refurbishment of the pitches was completed in 2009. There are men's and women's teams for badminton, football, hockey, rowing (Girton College Boat Club) and rugby. Hockey has a mixed team as well. Cricket, cross country, lacrosse, netball, squash, swimming, table tennis, tennis, volleyball and waterpolo teams are open to both male and female participants. The college has outdoor tennis and indoor squash courts, and a gym. The indoor-heated swimming pool has been in use since 1900. A one-mile (1.6 km) running path leads around the college. A new sports pavilion, the John Marks Pavilion, was opened in 2013.

In 1995 the men's football team won Cuppers for the first time and in 1997–98 they followed this up by winning their first League Championship. In 2003–04, Girton won the League Championship for a second time.

=== Music ===
The college has a strong history of music, which is supported by the university's Chairman of the Faculty Board of Music, also Director of Studies in Music at Girton. In the last decade, the college has consistently been within the top three colleges for music in the university. In 2005, the highest ever first-class honours in the music Tripos was attained by a Girtonian. The student-run and fellow-led Girton College Music Society hosts weekly concerts in term time, as well as termly orchestral concerts. The college provides four practice grand pianos (including a Steinway Model B), a double-manual harpsichord and two organs. Moreover, all undergraduate music students are provided with a practice piano in their room for the duration of their course. The chapel's organ is a four-manual, crafted by the Swiss firm St. Martin and acquired in 2002.

The chapel choir has 28 members and sings Choral Evensong (Sunday) and Compline (Tuesday) in the college chapel every week. The choir has released eight CDs. Girton grants two undergraduate organ scholarships for £300 per annum, choral scholarships for £100 per annum each, and choral exhibitions.

=== Societies ===
Admitting undergraduate students studying all subjects except for the History of Art and Education Triposes, the college hosts a variety of student-run societies which cater for a wide range of interests. Many subjects have their own societies including Natural History, History, Economics (Joan Robinson society), Geography, Music, Medicine, MML and Law. There is furthermore the Art society, the Film society and the Girton Amateur Dramatic Society (GADS) which produces around two plays per term. Finally, Girton Amnesty and the Orchestra on the Hill serve students with specific interest in human rights and music, respectively.

=== Spring Ball ===
Girton Spring Ball is understood to have evolved from a traditional dance, the earliest record of which dates to 1883; it was only in the mid-1900s that the Ball began to resemble its contemporary form, notably in 1969 when the College celebrated its centenary anniversary. Currently, the Ball is usually held annually on the Friday after the end of Lent term, contrasting with most other Cambridge Colleges who host May Balls. It is organised by a committee of around 20 current Girton students. More recent Girton Balls have become larger than their earlier counterparts and the majority of the College site is now included in the Ball area.

The 2016 Spring Ball received widespread media attention when it was cancelled by Girton College Council following the death of a student at the college.

== Notable alumni and fellows ==
The college is home to an interdisciplinary group of critical social scientists. It also has a tradition in heterodox economics, spearheaded by Joan Robinson.

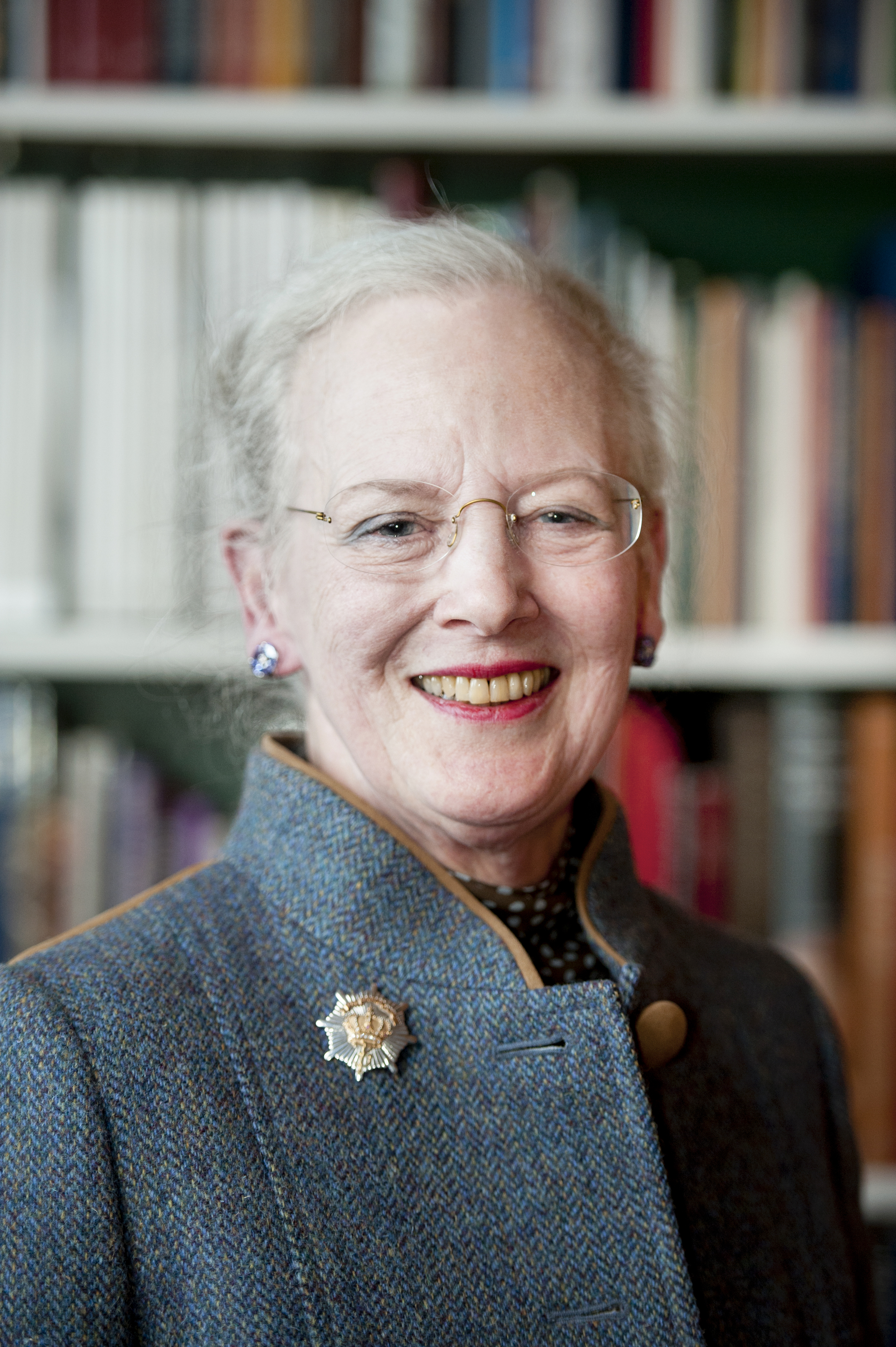
Margrethe II, former Queen of Denmark

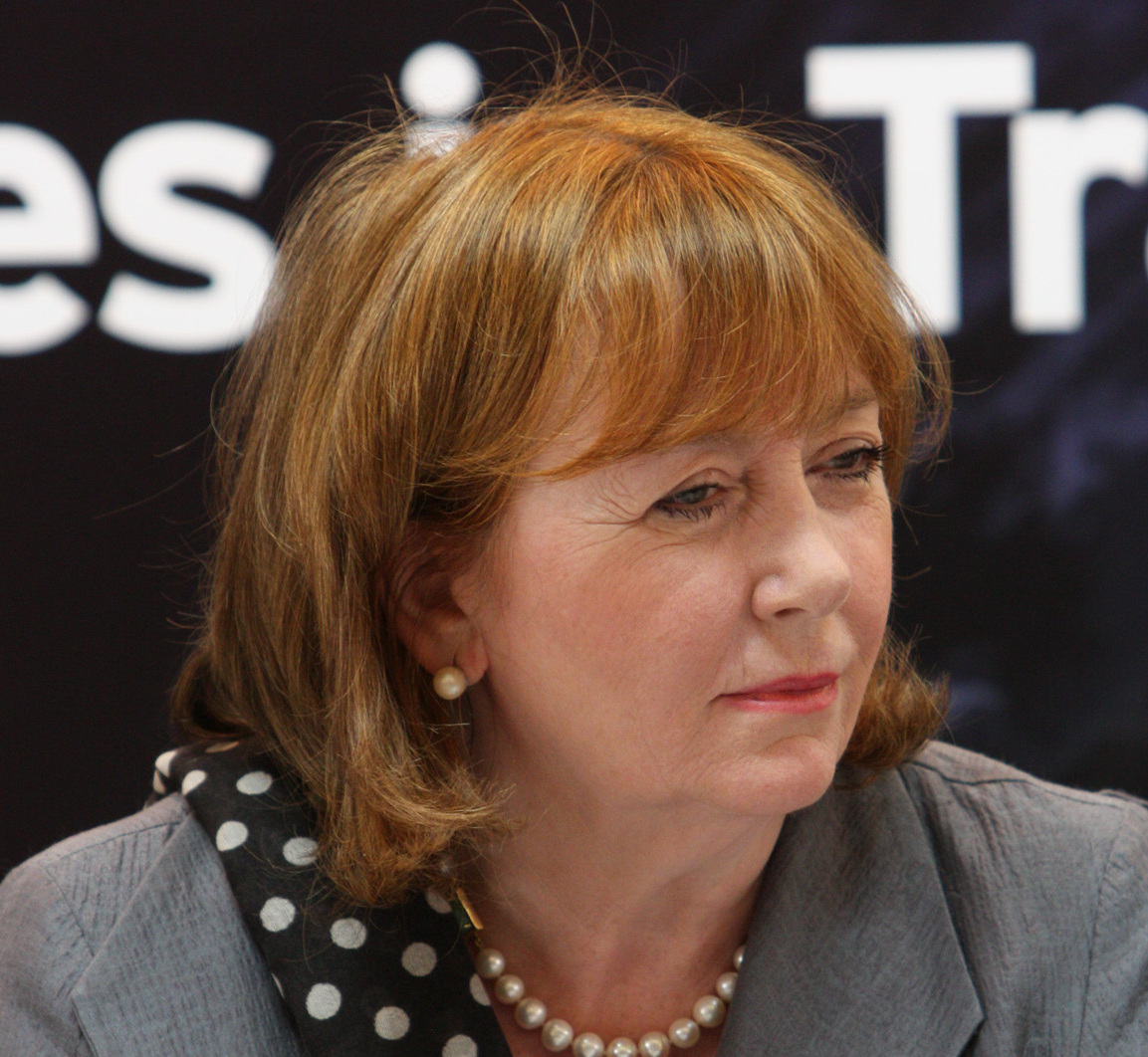
Elizabeth Symons, Baroness Symons of Vernham Dean, British peer

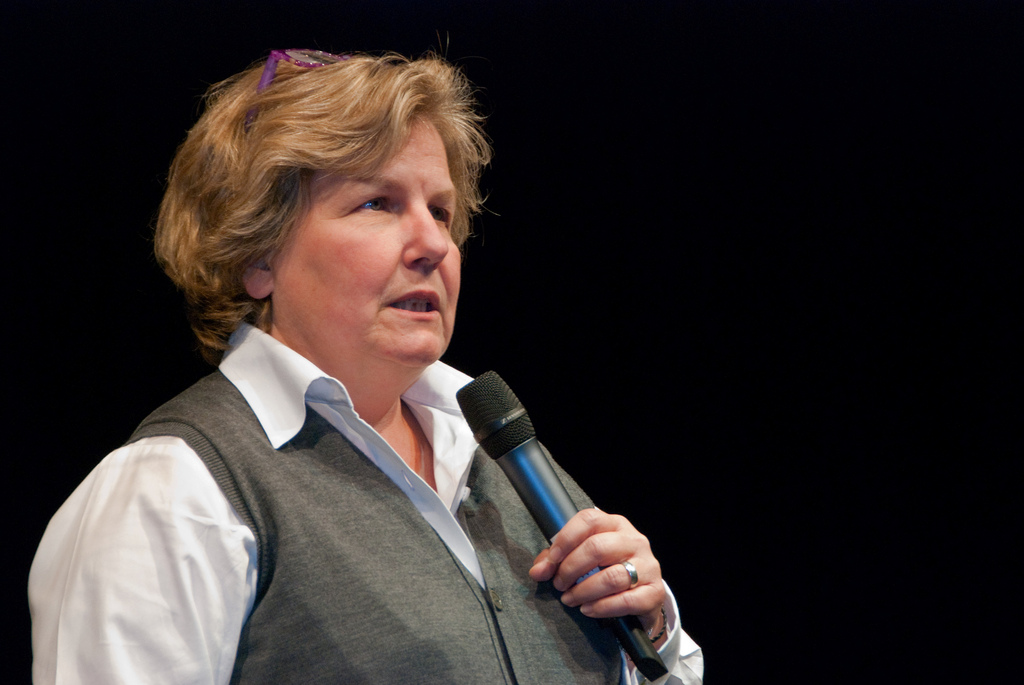
Sandi Toksvig, comedian and author

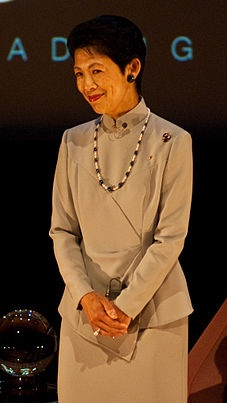
Hisako, Princess Takamado, member of the Japanese Imperial Family

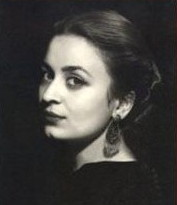
Dina bint Abdul-Hamid, former Queen consort of Jordan

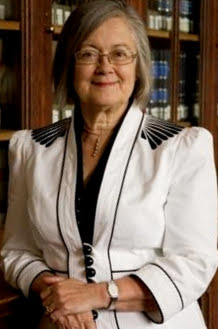
Brenda Hale, Baroness Hale of Richmond, former President of the Supreme Court of the United Kingdom

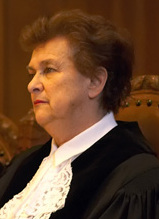
Rosalyn Higgins, Lady Higgins, former President of the International Court of Justice

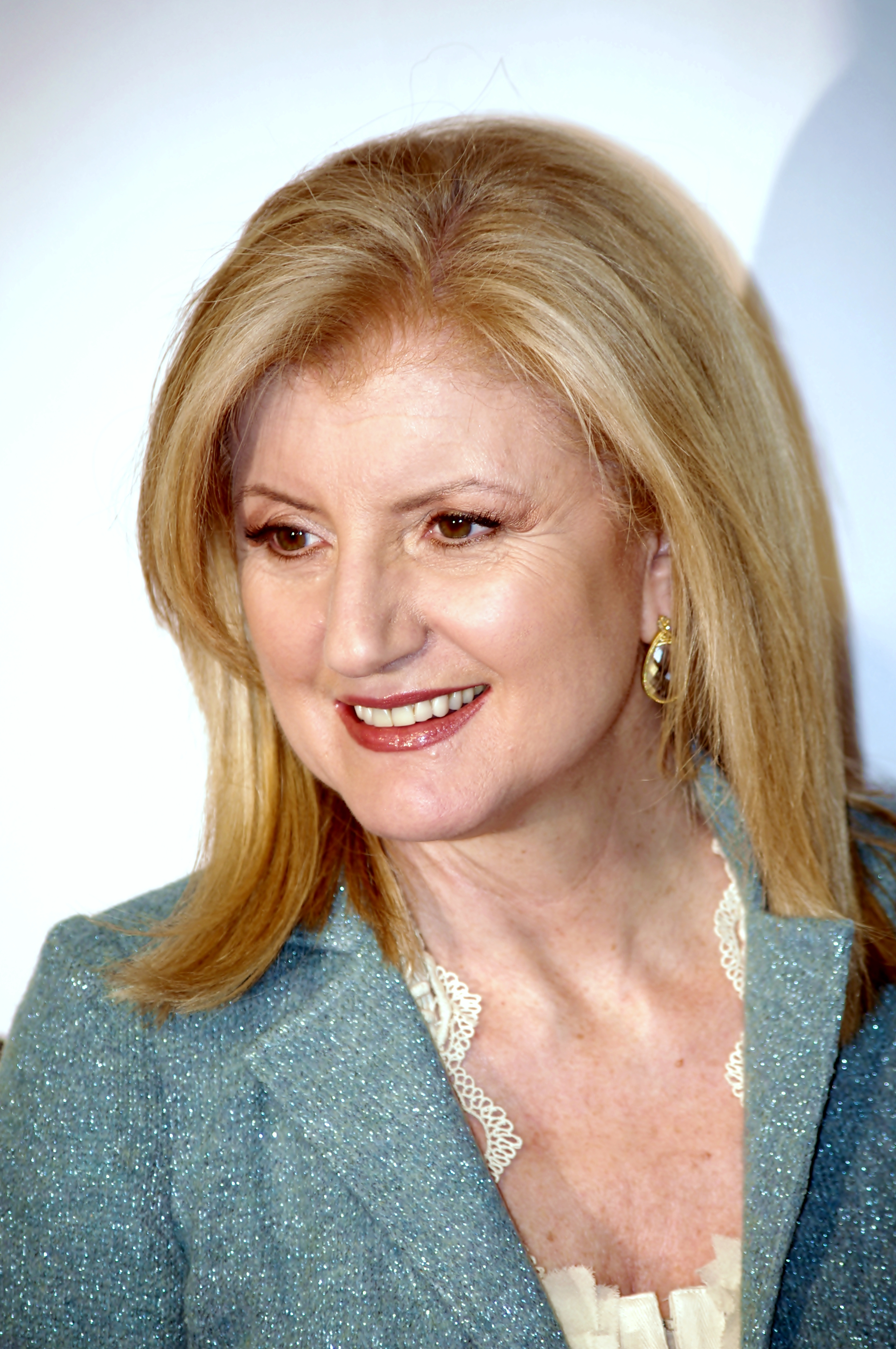
Arianna Huffington, co-founder and editor-in-chief of the Huffington Post

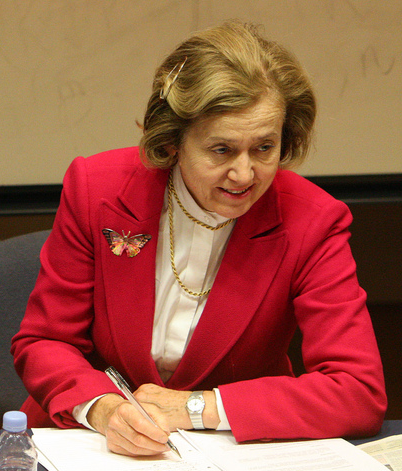
Mary Arden, Lady Arden of Heswall, former Justice of the Supreme Court of the United Kingdom

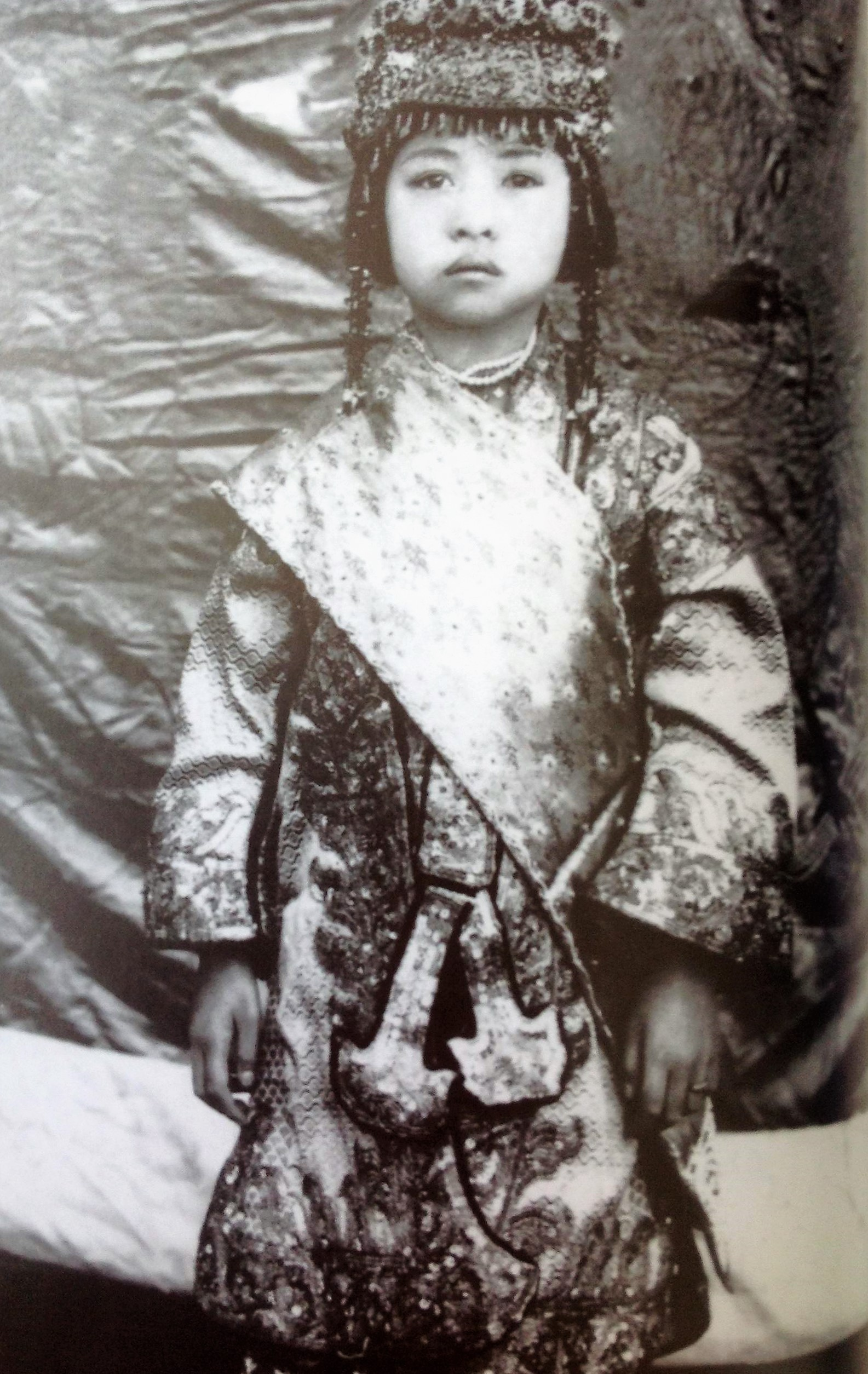
Sao Sanda, the Princess of Yawnghwe

== Symbolism ==
=== Arms ===
Girton arms representing the four major benefactors

The college applied for a coat-of-arms derived from the arms of its founders and benefactors: H. R. Tomkinson, Madame Bodichon (née Leigh Smith), Henrietta Stanley, Baroness Stanley of Alderley (daughter of the 13th Viscount Dillon), and Emily Davies who did not have arms and was instead represented by the Welsh colours, vert and argent. Edward Earle Dorling submitted a variety of designs to the council, however the task was not easy. "A patch-work of elaborate charges and many colours was to be avoided. Mr Tomkinson's fascinating martlets and Lady Stanley's lion had to be abandoned with regret, as was also a design of green and silver chequers which would have given more prominence to Miss Davies."

Finally, in 1928 the design was accepted by all and the college was granted the following:

We … grant and assign unto The Mistress and Governors of Girton College the Arms following that is to say: Quarterly Vert and Argent a cross flory countercharged a Roundel Ermine and in the second and third quarters a Crescent Gules, … to be borne and used for ever, hereafter by the Mistress and Governors of Girton College and by their Successors upon Seals Shields or otherwise according to the Laws of Arms.

=== Gown ===
The college gown has the standard pattern of an undergraduate gown at the University of Cambridge, with the sleeves sewn up for a length of eight inches from the shoulder. The proper dress of the gown and cap was observed at the first honorary degree to a woman, given to the Queen, an LL.D. on 21 October 1948. As academic dress, gowns were adopted with little changes (the sleeves had to be closed so that even in the summer, when women wear short-sleeved dresses their bare shoulders do not show), and square caps were chosen as head-dress. However, to remember the time when women were not allowed to obtain degrees of the University of Cambridge, no gowns are worn during the college feast, when students in their final year are celebrated.

=== Grace ===
Girton College has a traditional two-word grace and a more recent full grace, both in Latin. On regular formal occasions, such as formal halls, the two-word graces are spoken, Benedictus benedicat (May the blessed one give blessing) at the start of the meal, and Benedictus benedicatur (May praise be given to the blessed one) at the end of the meal. There is evidence that the two-word grace was used in 1926, and it is thought the two-word grace was used from the foundation of the college onwards.

The words and the music of the full grace were composed in 1950 by Alison Duke and Jill Vlasto respectively. The grace came after the admission of women to full membership of the university so as to bring Girton in line with the other colleges. It is used on the most formal occasions, such as the Foundation Dinner, and it is sung once a year at the College Feast, which all final year students attend.

Full grace (in Latin):

Benedic Domine, nobis et omnibus huius collegii alumnis,
donisque tuis quae de munificentia tua sumus iam sumpturi;
et illis salubriter nutriti debitas tibi gratias pie reddamus.
Custodi, quaesumus, Domine, filios et filias
et consule necessitatibus animarum et corporum,
hoc ipso momento et in aeternum.

Translation:

Bless us, O Lord, and all members of this college,
and also thy gifts, which of thy bounty we are about to receive;
and having been wholesomely nourished by the same, let us dutifully render to thee the thanks that are owed.
Protect, we beseech thee, O Lord, thy sons and daughters and provide for the needs both of our souls and bodies,
at this present time and for evermore.

=== Songs ===
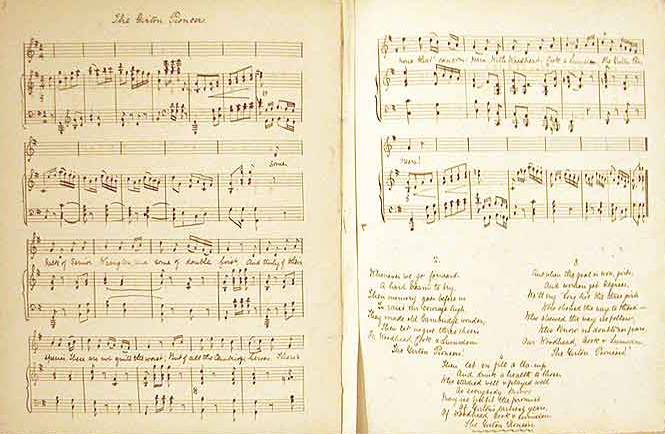
"The Girton Pioneers" (tune of "The British Grenadiers") honours the first three women to sit the Tripos exams

The oldest college song, "The Girton Pioneers", was composed by several students in Hitchin in 1873. Its purpose was to celebrate the first three students who sat the Tripos examinations in 1871. It is sung with the tune of "The British Grenadiers". This is the first stanza:

Some talk of Senior Wranglers,
And some of Double Firsts,
And truly of their species
These are not the worst;
But of all the Cambridge heroes
There’s none that can compare
With Woodhead, Cook and Lumsden,
The Girton Pioneers.

== See also ==
- Girton College Boat Club
- Category:Alumni of Girton College, Cambridge
- Category:Fellows of Girton College, Cambridge

=== Eponymous institutions ===
- Girton Grammar School, Bendigo, Victoria, Australia
- Girton Hall, University of California, Berkeley
