= Isabella Frances Townshend =

Anglo-Irish artist (1847–1882)

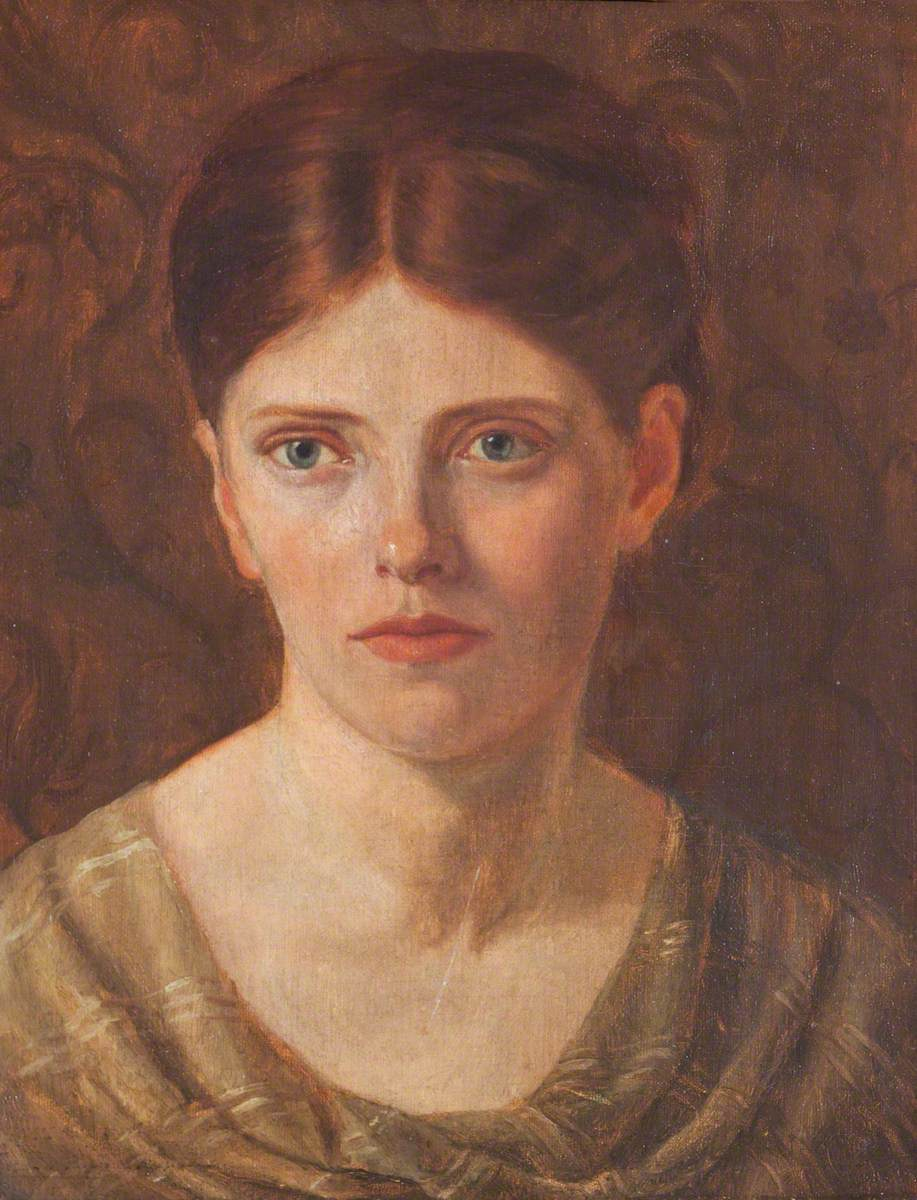
- Isabella Frances Vere Townshend (Self Portrait)
- Born: Isabella Frances Vere Townshend; 1 November 1847; Rosscarbery, County Cork, Ireland
- Died: 20 July 1882 (aged 34); Ealing, Middlesex, UKGBI
- Resting place: St Mary's Perivale
- Education: Hitchin College (didn't graduate)
- Relatives: Emily Townshend (sister-in-law); Caroline Townshend (niece)

Isabella Frances Townshend (1847-1882) was an Anglo-Irish artist, and one of the first five students at Hitchin College (present-day Girton College, Cambridge).

== Early life ==
Isabella Frances Vere Townshend was born on 1 November 1847 in Rosscarbery, County Cork to Rev Chambré (Note: Alternatively spelt Chambrey) Corker Townshend and Eliza Wilmot Townshend (née Oliver). Her father died in 1852.

In 1869, Townshend was one of five women to enrol at Hitchin College. She left the college in 1872 without obtaining a qualification. By 1874, along with a Mrs Hartley Brown, Townshend had an interior deign business on Bulstrode Street, Marylebone, London. In the early 1880s, she travelled to Italy to study painting.

== Death and family ==
Townshend died on 20 July 1882 in Ealing, Middlesex (present-day London) aged 34, possibly of typhoid that she contracted in Italy. On 25 July 1882 Townshend was buried at St Mary's Perivale.

Through her brother Chambré Corker Townshend, she was the sister-in-law of Emily Townshend, a social reformer, suffragette and fellow-student at Hitchin College, and the aunt of the artist Caroline Townshend.

In her memoir, Emily Townshend recalls that Townshend "had a great influence on my views of life and on my life altogether. She was about a year older that myself, small and plain. She had considerable ability, indeed, many of us gave her credit for a touch of genius, yet she never accomplished much definite work of any kind."
