= Joan Howson =

British artist

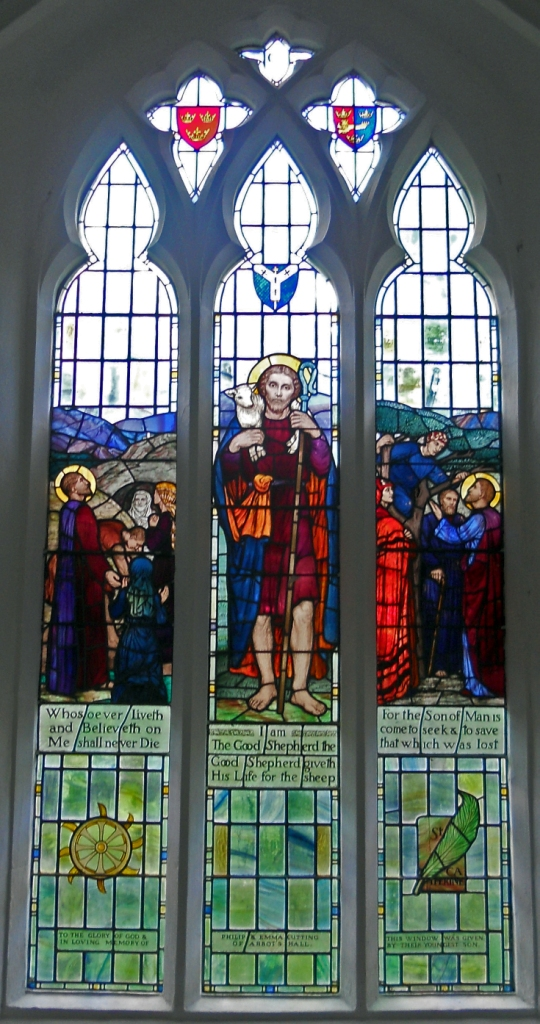
- Stained glass window, Pettaugh, Suffolk by Caroline Townshend and Joan Howson
- Born: 9 May 1885; Flintshire, Wales
- Died: 1964 (aged 78–79)
- Education: Liverpool School of Art
- Known for: Stained glass

Joan Howson (1885–1964) was a British stained glass artist of the Arts and Crafts movement. She trained at the Liverpool School of Art before becoming a student and apprentice to Caroline Townshend. They later developed a lifelong partnership creating stained glass works under the name of their company, Townshend and Howson.

== Personal life ==
Howson was born on 9 May 1885 in Flintshire to Ethel and George John Howson. George had attended Trinity College, Cambridge and was in later life an archdeacon. Ethel Dealtry's father was vicar of Maidstone, where George was curate. Joan had four older brothers, one of whom died in infancy. Her brother George served in the First World War and later became chairman of the Royal British Legion's Poppy Factory.

She was involved in the woman's suffragette movement and socialism.

== Biography ==
Howson trained at the Liverpool School of Art from 1909 to 1912. She also studied music in Paris. After completing her training at Liverpool, she met Caroline Townshend at The Glass House studios in London. Howson became a student and apprentice to Townshend in 1912.

During World War I, Howson worked in a hospital laundry and later joined a Quaker group working in northern France.

In 1920, she and Caroline Townshend began their partnership, Townshend & Howson, under which they obtained commissions; they signed their works joining both of their initials. They moved to 61 Deodar Road in Putney which they had converted to house a studio and workshop, which was shared by fellow stained glass artist M. E. Aldrich Rope. They were neighbours to Edward Woore and other stained glass artists.

During the Second World War, with Townsend and Rope, she cared for evacuee children at three hospitals in North Wales. Townshend died in 1944. Howson returned to Putney and resumed her work there, often restoring medieval glass. She maintained both her late partner's initials and name in the company business. Two of her notable commissions were for Oxford University with the Department of Medieval Art, and a commission for the Church of St Mary Magdalene in Newark-on-Trent to restore stained glass from the 14th century.

The Archdeacon of Suffolk had donated a box of medieval glass fragments from Combs church, Suffolk, the result of an 1871 explosion, to the Victoria and Albert Museum. Howson was given the fragments to reassemble in 1939 and carried out the work without charge. During World War II, the box of glass was taken to safety in a mine at Portmadoc, North Wales. After the war, she received the retrieved fragments but it would be several years before she resumed work on the project, which she completed in 1952; the results were installed in the southeast windows of the church. Meanwhile, an important restoration commission was for Westminster Abbey, to restore Chapter House windows damaged during the war; she worked on this with Mary Eily de Putron, Leonard Banks, George Braggs, Nancy Collins, Bernardine Kellam Harris, Thomas Merritt, Eric Szabo and Percy Whale.

== Gallery ==
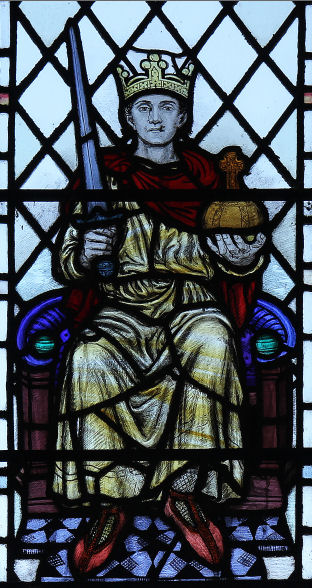
Stained glass in St Nectan's Church, Stoke Hartland, Devon

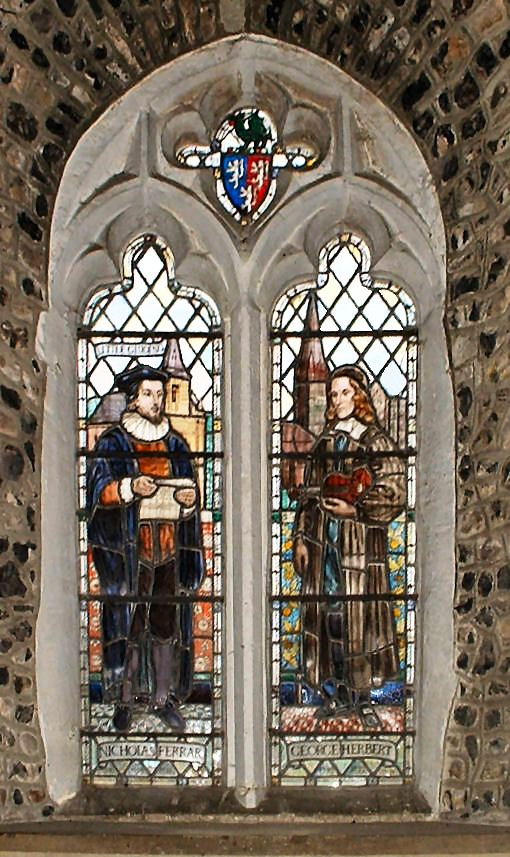
The Church of St Andrew, Bemerton, is known as George Herbert's Church. Townshend and Howson were responsible for the window's design and execution.
