= Emily Townshend =

British social reformer

- Born: Emily Caroline Gibson; 1849
- Died: 1934 (aged 84–85)
- Education: Hitchin College (didn't graduate)
- Occupations: Social reformer; suffragette
- Organisation: Fabian Society
- Spouse: Chambré Corker Townshend
- Children: 5 including, Caroline Townshend
- Relatives: Isabella Frances Townshend (sister-in-law)

Emily Caroline Townshend (née Gibson; 1849 – 1934) was a British social reformer and suffragette. Townshend was one of the first five students at Hitchin College (present-day Girton College, Cambridge).

== Early life and education ==
Emily Gibson was born in 1849. In 1869, Townshend was one of five women to enroll at Hitchin College, of which she was the first applicant. Townshend studied there from 1869 to 1872, and while there met her husband, Chambré Corker Townshend, through his sister and fellow student, Isabella Frances Townshend. Townshend left Hitchin College without obtaining a qualification.

== Social reform and activism ==
Emily Townshend joined the Fabian Society in 1894, becoming active in its Research Department and writing several tracts for the group. She also served a term on its executive in 1915/16. Townshend spent two years as editor of the School Child journal, and was also active on the Walham Green Juvenile Advisory Committee.

In 1907, age 57, Townshend spent two weeks in Holloway Prison for her part in a suffragette protest. In 1909, her daughter Rachel Townsend spent two months imprisoned there for similar activities.

Her daughter Caroline Townshend (1878–1944) was a leading stained glass artist and followed her mother in membership of the Fabian Society and interest in women's suffrage.

== Legacy ==
In November 1979 the historian, Brian Harrison, interviewed Townshend’s granddaughter, Mrs Joan Radice (née Keeling), as part of the Suffrage Interviews project, titled Oral evidence on the suffragette and suffragist movements: the Brian Harrison interviews. Joan talked about Emily’s career, household arrangements, relationship with her daughter Rachel and with the suffrage movement. Joan was the daughter of Emily’s daughter Rachel, who married social reformer Frederic Keeling (known as Ben) in 1909. Although the couple later divorced, Keeling kept in touch with his former mother in law. After Frederic’s death in the trenches of the First World War in 1916, Townshend edited and published his letters in a 1918 volume titled Keeling Letters & Recollections, with a foreword by H. G. Wells.
