= Caroline Townshend =

British stained glass artist (1878–1944)

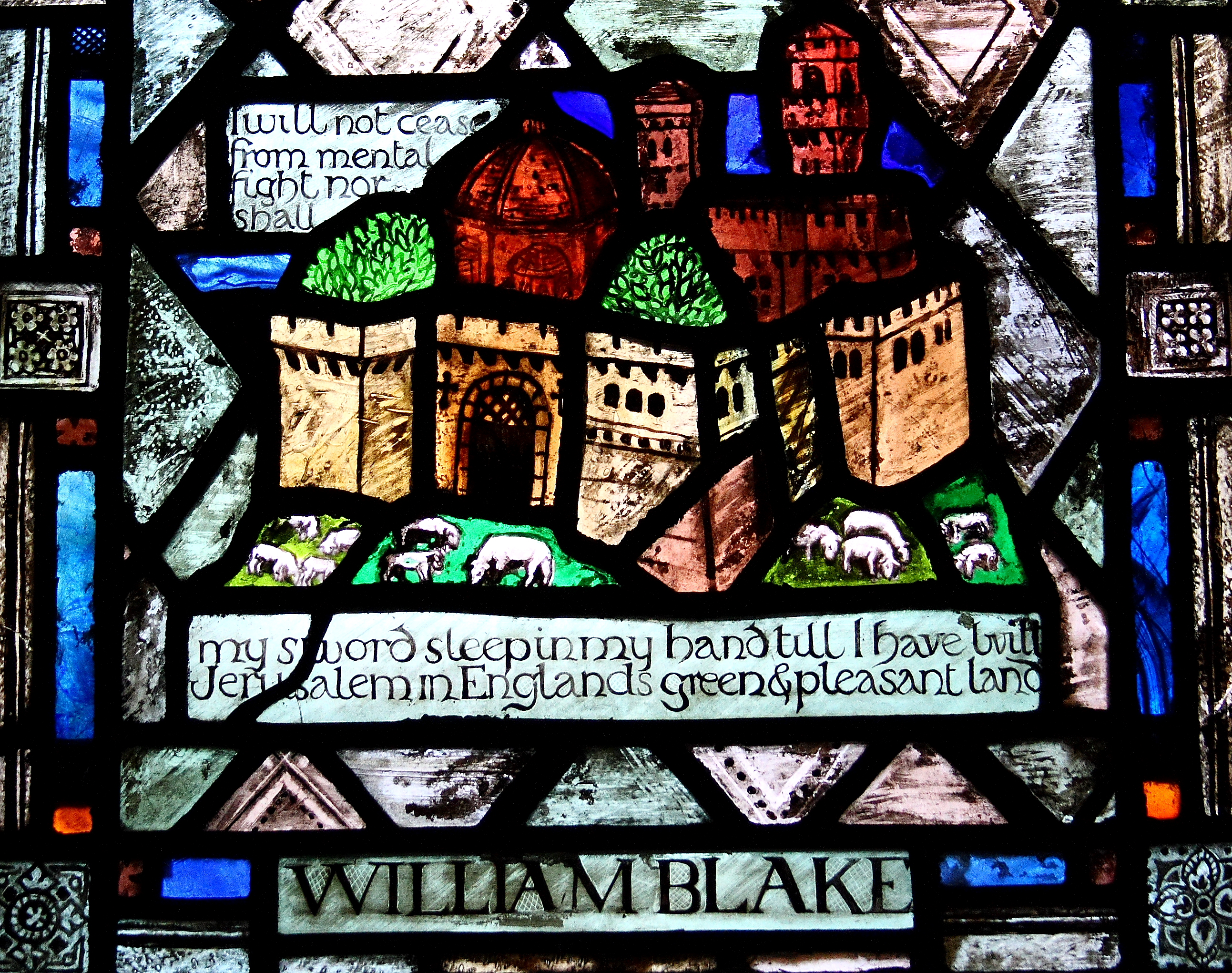
- Part of a stained glass window by Townshend at St Chad's Church, Bensham, Gateshead.
- Born: 1878; London, UKGBI
- Died: 10 June 1944 (aged 65–66); Pwllheli, Caernarvonshire, UK
- Education: Slade School of Fine Art; Central School of Arts and Crafts
- Known for: Stained Glass
- Mother: Emily Townshend
- Relatives: Isabella Frances Townshend (aunt)

Caroline Charlotte Townshend (4 September 1878 – 10 June 1944) was a British stained glass artist, suffragette and representative of the Arts and Crafts movement. In 1920, Townshend and Joan Howson established Townshend & Howson.

== Early life and education ==
Caroline Charlotte Townshend was born on 1878 in London to Chambré Corker Townshend (Note: Alternatively spelt "Cambrey"), an architect, and Emily Townshend (née Gibson), a social reformer and suffragette. Townshend was the one of five siblings, and was the paternal niece of Isabella Frances Townshend.

In 1882, the family moved to Switzerland before relocating to Florence in 1885. The family later returned to England and settled in Richmond, Yorkshire. Townsend was educated at Wycombe Abbey before studying at the Slade School of Fine Art. After a period as a student at the Slade she decided that she wanted to try stained glass and by 1901 asked Christopher Whall to take her on as a pupil. She assisted in his studio and attended his classes at the Central School of Arts and Crafts until 1903.

== Career ==
She set up her own studio at The Glass House in Fulham, South-West London in 1903. Many stained glass artists of the Arts and Crafts movement had their studios at The Glass House, including Mary Lowndes, Karl Parsons, Margaret Agnes Rope, M. E. Aldrich Rope, Theodora Salusbury, Arild Rosenkrantz, Wilhelmina Geddes, Clare Dawson, Rachel de Montmorency, Margaret Thompson, Lilian Josephine Pocock, Hugh Arnold and Edward Liddall Armitage.

It was at The Glass House in 1913 that she met Joan Howson, a student of the Liverpool School of Art, who would become her student and apprentice. In 1920 they set up their company Townshend & Howson. They moved to 61 Deodar Road in Putney which they had converted to house a studio and workshop, which was also shared by fellow stained glass artist M. E. Aldrich Rope. Neighbours included Edward Woore and other stained glass artists. During the earlier part of World War II, she cared for evacuee children at three hospitals in North Wales with Howson and Rope.

=== Fabianism ===
She was member of the Fabian Society, a democratic socialist organisation, and in 1910 was a candidate of the Labour Party for the Board of Guardians in Fulham, London. (Note: In the same reference showing Caroline Townshend's involvement with the Fabian Society are articles written by "Mrs. Townshend", possibly Caroline Townshend's mother on subjects including "The Case against the Charity Organization Society" (July 1911) and "The Case for School Nurseries" (September 1909). In Townshend family genealogical records, Caroline's mother was said to be the first woman to attend Girton College, a suffragette, member of the Fabian Society and was sent to Holloway Prison for two weeks for her suffragette activities. She was a member of the Governing Council of Hawnes School. Information was gleaned from a book about Emily Gibson Townshend: Emily Townshend 1849 – 1934. The Curwen Press, 1936.) In 1918, Townshend designed banners for the Fabian Society, executed by 19 women, and for the Conservative and Unionist Women's Franchise Association.

== Death ==
Caroline Townshend died on 10 June 1944 in Pwllheli, North Wales, leaving just over £30,000 to Joan Howson. Howson continued to use the name of their partnership after Townshend's death.

== Works ==
Works that Townshend completed before forming the partnership Townshend and Howson, with Joan Howson include:

=== St Mary Magdalene, Chulmleigh ===
- Location: Chulmleigh, Devon
- Year: 1903

Townshend's very first commission. was for a window in the north aisle of this church. It depicts Saints Cuthbert, Martin (shown in the act of sharing his cloak with a beggar outside Amiens) and Boniface. Described by Cherry and Pevsner as "three saints, charming scenes below, with subtle colours".

=== St Mary, Greenhithe ===
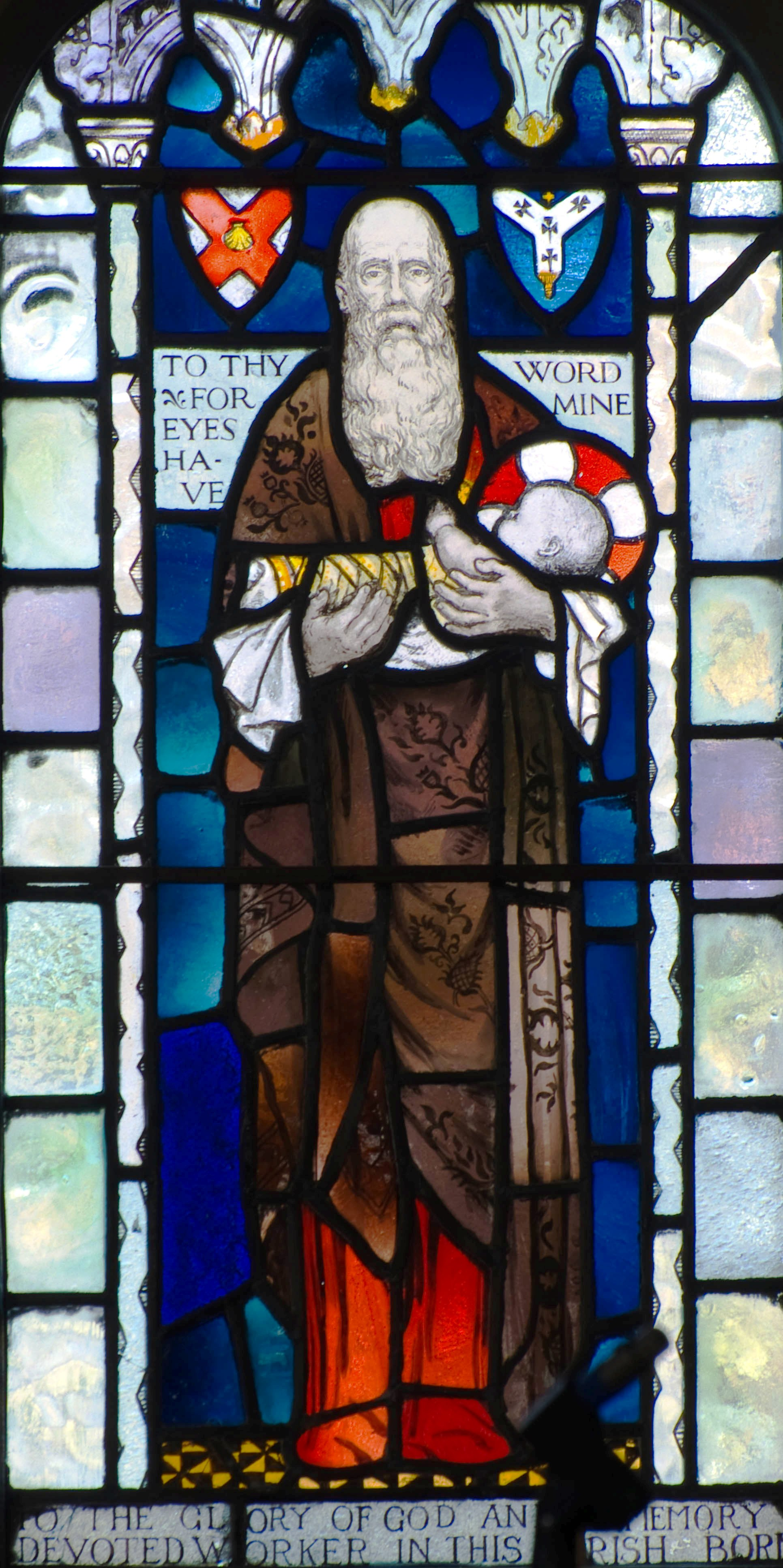
One of the lights of Townshend's window in St Mary Greenhithe

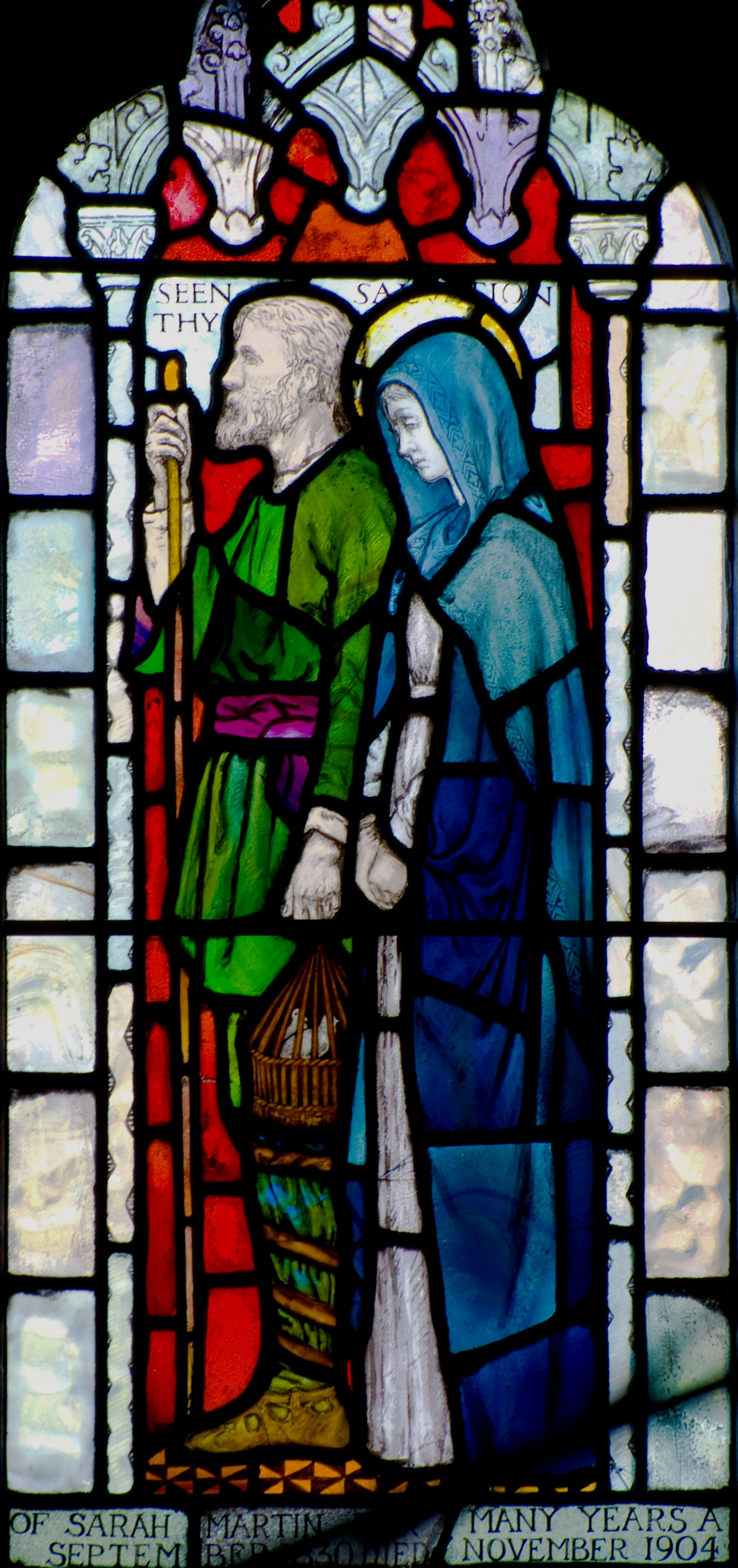
One of the lights of Townshend's window in St Mary Greenhithe

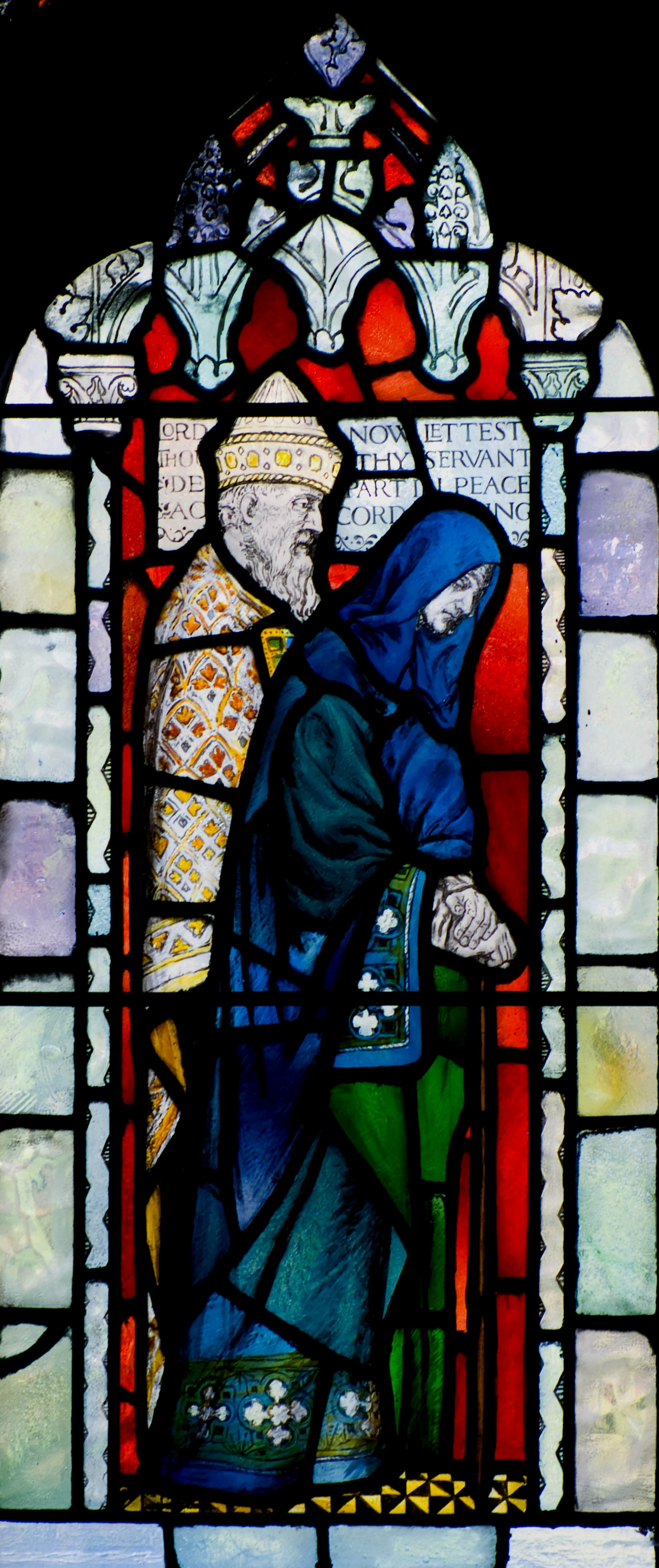
One of the lights of Townshend's window in St Mary Greenhithe
- Location: Greenhithe, Kent
- Year: 1904

This church, designed by Lewis Vulliamy dates back to 1855. Townshend completed a three-light window for the church's north aisle, an interpretation of the “Presentation in the Temple”.

=== St Andrew, Aysgarth ===
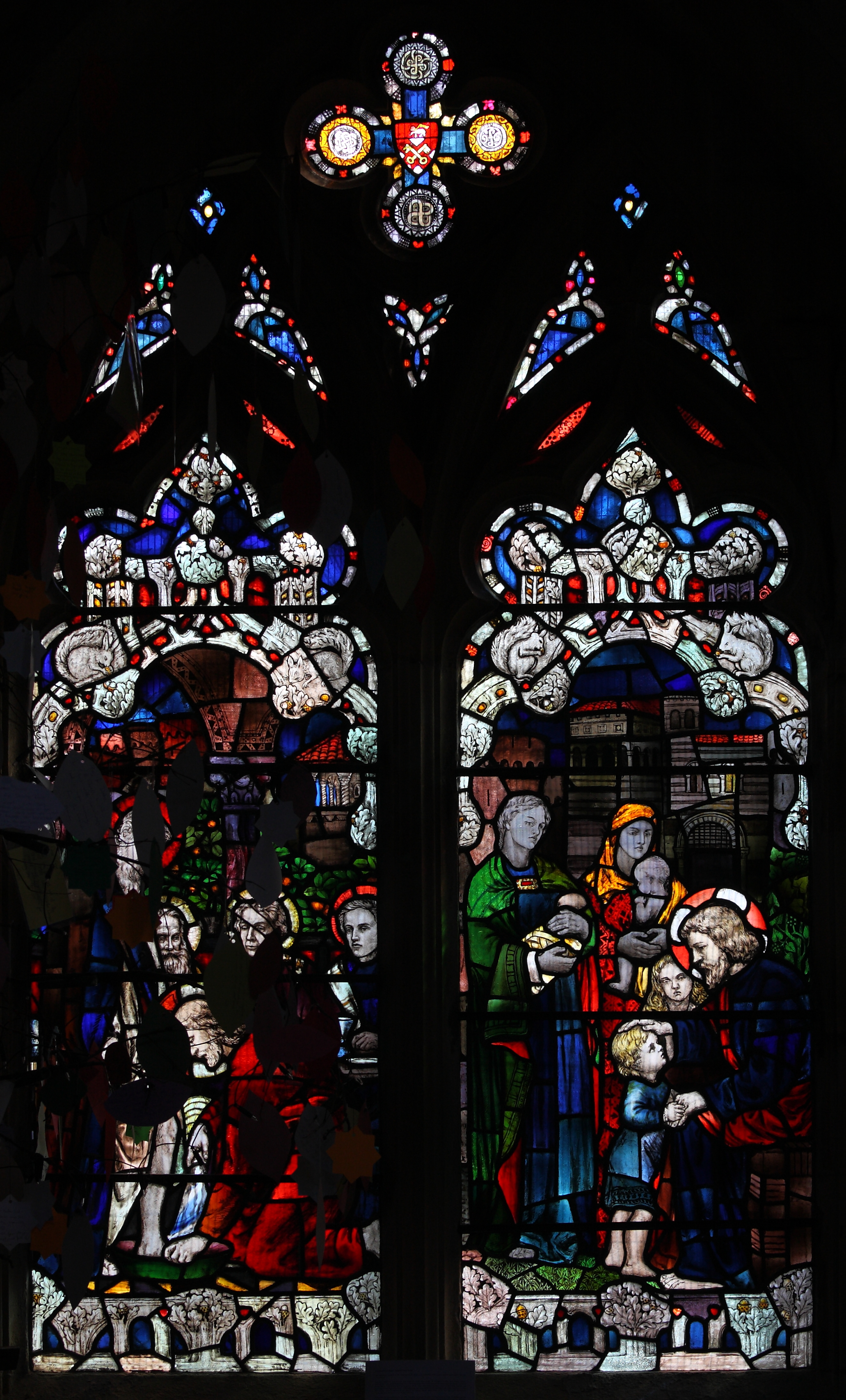
Window in St Andrew Aysgarth. Photograph courtesy Dave Webster

- Location: Aysgarth, Yorkshire
- Year: 1905

This church has a two-light window by Townshend. In the left hand light Jesus washes the feet of his disciples, while in the other he is depicted blessing the children.

=== St Chad's Church, Bensham ===
- Location: Bensham, Gateshead
- Year: 1907

The chapel of All Saints in this church has two twin-light windows by Townshend dating from 1907. or 1908.

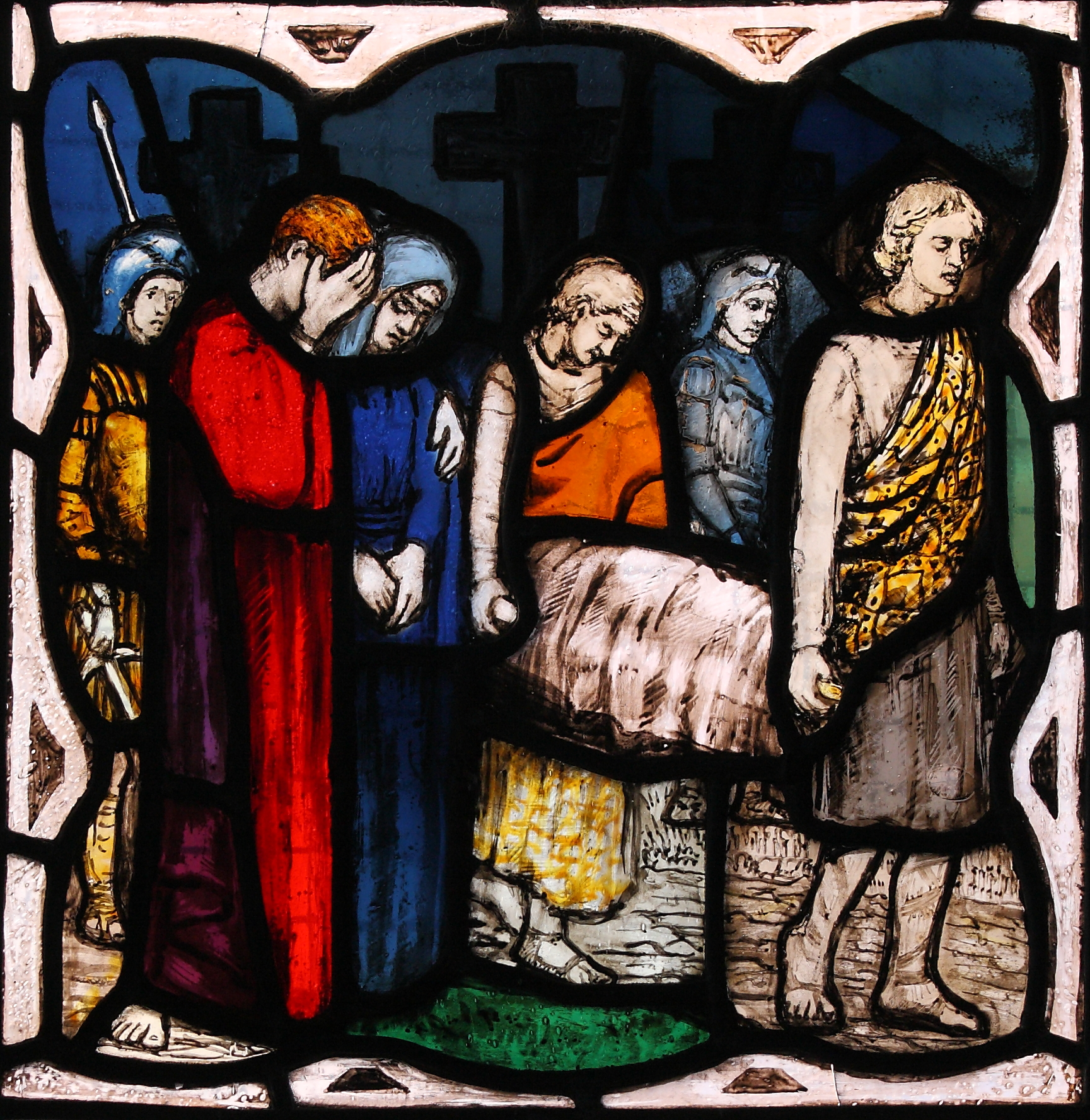
Part of St Chad window. Photograph courtesy Dave Webster

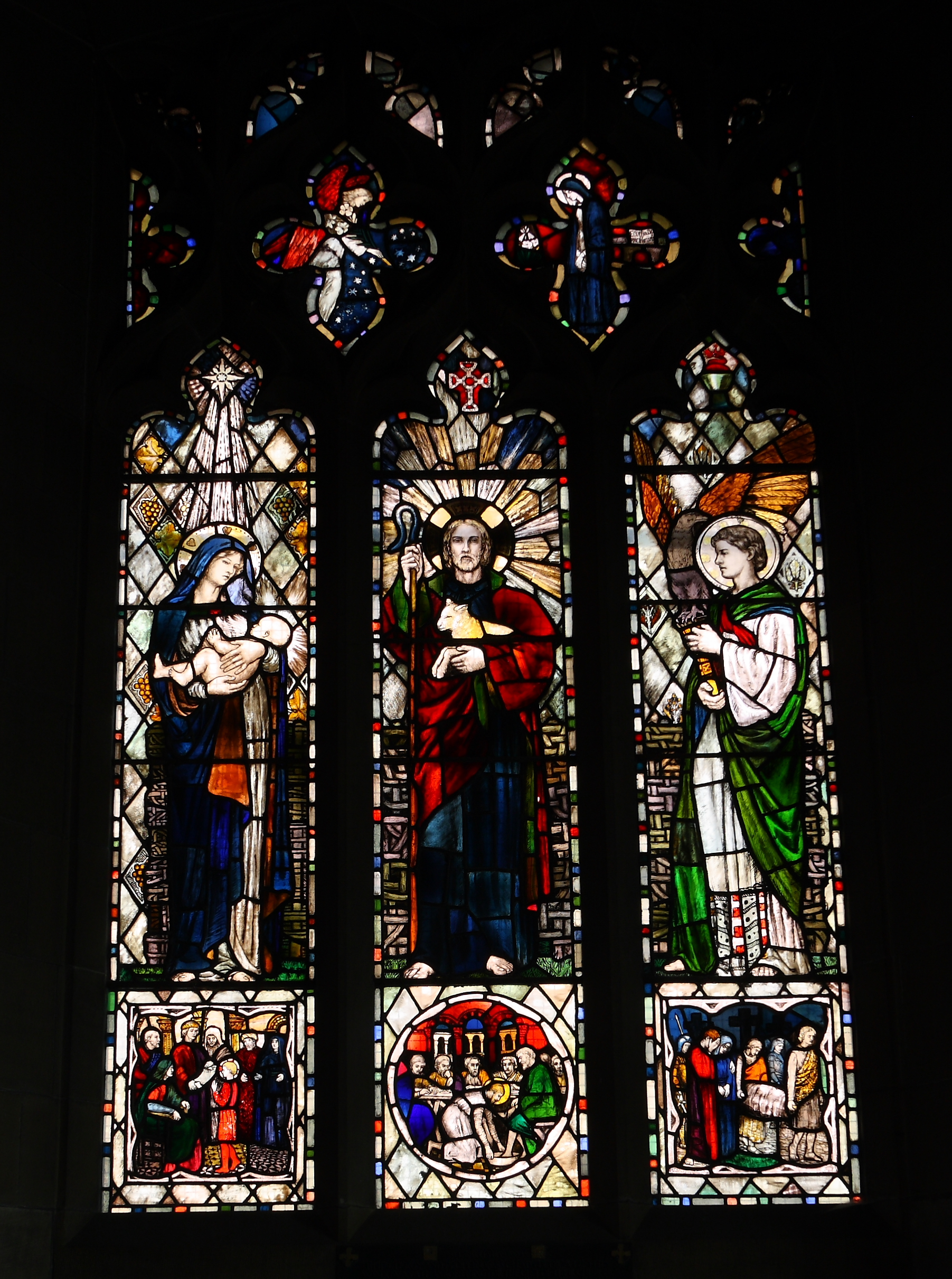
Full view St Chad window. Photograph courtesy Dave Webster

=== St Bartholomew, Ducklington ===
- Location: Ducklington, Oxfordshire
- Year: 1908

There is a three-light window by Townshend at the east end of the church's south aisle. It shows Christ with St Cecilia on one side and Dorcas on the other. in the south aisle of the church there is a second window by Townshend and Howson which dates to 1934. It is of three-lights and depicts St Hugh of Lincoln in the centre light.

=== Newcastle Cathedral ===
- Location: Newcastle, Northumberland
- Year: 1907

Townshend completed the large four-light window in the north choir aisle of St Nicholas' Cathedral church, described as "an outstanding window of 1907 showing Northumbrian Saints and St Nicholas” by Nikolaus Pevsner and Ian Richmond.

=== Exchange Buildings, Newcastle upon Tyne ===
- Location: Newcastle upon Tyne, Northumberland
- Year: circa 1910

Townshend carried out some glazing work for this building.

=== The "Fabian Window" ===
- Year: 1910

The "Fabian Window", on loan to the London School of Economics (LSE) Shaw Library since 2006, was made by Townshend in 1910, to a design by George Bernard Shaw. The window, shows Edward R. Pease, Sidney Webb and other members of the Fabian Society "helping to build "the new world"". It is thought to have remained in Townshend's studio until after her death. In 1947 it was presented to the Webb Memorial Trust's Beatrice Webb House near Dorking, from where it was stolen in 1978. It surfaced in Phoenix, Arizona soon afterwards but then disappeared again, and in the following years the only evidence of the work was the cartoon made by Townshend. The window was bought back by the Webb Memorial Trust following its reappearance at Sotheby's in July 2005.

In an article published on the LSE website it is described as having been cited as an example of "Shavian wit":

the figures are in Tudor dress to poke fun at Pease who evidently loved everything medieval. The Fabian Society coat of arms is shown as a wolf in sheep's clothing. The first man, crouching on the left, is H. G. Wells, cocking a snook at the others. He is followed by the actor-manager Charles Charrington, Aylmer Maude (translator of Tolstoy's War and Peace), G. Stirling Taylor (reading a book, New Worlds for Old), and the dentist F. Lawson Dodd. The women, from left to right, are Maud Pember Reeves (mother of Amber Reeves, who bore Wells a daughter in 1909), Miss Hankin, the suffragist Miss Mabel Atkinson, Mrs Boyd Dawson, and, at the end, the artist who made the window, Caroline Townshend herself.

It was the Fabians, Beatrice and Sidney Webb, and George Bernard Shaw who founded the London School of Economics (LSE), where the work is now housed.

=== St Cuthbert, Seascale ===
- Location: Seascale, Cumbria
- Year: 1910–11

Townshend completed a four-light east window depicting The Virgin and Child and "Christ in Majesty" surrounded by various Saints including James the Great, Andrew and James the Less. She also completed another window on the north side of the church.

=== St Nicholas, Willoughby ===
- Location: Willoughby, Warwickshire

This church has a three-light window by Townshend. The central light contains a Salvator Mundi ("Saviour of the World") and those on either side the lights show St Nicholas and Mary Magdalene.

=== St Paul's Cathedral, Rockhampton ===
- Location: Rockhampton, Queensland
- Years: 1914 and 1921

In 1914 the Bishop of Rockhampton visited England and approached various artists with a view to commissioning stained glass for the cathedral. He chose Townshend, who designed five windows for the cathedral's apse. The three central windows were made and installed in 1914. They depict the Crucifixion, Christ in Majesty and Pentecost. Two other windows depicting the Nativity and the Adoration of the Lamb were installed in 1924.

=== St Nectan's Church, Hartland, Devon ===
- Location: Hartland, Devon
- years: 1930 and 1933

Townshend and Howsen painted windows for both St Nectan's church, Hartland and for St john's Chapel of Ease, Hartland. The windows were commissioned by Richard Pearse Chope and possibly John Lane. The subject matter is not religious but depicts the history of Hartland through the years. In order south east to north east: The Gytha window; The manorial window; the William window; the Alfred window & the Arthur window. Further work is three small roundels in the Mary Chapel window. Within St John's Chapel of Ease a window showing St Augustine & St Francis is in situ as a memorial to the wife of Mr Wilton, headmaster of the local school.

== Other work ==
Townshend's work was included in an exhibition organised by the William Morris Gallery in 1985 to celebrate the contribution of women to the art of stained glass. Exhibits included her 1906 design for a window depicting St Crispin, the patron saint of cobblers, this window destined for the Cripples' Cobbling School which was part of the Southwark Settlement and also the 1905 design for a window commissioned by the Newcastle antiquarian William Street, of 9 Charlotte Street in North Shields. It is not known whether these windows have survived. Townshend's mother's family were from Newcastle and this connection lead to her receiving several commissions in the North East.

== Gallery ==
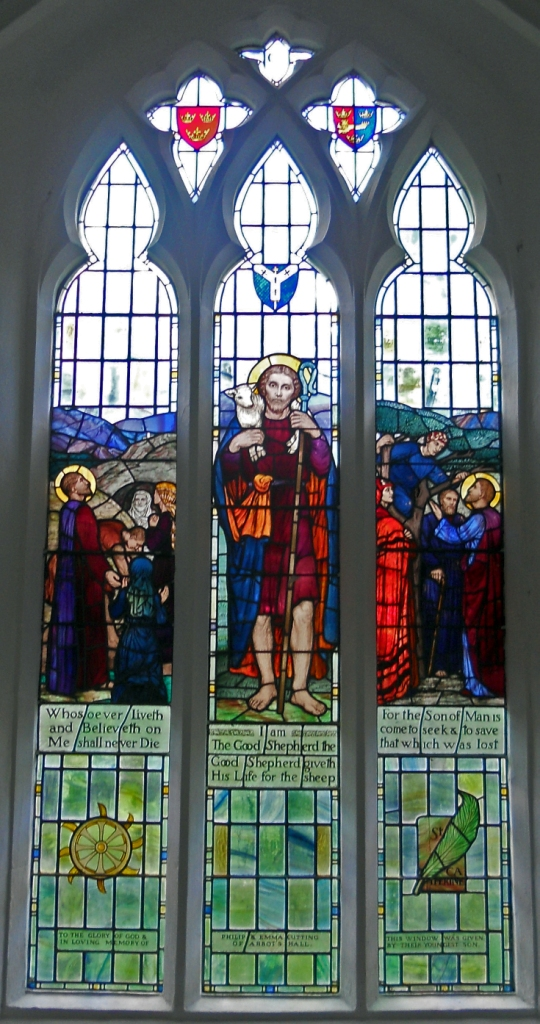
Stained Glass Window in Pettaugh Suffolk by Townshend and Howson

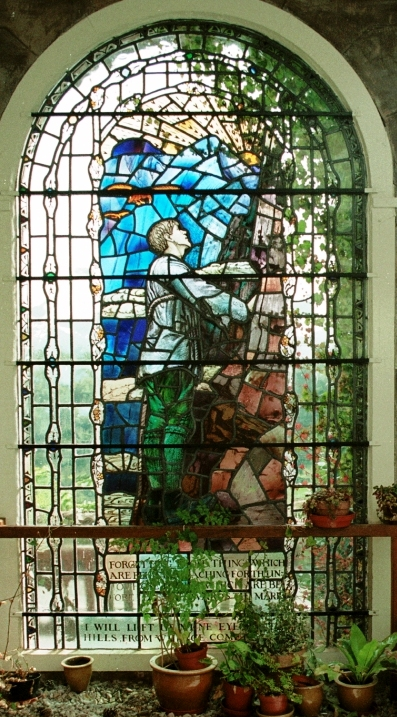
Caroline Townshend window in Outward Bound College in Eksdale

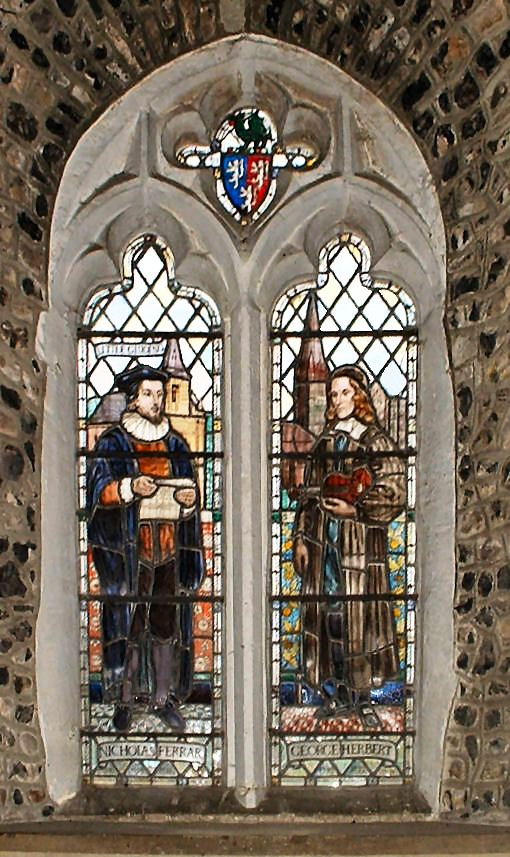
The Church of St Andrew, Bemerton, is known as George Herbert's Church. Townshend and Howson were responsible for the window's design and execution.

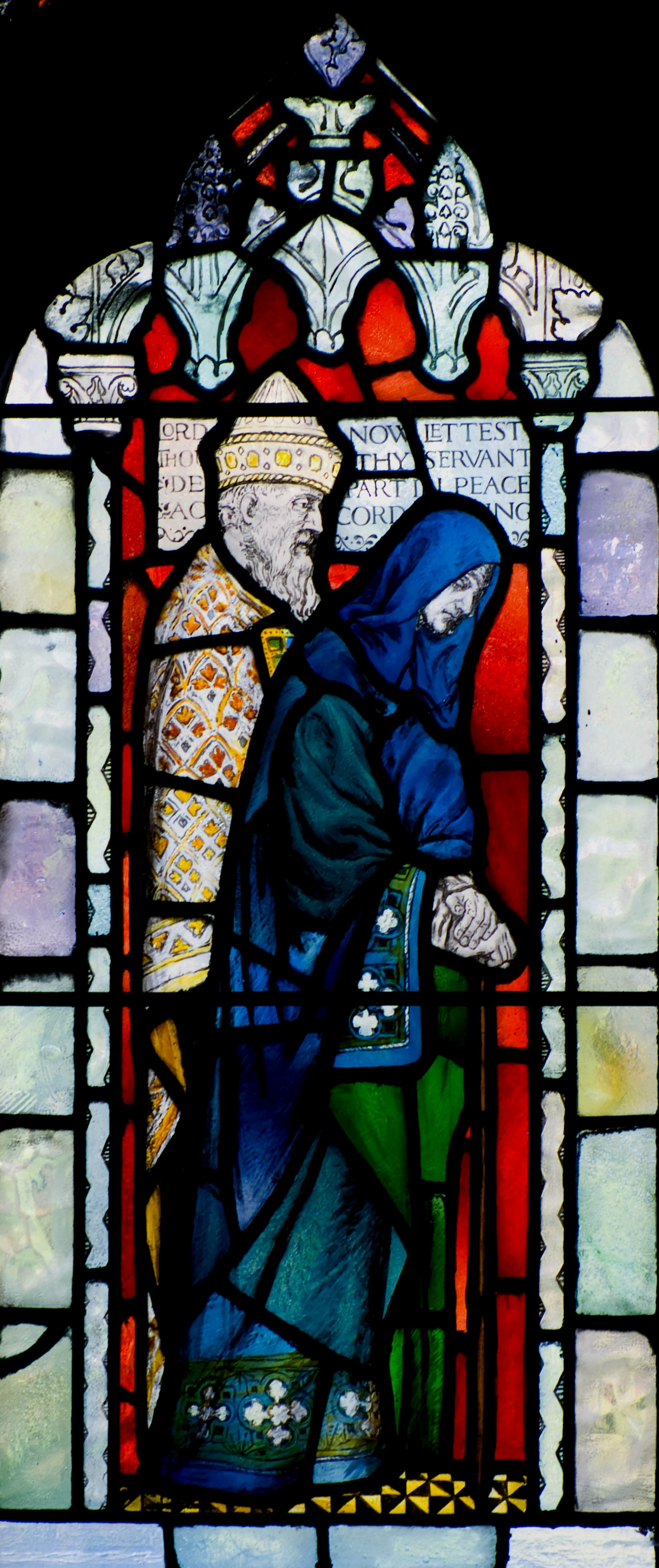
Part of window in St Mary's Church Greenhithe

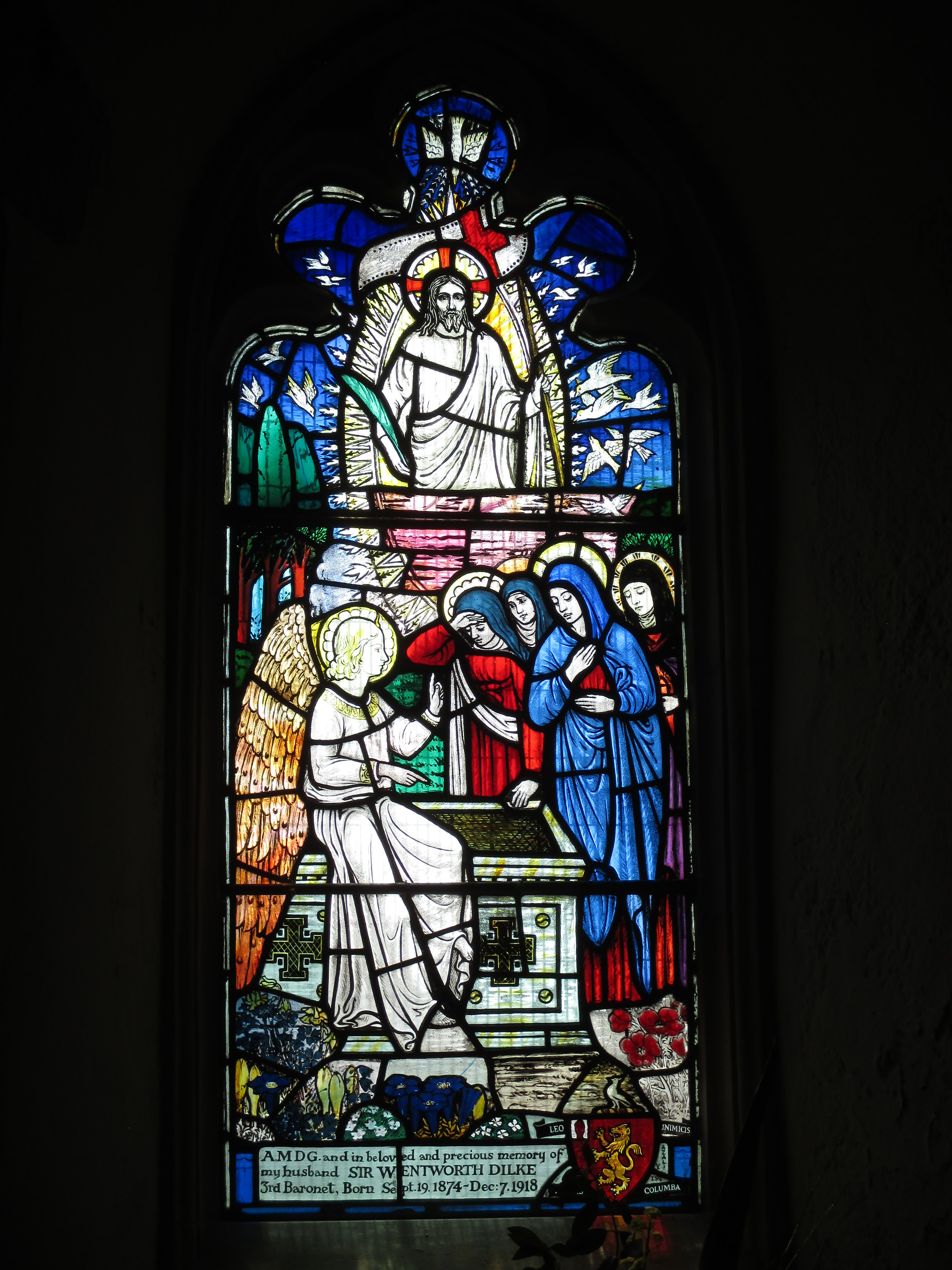
Caroline Townshend window in St Margaret's Church, Rottingdean
