= Henry Tomkinson =

English sportsman

Personal information
- Full name: Henry Richard Tomkinson
- Born: 28 August 1831; Nantwich, Cheshire, England
- Died: 9 December 1906 (aged 75); Roehampton, Surrey, England
- Batting: Unknown

Domestic team information
- Years: Team
- 1851: Cambridge University

Career statistics
Competition	First-class
Matches	1
Runs scored	14
Batting average	7.00
100s/50s	–/–
Top score	14
Catches/stumpings	1/–
- Source: Cricinfo, 26 January 2023

Henry Richard Tomkinson (28 August 1831 – 9 December 1906) was an English sportsman who represented Cambridge University in both rowing and first-class cricket. He was born in Nantwich, Cheshire and died at Roehampton, then in Surrey, now in London.

Tomkinson was educated at Rugby School and at Trinity College, Cambridge. He played cricket at Rugby as a middle-order batsman; in his single first-class match for Cambridge University he made 14 as an opening batsman against the Marylebone Cricket Club in an early-season game in 1851, and failed to score when batting further down the order in the second innings. He was not selected again, and it is not known whether he batted right- or left-handed. Tomkinson appears to have turned his sporting attention next to rowing, and in 1853 he was a member of the Cambridge University rowing eight. In that year, the schedule for the University Boat Race coincided with the Henley Royal Regatta, so the Boat Race was not held; however, Tomkinson was a member of the Cambridge University Boat Club crew which was defeated by Oxford in the Grand Challenge Cup at Henley, which Oxford University won.

Tomkinson graduated from Cambridge University with a Bachelor of Arts degree in 1854, having been placed as 36th Wrangler in the Mathematical Tripos; the degree was converted to a Master of Arts in 1857. After Cambridge, he had a varied career as a schoolmaster at Marlborough College, as a barrister, in the insurance industry, and latterly as the landowner of family estates at Reaseheath near Nantwich.
