= Remembrance poppy =

Artificial flower worn to commemorate military personnel who have died during war

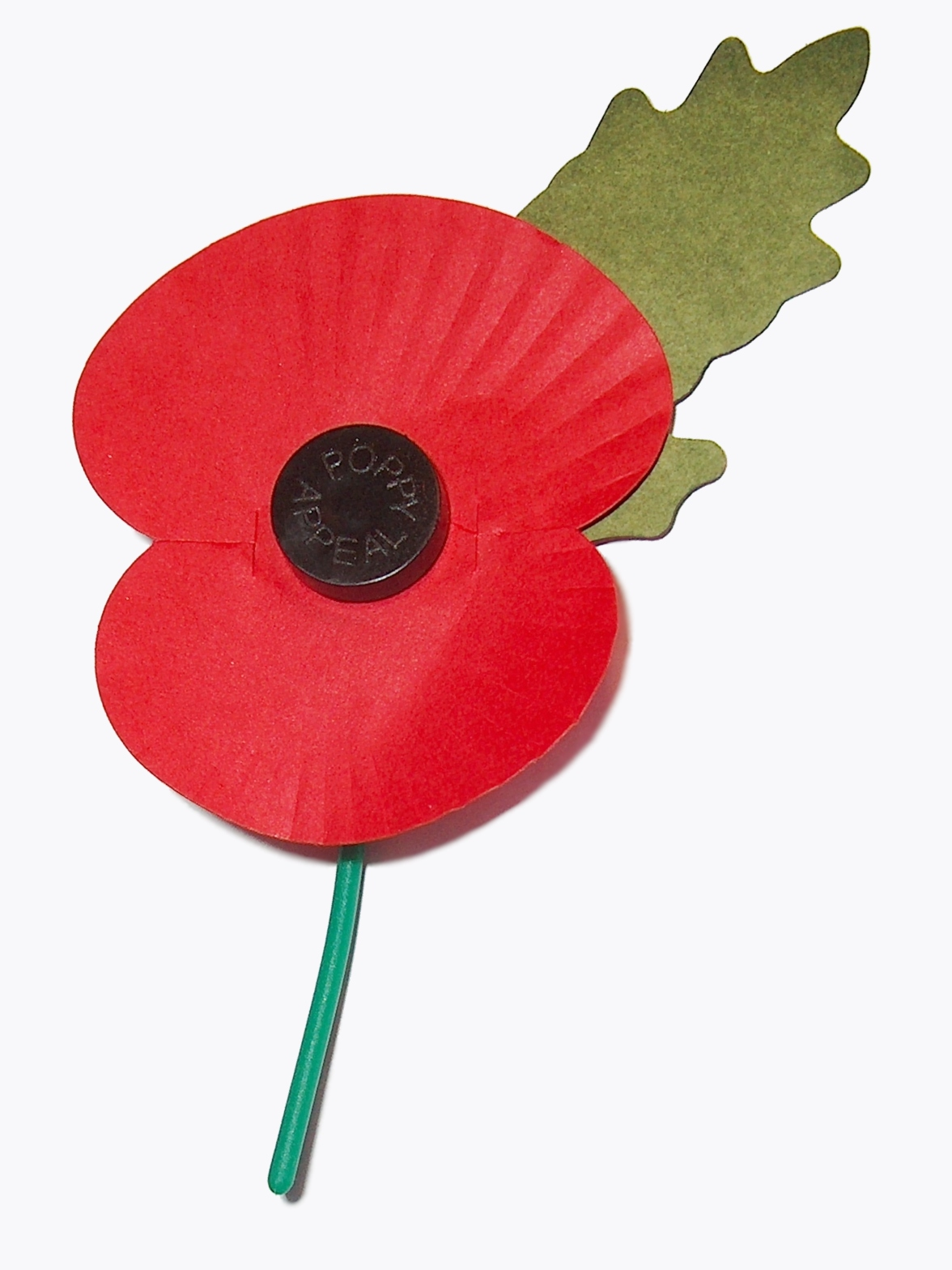
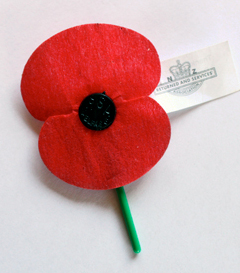
Remembrance poppies distributed by the Royal British Legion (top) and the Royal New Zealand Returned and Services' Association (bottom).

A remembrance poppy is an artificial flower resembling a red poppy, worn in some countries to commemorate their military personnel who died in war. Remembrance poppies are produced by veterans' associations, which exchange the poppies for charitable donations used to give financial and practical support to members and veterans of the armed forces.

Inspired by the war poem "In Flanders Fields" and promoted by Moina Michael, they were first used near the end of World War I to commemorate British Empire and United States military casualties of the war. Anna Guérin established the first "Poppy Days" to raise funds for veterans, widows, orphans and liberty bonds, as well as charities such as the Red Cross.

Remembrance poppies are most commonly worn in Commonwealth countries, where the symbol has been trademarked by veterans' associations for fundraising. Remembrance poppies in Commonwealth countries are often worn on clothing in the weeks leading up to Remembrance Day, with poppy wreaths also being laid at war memorials on that day. However, in New Zealand, remembrance poppies are most commonly worn on Anzac Day.

The red remembrance poppy has inspired the design of several other commemorative poppies that observe different aspects of war and peace. In France, a bleuet de France is worn instead of a remembrance poppy to commemorate military personnel who died in war.

== Origins ==
References to war and poppies in Flanders can be found as early as the 19th century, in the book The Scottish Soldiers of Fortune by James Grant:

The Scots in Holland and Flanders: At Neerwinden, in 1693, the brigade again suffered heavy loss, and William was compelled again to give way before the white-coated infantry of France with the loss of 10,000 men. "During many months after", wrote the Earl of Perth to his sister (as quoted by Macaulay), "the ground was strewn with skulls and bones of horses and men, and with fragments of hats, shoes, saddles, and holsters. The next summer the soil, fertilised by 20,000 corpses, broke forth into millions of scarlet poppies."

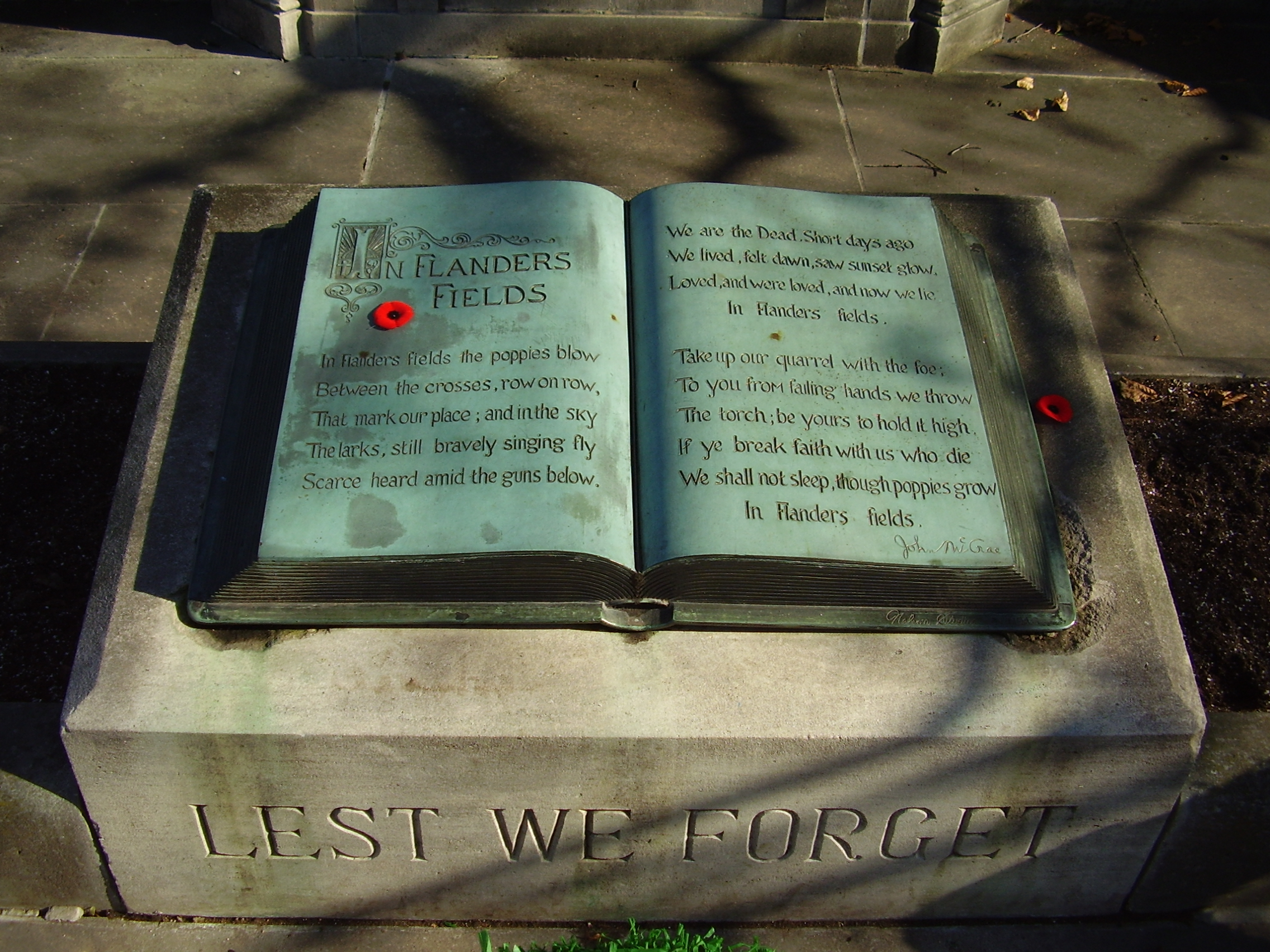
A Canadian remembrance poppy adorns a memorial with the words to "In Flanders Fields" at McCrae House.

The opening lines of the World War I poem "In Flanders Fields" refer to Flanders poppies growing among the graves of war victims in a region of Belgium. The poem is written from the point of view of the fallen soldiers and in its last verse, the soldiers call on the living to continue the conflict. The poem was written by Canadian physician John McCrae on 3 May 1915 after witnessing the death of his friend and fellow soldier the day before. The poem was first published on 8 December 1915 in the London-based magazine Punch.

Moina Michael, who had taken leave from her professorship at the University of Georgia to be a volunteer worker for the American YMCA Overseas War Secretaries Organization, was inspired by the poem. She published a poem of her own called "We Shall Keep the Faith" in 1918. In tribute to McCrae's poem, she vowed to always wear a red poppy as a symbol of remembrance for those who fought in and assisted with the war. At a November 1918 YMCA Overseas War Secretaries' conference, she appeared with a silk poppy pinned to her coat and distributed twenty-five more poppies to attendees. She then campaigned to have the poppy adopted as a national symbol of remembrance.

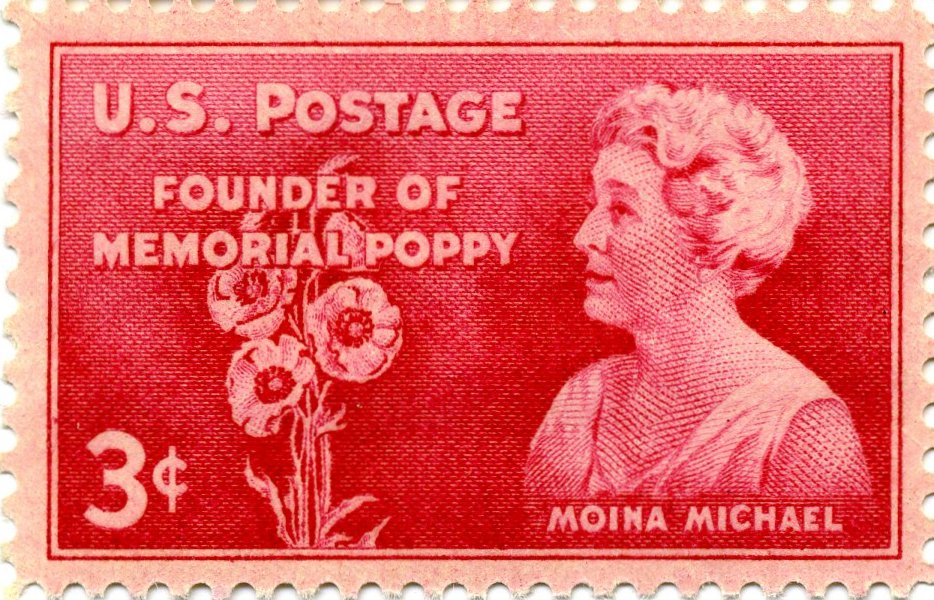
US postage stamp commemorating Moina Michael as the creator of the remembrance poppy

At its conference in 1920, the National American Legion adopted the poppy as their official symbol of remembrance. Frenchwoman Anna Guérin was invited to address American Legion delegates at their 1920 Cleveland Convention about "Inter-Allied Poppy Day". After the convention, the American Legion too adopted the poppy as its memorial flower and committed to support Guérin in her planned U.S. Poppy Day. It was also following this event that the American Legion christened Guérin as "The Poppy Lady from France". Guérin successfully organized the U.S.'s first nationwide Poppy Day during the week before Memorial Day in May 1921 using silk poppies made by the widows and children of the devastated regions of France.

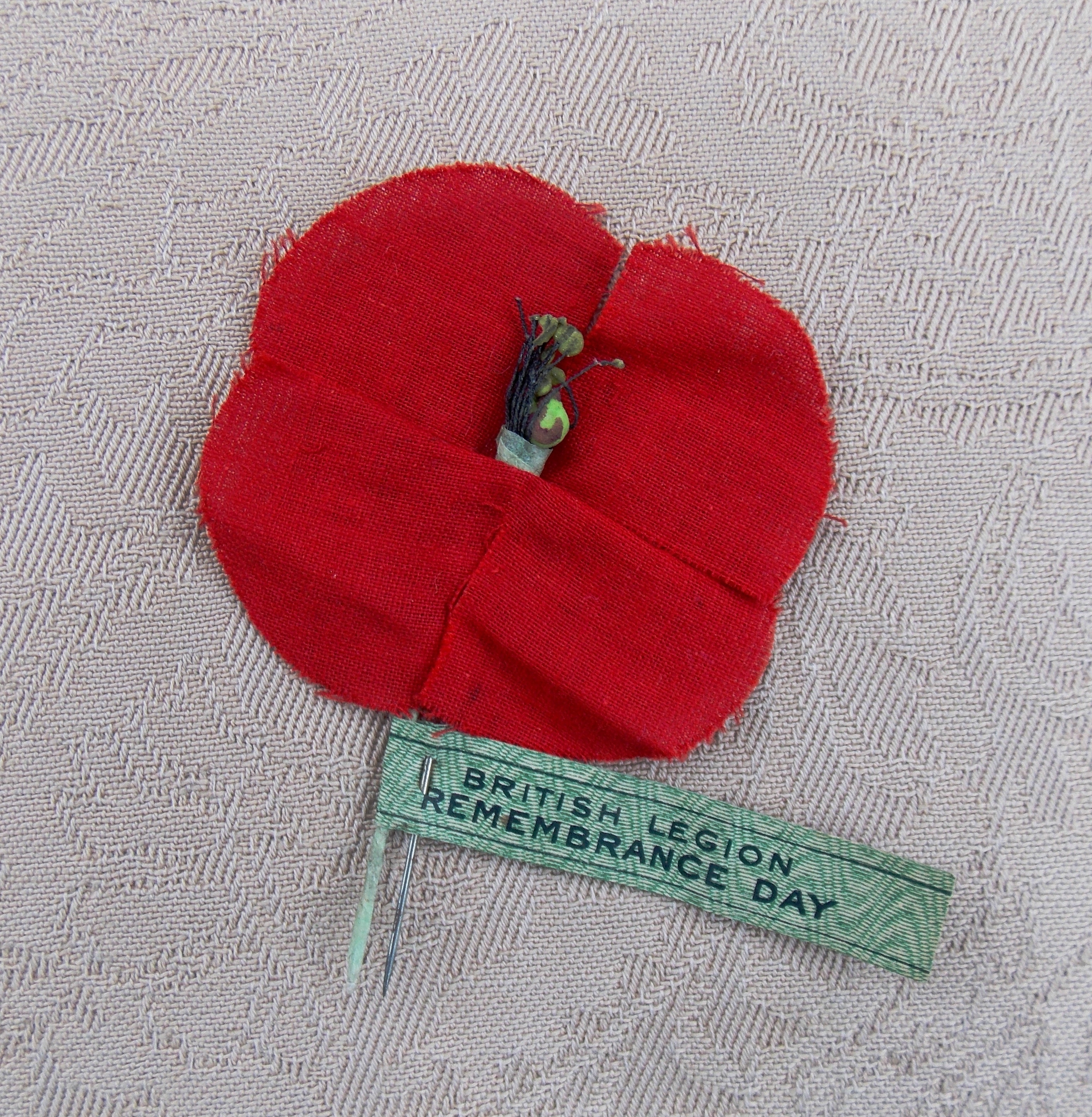
A French-made remembrance poppy made for the British Legion from 1921. Anna Guérin organised the distribution of these poppies in 1921 to help popularise the "Inter-Allied Poppy Day".

When the American Legion stopped using the poppy symbol in favor of the daisy, Veterans of Foreign Wars' members supported Guérin instead. Using French-made poppies purchased through her, the V.F.W. organized the first veterans' Poppy Day Drive in the US, for the 1922 Memorial Day. In 1924, the Veterans of Foreign Wars patented the Buddy Poppy.

Guérin's "Inter-Allied Poppy Day" idea was also adopted by military veterans' groups in parts of the British Empire. After the 1921 Memorial Day in the US, Guérin traveled to Canada. After she addressed the Great War Veteran Association on 4 July, the group also adopted the poppy emblem as well as "Inter-Allied Poppy Day" concept. They were the first veterans of the British Empire (predecessor of the Commonwealth of Nations) to do so.

Guérin sent Colonel Moffat (ex-American Red Cross) to Australia and New Zealand afterwards as her representative. She then traveled to Great Britain, where she informed Field Marshal Douglas Haig and the Royal British Legion about her idea. Because it was an underfunded organization, Guérin paid for the British remembrance poppies herself and the British Legion reimbursed her after the first British Remembrance Day/Poppy Day on 11 November 1921. By 1921, remembrance poppies had become widely accepted through the Allies of World War I as a flower of remembrance to be worn on Armistice Day.

== Distribution and use ==
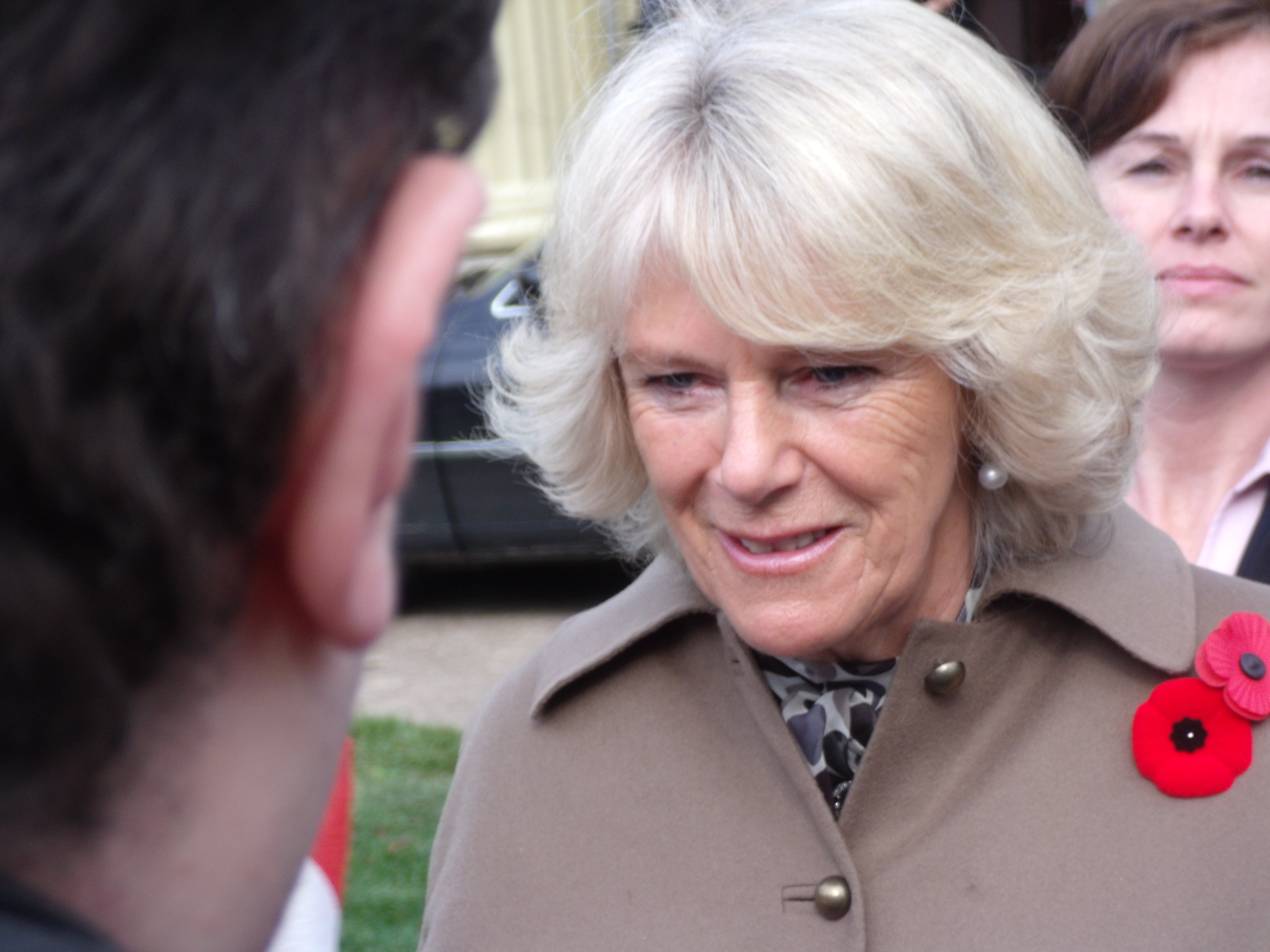
Queen Camilla (then Duchess of Cornwall) wearing a Scottish poppy (top) and a Canadian poppy (bottom).

Remembrance poppies are primarily distributed in the weeks leading up to Remembrance Day in several countries of the Commonwealth of Nations. However, in New Zealand, it is distributed in the weeks leading up to Anzac Day. Remembrance poppies are distributed by a national veterans' organisation to commemorate military veterans and to raise funds for veterans' groups and programs.

There are several remembrance poppy designs, as several national veterans' organisations produce their own remembrance poppies. Several Commonwealth countries in the Caribbean, including Barbados, Guyana, Jamaica, and Trinidad and Tobago, share the same design used in Canada, as they source their remembrance poppies from the Royal Canadian Legion through the Royal Commonwealth Ex-Services League.

Although remembrance poppies are predominantly used in the Commonwealth, they are also used to a lesser extent in several other countries.

=== Australia ===
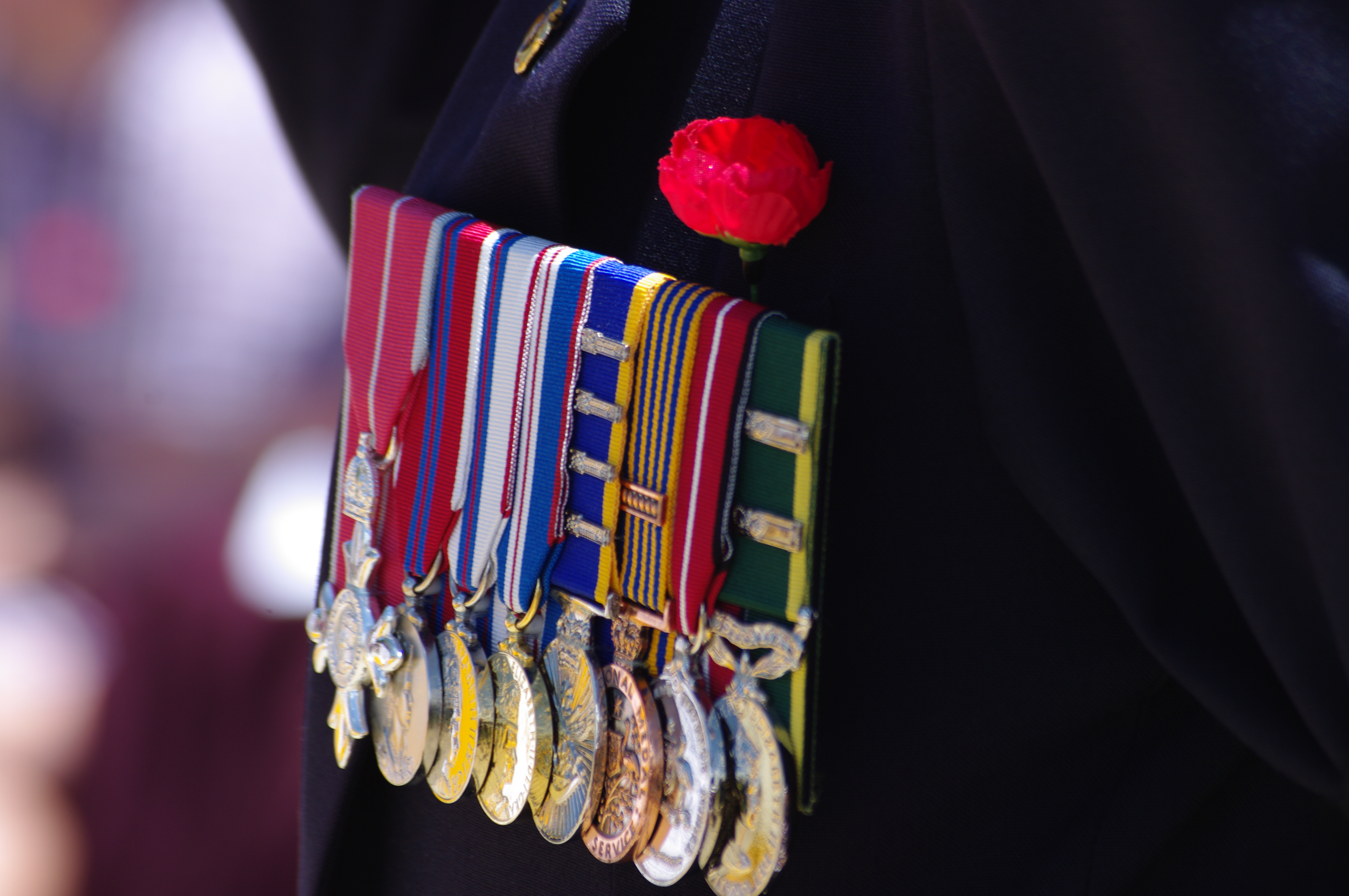
A poppy distributed by the Returned and Services League of Australia worn above several service medals.

In Australia, cloth and paper remembrance poppies, also called the Flanders poppies, have been distributed by the Returned and Services League of Australia since 1921 as official memorial flowers for Remembrance Day. The practice of wearing a remembrance poppy is generally reserved for Remembrance Day in Australia, and is typically not observed on other holidays that commemorate military veterans, like Anzac Day.

Although remembrance poppies are not worn on Anzac Day, their symbolism remains prominent on that holiday, with poppy plants and wreaths traditionally placed at war memorials.

=== Barbados ===
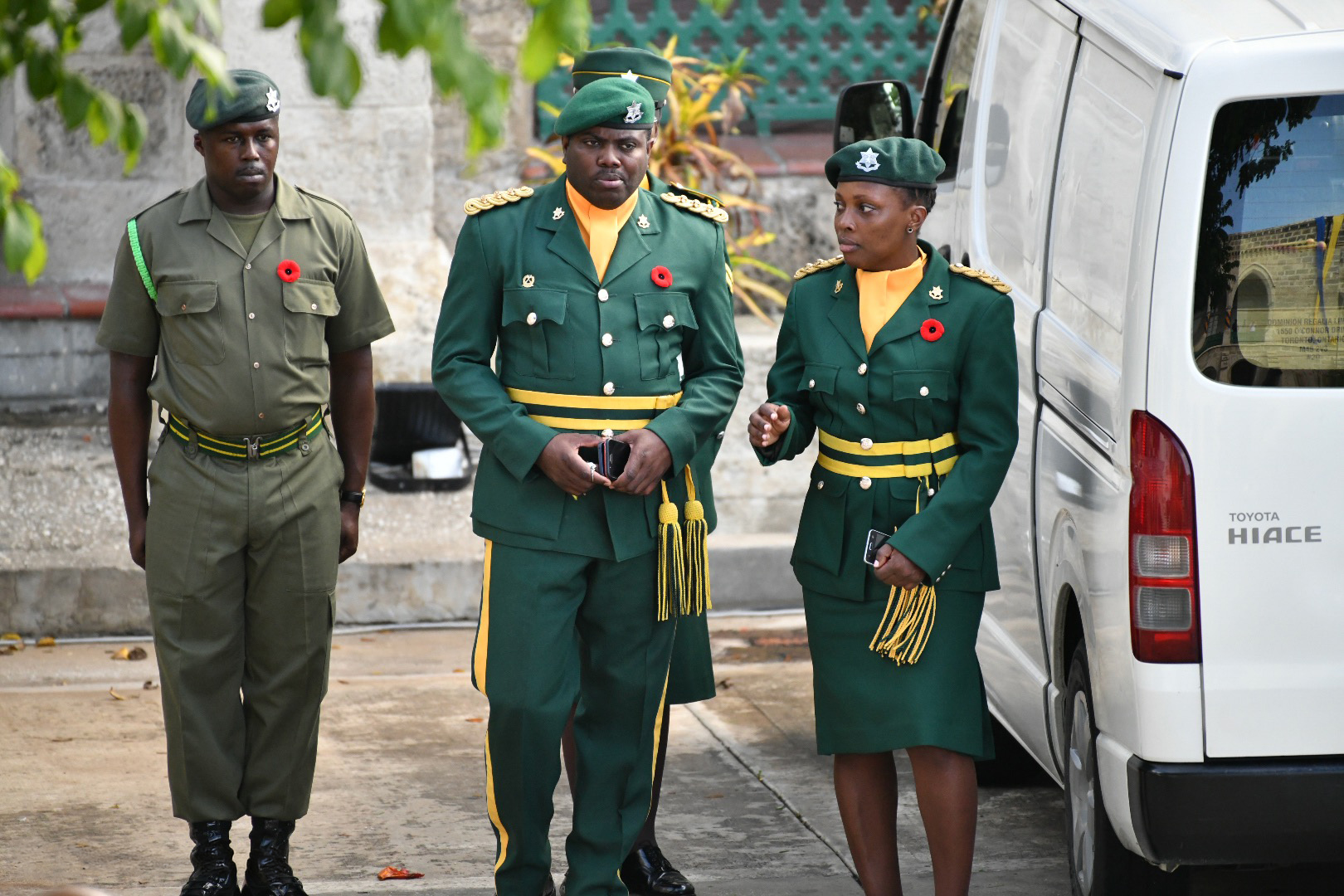
Members of the Barbados Defence Force wearing remembrance poppies at a Remembrance Day service

The first remembrance poppies used in Barbados were distributed in 1923 by the Barbados Poppy League. The Barbados Poppy League, the fundraising arm of the Barbados Legion, was established by the colonial governor of Barbados, Charles O'Brien, the year before. The Barbados Poppy League receives their remembrance poppies from the Royal Canadian Legion through the Royal Commonwealth Ex-Services League.

=== Canada ===
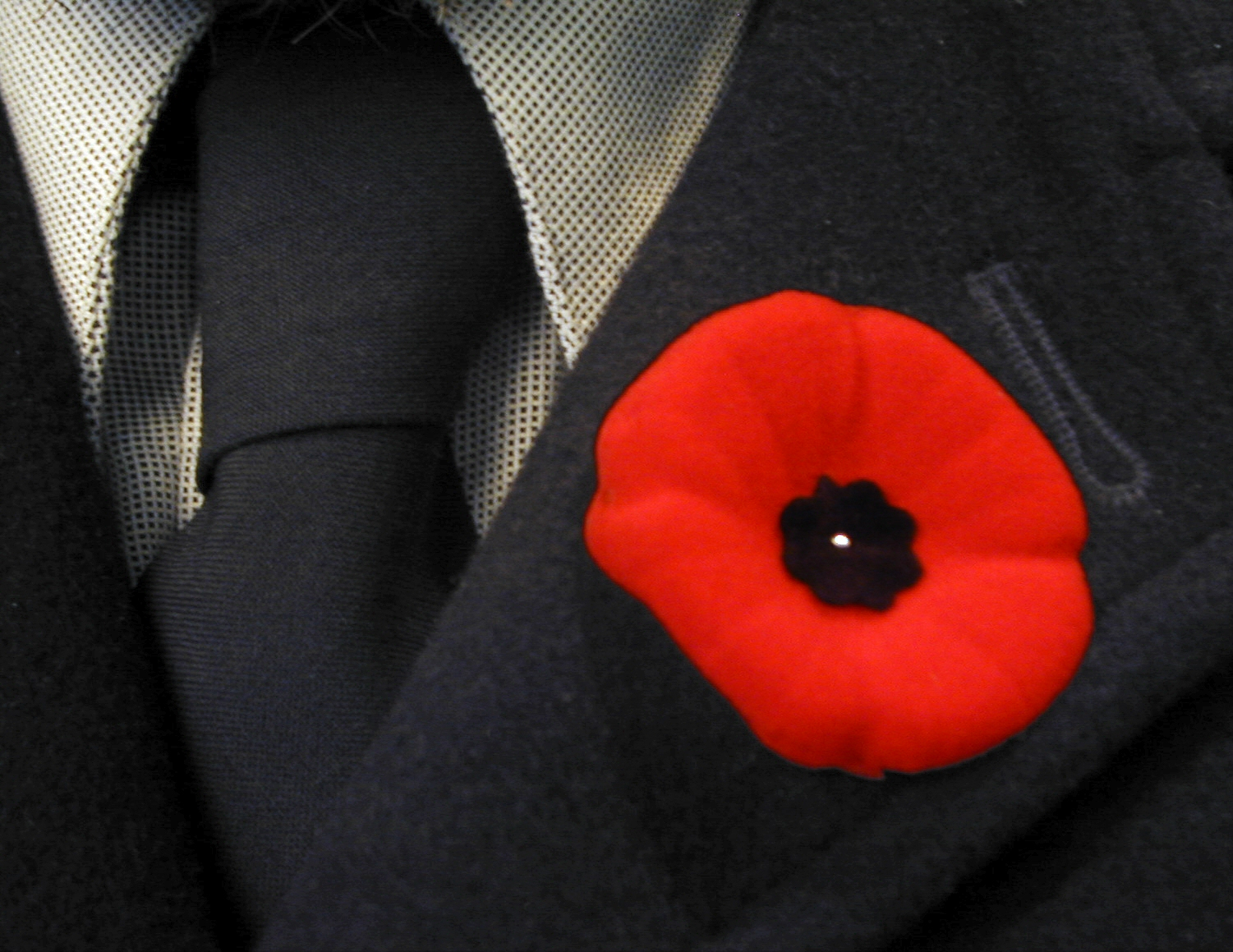
A poppy distributed by the Royal Canadian Legion worn on the lapel

In Canada, the poppy is the official symbol of remembrance, and was adopted as such in 1921. It is generally worn beginning on the last Friday of October leading up to November 11. The first poppy is customarily presented to the Governor General of Canada by the Dominion President of the Royal Canadian Legion. The Royal Canadian Legion, which has trademarked the image, suggests that poppies be worn on the left lapel, or as near the heart as possible.

The Canadian poppy design features four petals, a black centre and no leaf. The remembrance poppy is made up of two pieces of moulded plastic covered with flocking with a pin for fastening to clothing. From 1980 to 2002, the centres were changed to green. Current designs are black only; this change confused those unfamiliar with the original design. In 2007, poppy stickers were introduced for children, the elderly, and healthcare and food industry workers. A cast metal "Canada Remembers" pin featuring a gold maple leaf and two poppies, one representing the fallen and the other representing those who remained on the home front, is also issued.

Until 1996, poppies were made by disabled veterans in Canada, but they have since been made by a private contractor. Remembrance poppies produced for the Royal Canadian Legion are made in Toronto, with the legion distributing over 18 million poppies in 2011.

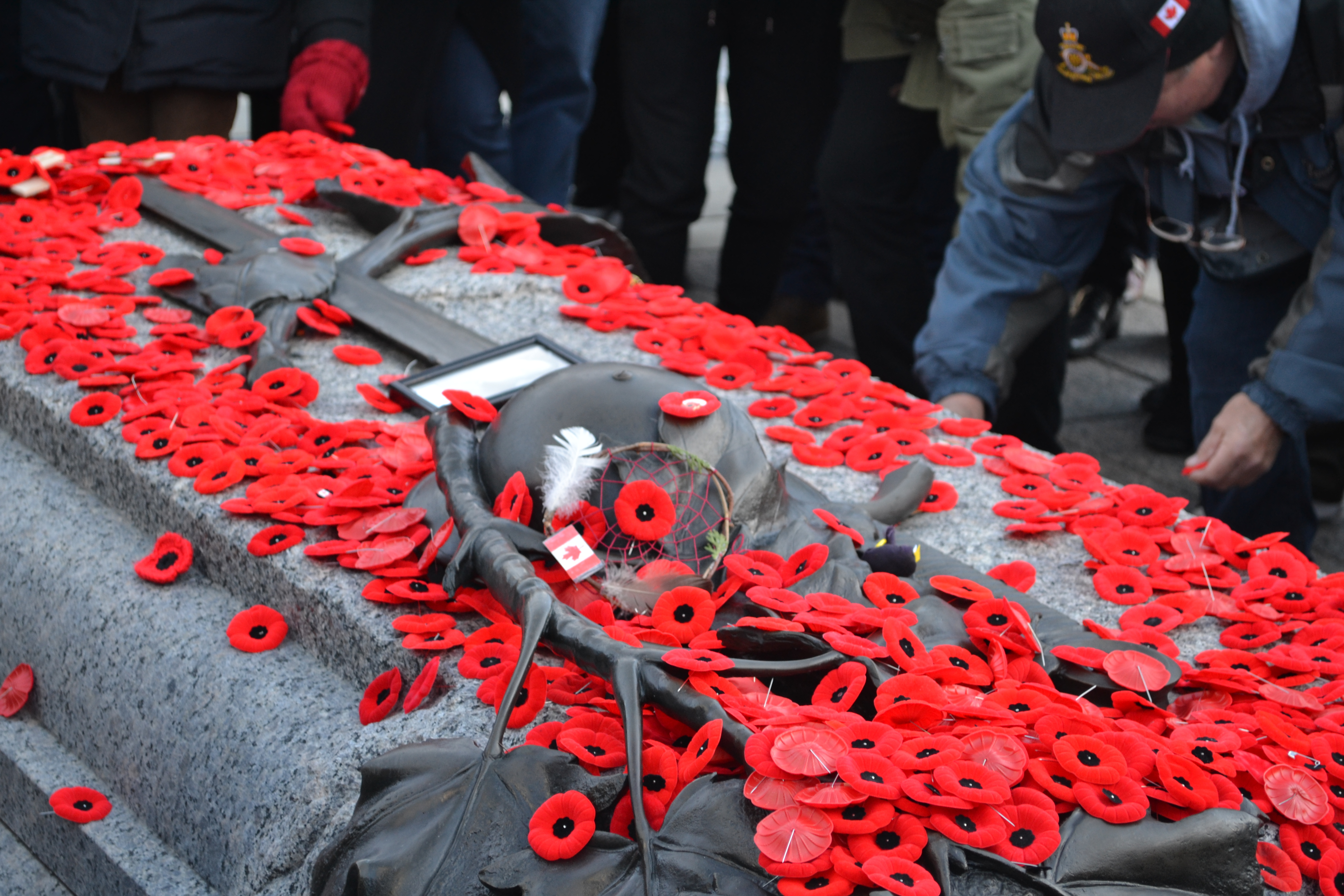
Remembrance poppies placed atop the Canadian Tomb of the Unknown Soldier after the Remembrance Day ceremony in Ottawa.

Following the 2000 installation of the Tomb of the Unknown Soldier at the National War Memorial in Ottawa, where the national Remembrance Service is held, a new tradition began of attendees laying their poppies on the tomb at the end of the service. While not part of the official program, the act has become widely practised elsewhere in the country, with others leaving cut flowers, photographs, or letters as well.

Since Newfoundland's incorporation into Canada in 1949, the remembrance poppy has largely displaced Newfoundland's own commemorative floral emblem, the forget-me-not. Although in recent years the forget-me-not has had somewhat of a resurgence in Newfoundland's military commemorations, the remembrance poppy remains more common.

=== New Zealand ===
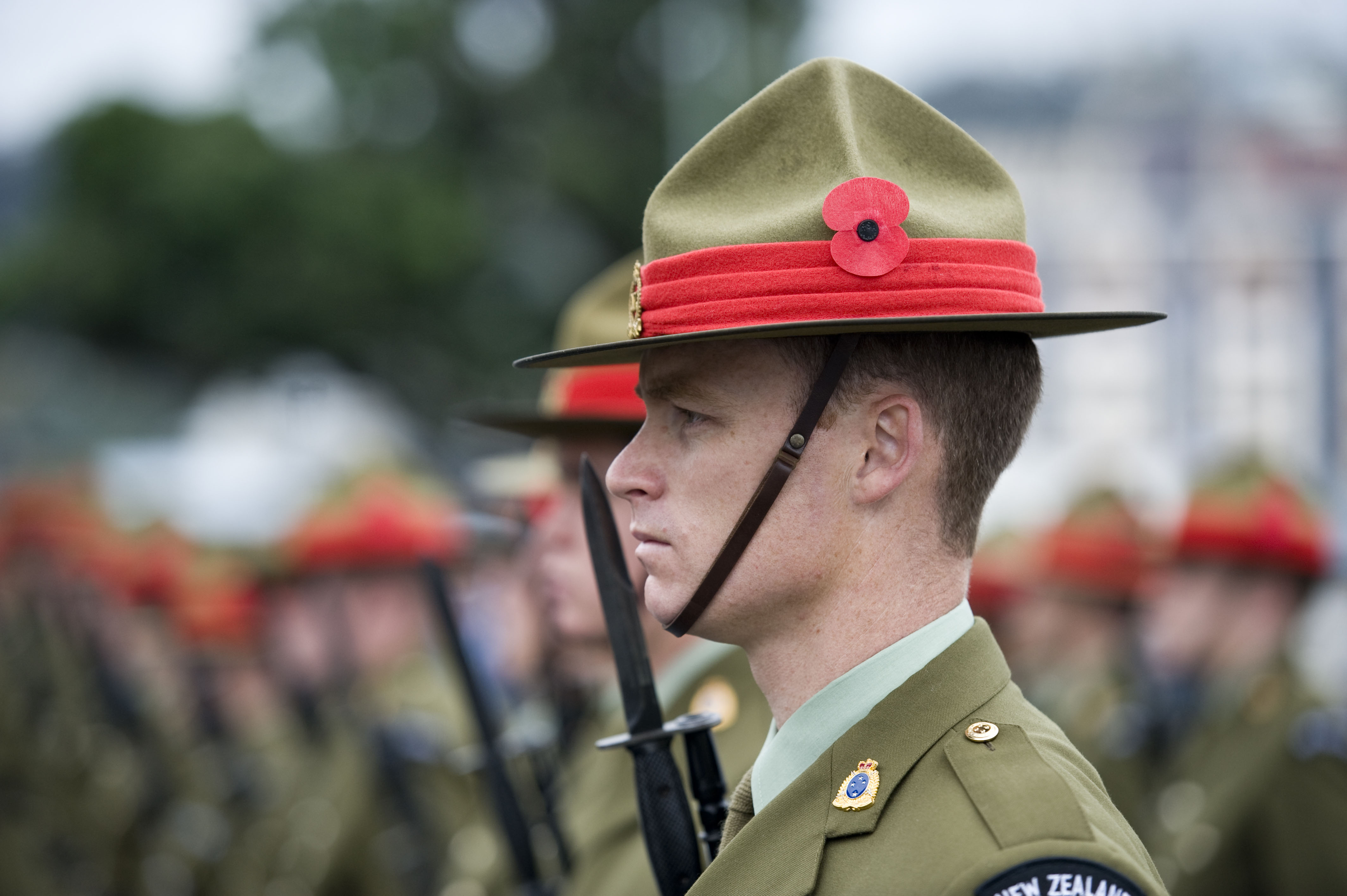
A remembrance poppy adorning a New Zealand service member's campaign hat.

Remembrance poppies are most often worn on Anzac Day (25 April) to commemorate New Zealand soldiers who died in war. They are also worn on Remembrance Day, and are sold by the Royal New Zealand Returned and Services' Association to raise funds. The RSA planned to hold its first Poppy Day appeal around the time of Armistice Day 1921, as other countries were doing, but the ship carrying the poppies from France arrived in New Zealand too late. The association therefore waited until Anzac Day 1922. This first Poppy Day appeal was a success. Most of the money raised went to needy soldiers and their families, while the rest went to the French Children's League to help relieve suffering in war-ravaged areas of northern France.

Following its introduction, the popularity of Poppy Day grew and there were record collections during World War II. By 1945, 750,000 poppies were distributed nationwide, an amount equal to half the country's population.

=== Pakistan ===
The 'Great War Company' holds a private ceremony on 11 November, where red poppies are worn by descendants of World War I veterans from the British Indian Army.

=== South Africa ===
Use of the remembrance poppy has risen in popularity in the 2000s. Interest in the remembrance poppy grew in 2011 after Charles, Prince of Wales visited the country in November 2011, with the South African Legion of Military Veterans seeing a spike in phone calls from people wanting to obtain poppies. That year, the South African Legion shipped over 300,000 poppies from Royal British Legion Poppy Factory.

=== United Kingdom ===
In England, Wales, and Northern Ireland, remembrance poppies are sold by The Royal British Legion (RBL) volunteers on the streets in the weeks before Remembrance Day. Remembrance poppies in Scotland are manufactured and distributed by the Earl Haig Fund Scotland or poppyscotland.

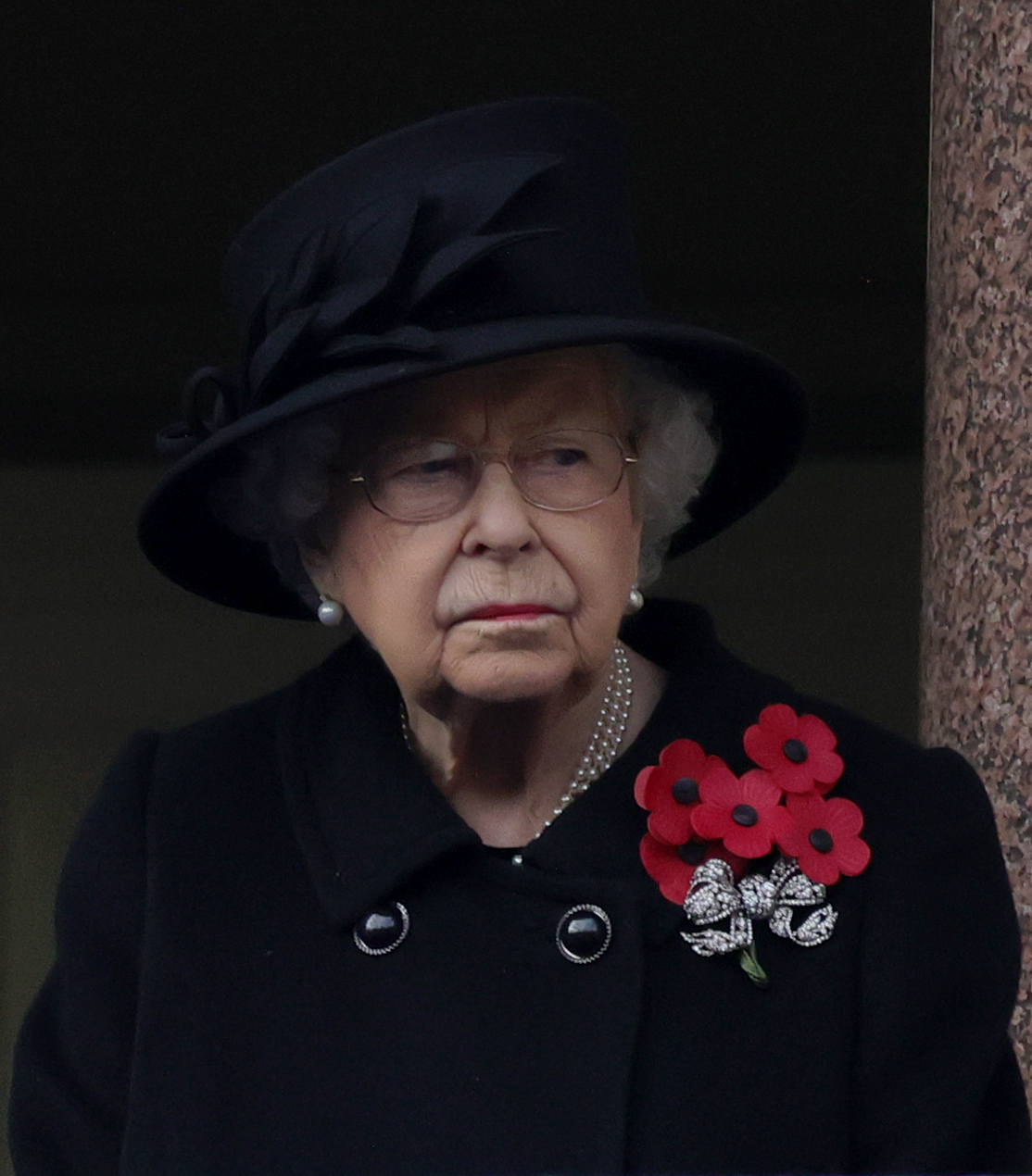
Queen Elizabeth II wearing a unique remembrance poppy design on Remembrance Sunday, 2020

For years after World War I, poppies were worn only on Remembrance Day. Today the RBL's "Poppy Appeal" has a higher profile than other charity appeals in the UK. The pins are widespread from mid-October until mid-November every year and are worn by the general public, politicians, the Royal Family and other public figures. Other awareness-raising events sometimes incorporate the poppy imagery. For example, in 2011, a Second World War aeroplane dropped 6,000 poppies over the town of Yeovil in Somerset. In 2014, Blood Swept Lands and Seas of Red, a public art installation, was created in the dry moat of the Tower of London by covering it with 888,246 ceramic poppies – one for each soldier of the British Empire killed in World War I.

==== Royal British Legion poppies ====
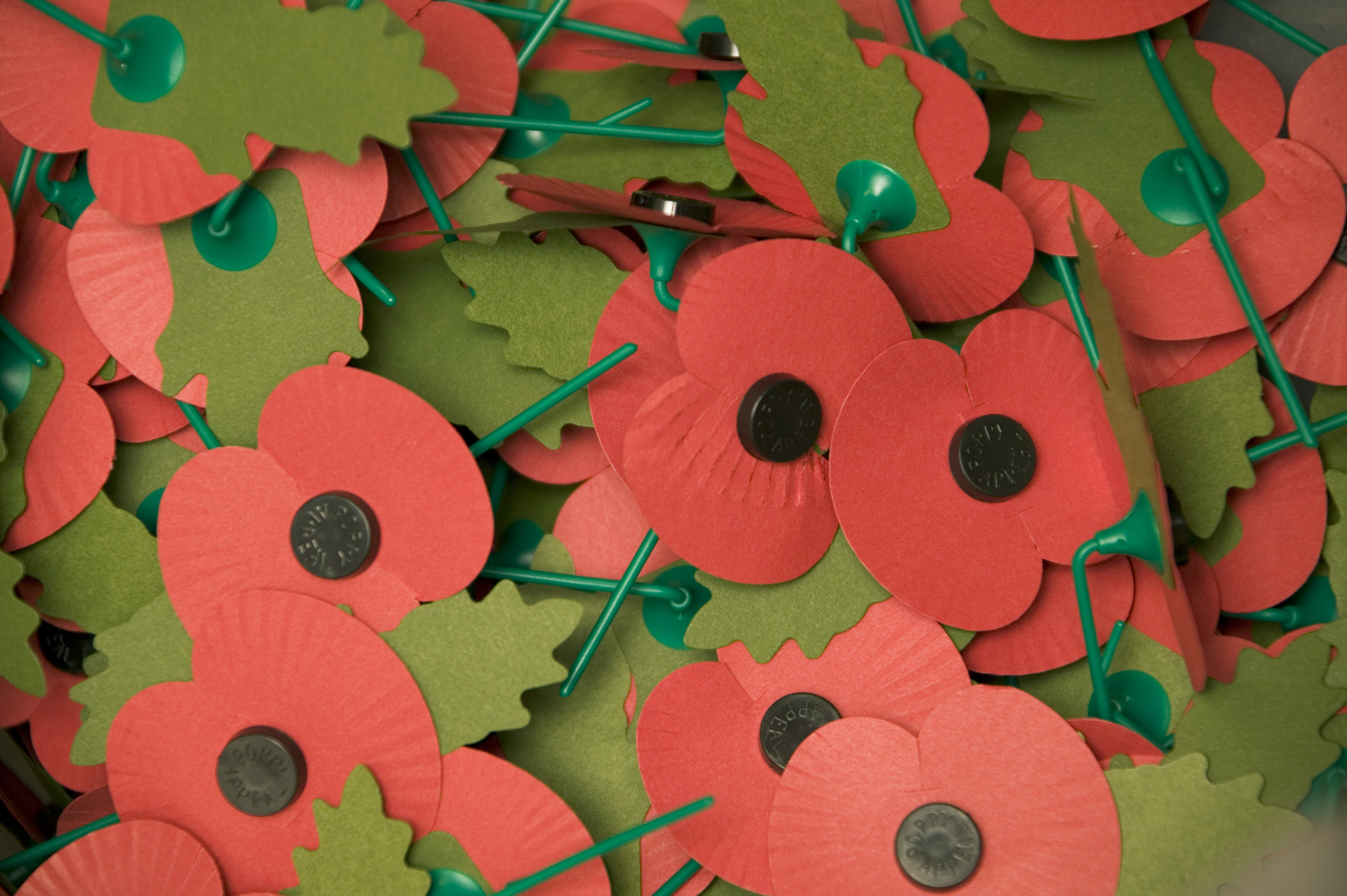
A pile of Royal British Legion remembrance poppies distributed in England, Wales, and Northern Ireland.

In England, Wales, and Northern Ireland, the poppies typically have two red paper petals mounted on a green plastic stem with a single green paper leaf and a prominent black plastic central boss. The stem has an additional branch used as a pin to anchor the poppy in the lapel or buttonhole. The yearly sale of poppies is a major source of income for the RBL in the UK. The poppy has no fixed price; it is sold for a donation or the price may be suggested by the seller. The black plastic centre of the poppy was marked "Haig Fund" until 1994 but is now marked "Poppy Appeal."

RBL poppies are produced by about 50 people, primarily disabled former British military personnel, who work year-round to assemble millions of poppies at the Poppy Factory in Richmond. In 2010, approximately 48 million poppies were shipped from the Poppy Factory, with 45 million poppies being distributed to England, Wales, and Northern Ireland. Three million poppies from the Poppy Factory were shipped to 120 countries, primarily to British ex-pat communities and British embassies.

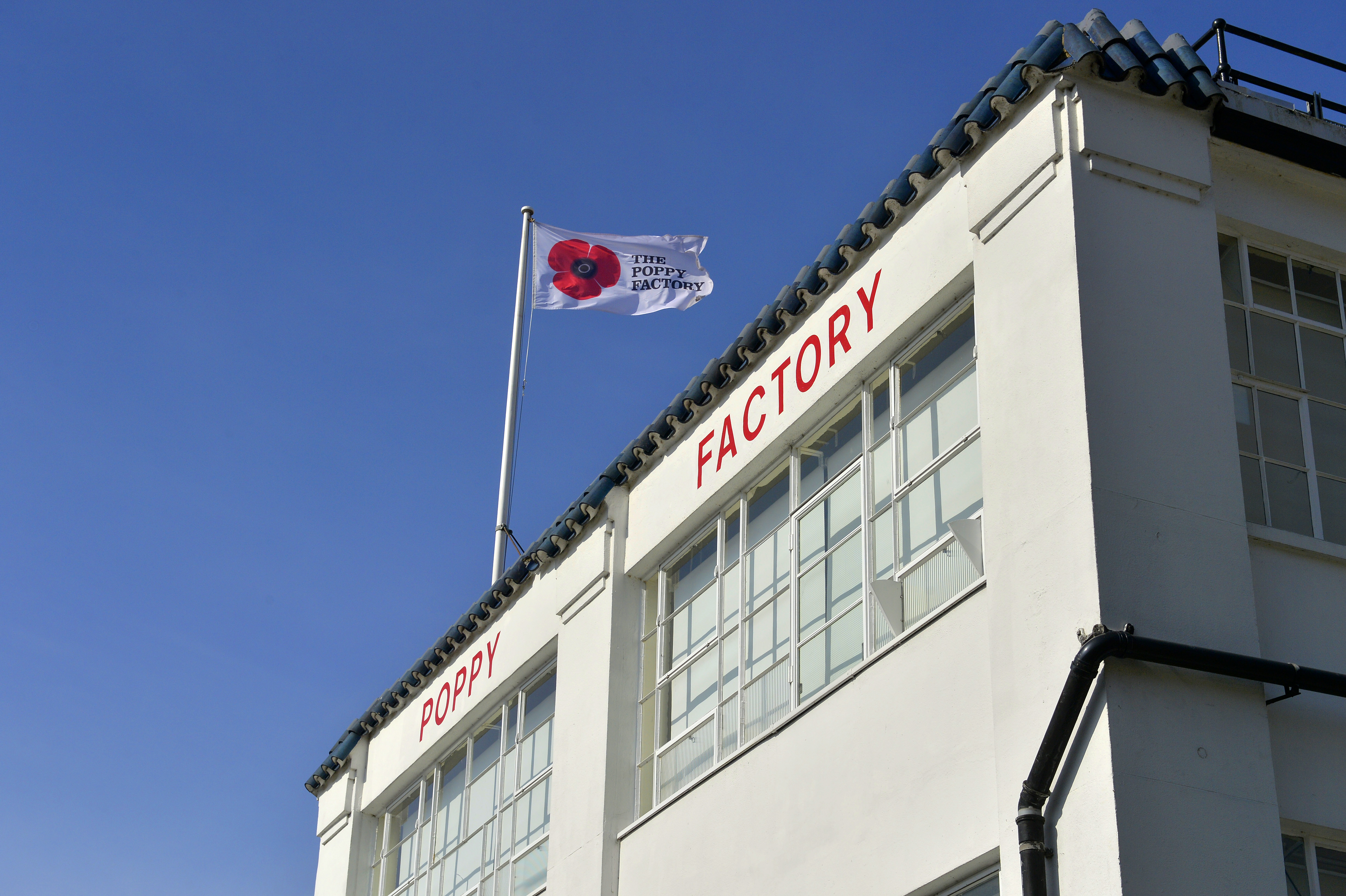
The exterior of the Poppy Factory, where Royal British Legion remembrance poppies are assembled.

Since 2000, the British remembrance poppy has been a trademark of The Royal British Legion. The RBL states, "The red poppy is our registered mark and its only lawful use is to raise funds for the Poppy Appeal". The organization says these poppies are "worn to commemorate the sacrifices of our Armed Forces and to show support to those still serving today." Other poppy merchandise is sold throughout the year as part of ongoing fundraising.

The Royal British Legion's Poppy Appeal has caused controversy in recent decades, with some—including British Army veterans—arguing that the symbol has been used excessively to marshal support for British military interventions and that public figures have been pressured to wear the poppies.

In 2014, a version of the anti-war song No Man’s Land (Green Fields Of France) was released, performed by Joss Stone, as part of the poppy appeal. It was criticised by Eric Bogle, the writer of the song, for omitting important verses about the horror of war. Critics called the song "syrupy" and "jingoistic".

==== Earl Haig Fund Scotland poppies ====
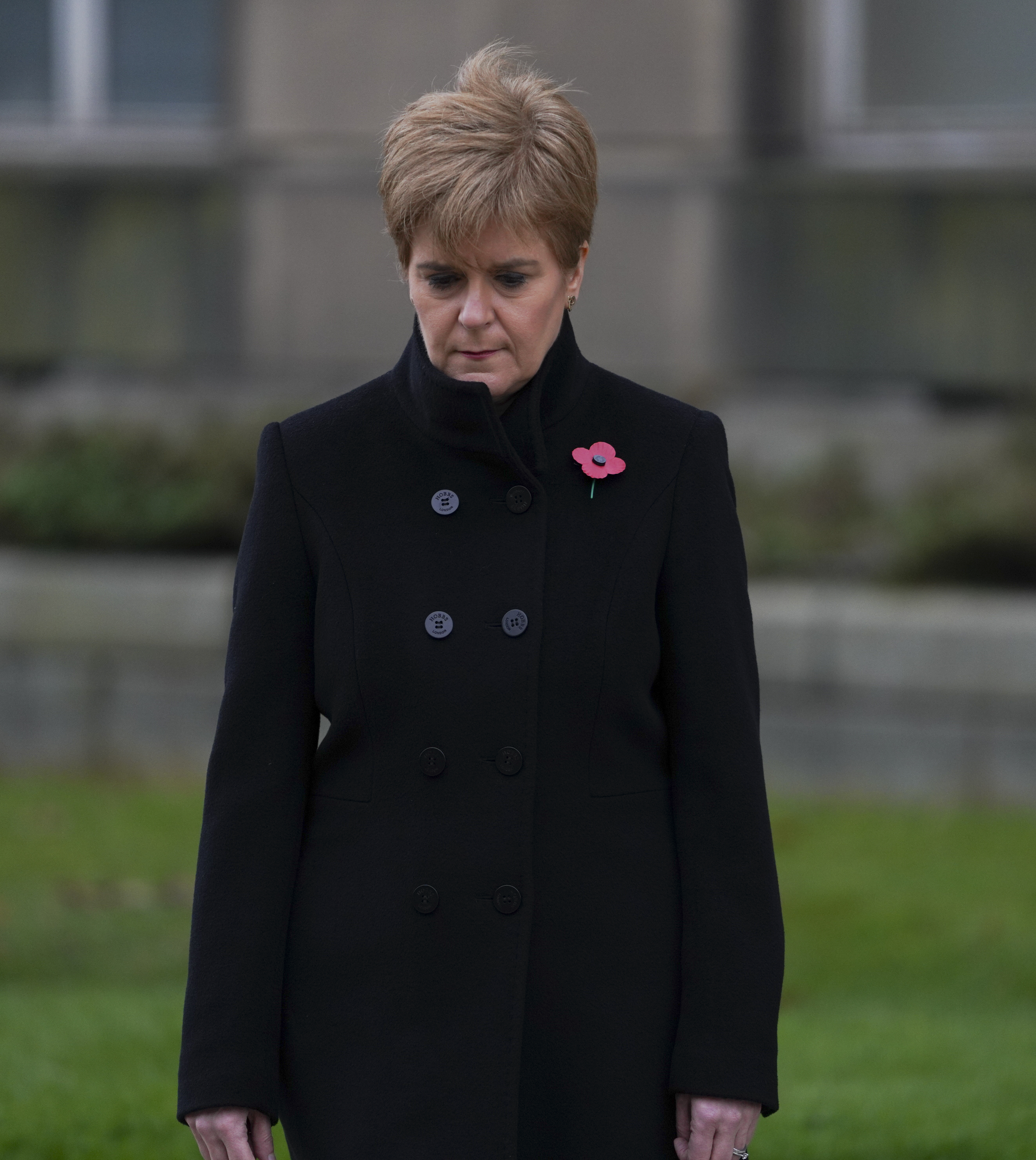
Nicola Sturgeon wearing a remembrance poppy distributed by the Earl Haig Fund Scotland, 2021. Note the lack of a leaf, a feature found on RBL remembrance poppies, but absent on Scottish poppies.

In Scotland, the poppies are produced and distributed by the Earl Haig Fund Scotland. Poppies produced by Earl Haig Fund Scotland appear slightly different from their RBL counterparts, with the Scottish poppy being curled with four petals and no leaf. Poppies distributed by the Earl Haig Fund Scotland are made at the Lady Haig's Poppy Factory in Edinburgh.

As of 2011, Poppyscotland reportedly distributes approximately five million poppies annually.

==== Issues in Northern Ireland ====
Although the Royal British Legion also holds a yearly poppy appeal in Northern Ireland and in 2009 raised more than £1 million, the wearing of poppies in Northern Ireland is controversial. It is seen by many as a political symbol and a symbol of Britishness, representing support for the British Army.

The poppy has long been the preserve of the unionist/loyalist community. Loyalist paramilitaries (such as the UVF and UDA) have also used poppies to commemorate their own members who were killed in The Troubles.

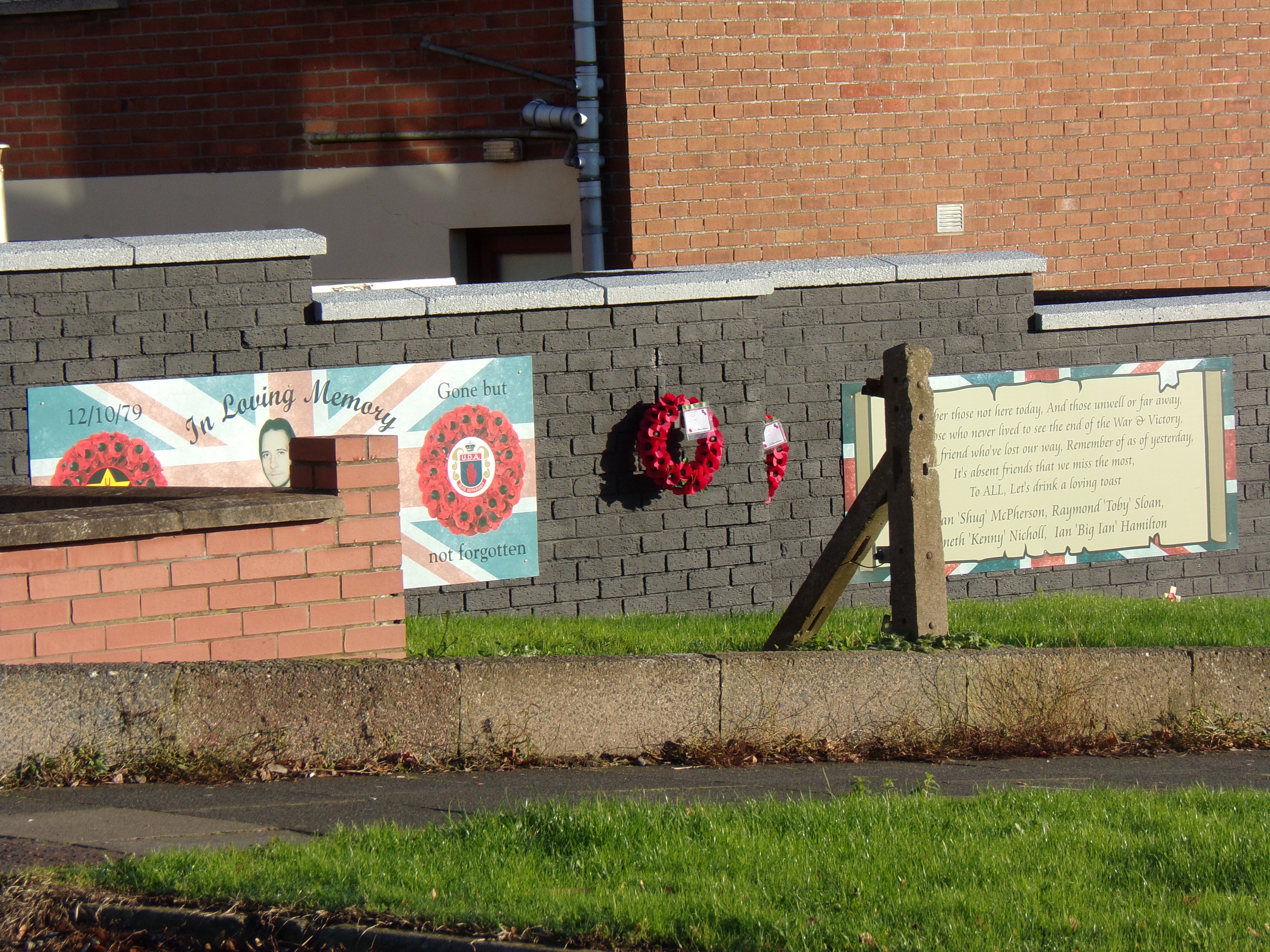
A memorial for the Ulster Defence Association in Larne that includes remembrance poppies.

Most Irish nationalists and republicans choose not to wear poppies; they regard the Poppy Appeal as supporting soldiers who killed civilians (for example on Bloody Sunday) or colluded with illegal loyalist paramilitaries (for example the Glenanne gang) during The Troubles. Irish nationalist groups, and victims' groups, have urged the BBC to end its policy that all presenters must wear poppies. They argue that it breaches impartiality and points out that political symbols are banned in workplaces in Northern Ireland. They also say that the BBC, as a publicly funded body, should broadly reflect the whole community. Likewise, the director of Relatives for Justice has condemned the wearing of poppies by police officers in Catholic neighbourhoods, calling it "repugnant and offensive to the vast majority of people within our community, given the role of the British Army". In the Irish Independent, it was claimed that "substantial amounts" of money raised from selling poppies are used "to build monuments to insane or inane generals or build old boys' clubs for the war elite". On Remembrance Day 2010 the SDLP's leader Margaret Ritchie was the first leader of a nationalist party to wear one.

=== Outside the Commonwealth ===
The Royal British Legion and Royal Canadian Legion also distribute remembrance poppies to several non-Commonwealth countries. In 2010, the Royal British Legion's Poppy Factory distributed three million poppies to over 120 countries, primarily to British expatriate communities and British embassies. The RBL also distributes remembrance poppies to their international branches, including their Hong Kong branch. Canadian remembrance poppies are also distributed at several embassies, including the Canadian embassy in South Korea.

==== Albania ====
In Albania, government representatives, including Prime Minister Edi Rama, wore remembrance poppies during the commemoration ceremonies for the 70th anniversary of Liberation Day.

==== Ireland ====
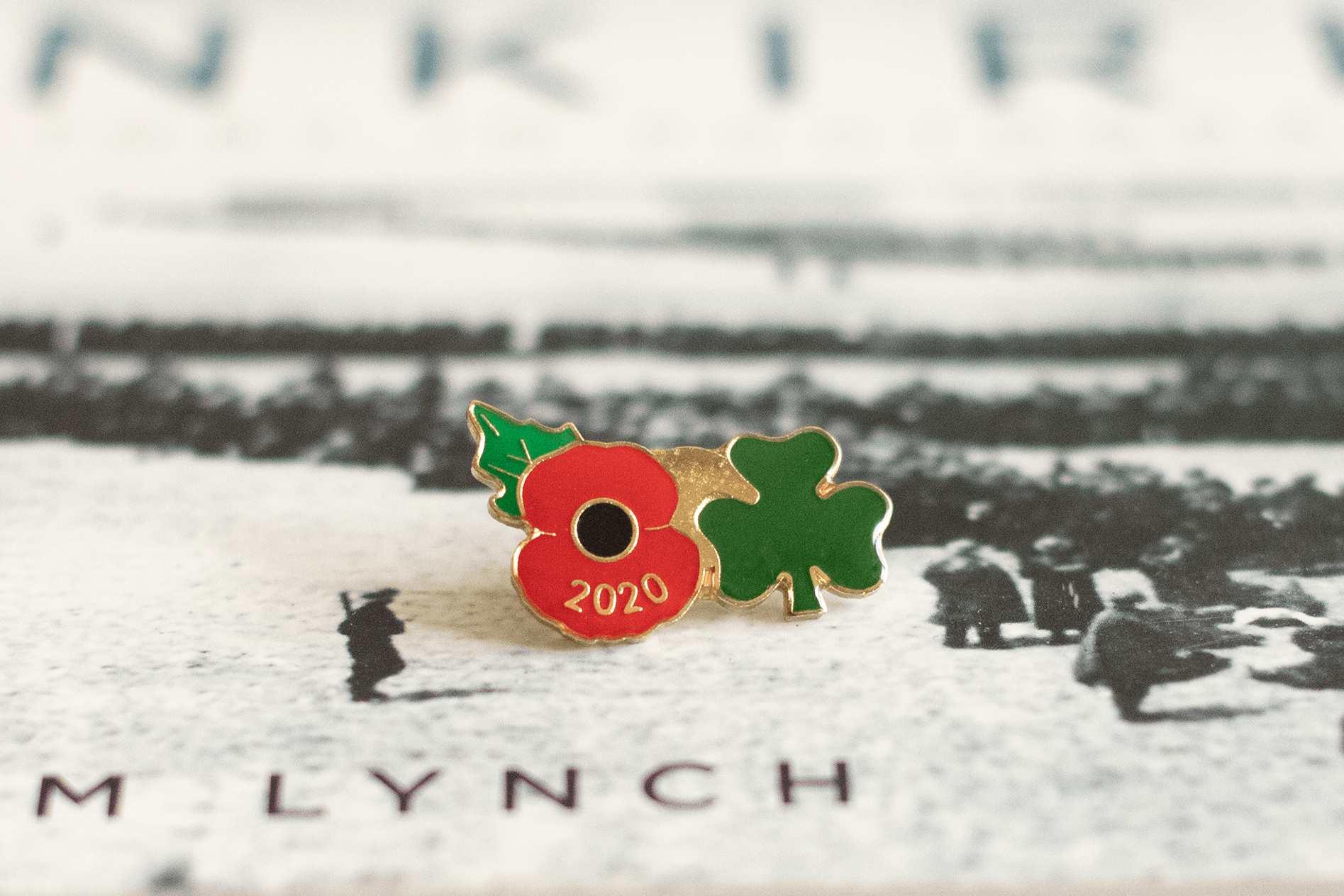
RBL Ireland "shamrock poppy" pin 2020

During World War I, all of Ireland was part of the United Kingdom and about 200,000 Irishmen fought in the British Army (see Ireland and World War I). During World War II, some 70,000 citizens of the Ireland, by then independent, served in the British armed forces, and a Roll of Honour in Trinity College Dublin lists 3,617 people from the Republic who died on active service in the war. The RBL has a branch in the Republic and holds a wreath-laying ceremony at St Patrick's Cathedral, Dublin, which the President of Ireland has attended.

The Republic has its own National Day of Commemoration in July for all Irish people who died in war. As in other non-Commonwealth countries, poppies are not often worn and are not part of the main commemorations. This is partly due to the British Army's role in fighting against Irish independence, some of its actions during the War of Independence and its role in Northern Ireland during the Troubles.

In the years following the War of Independence, the poppy was particularly controversial, with Irish nationalists seeing it as a provocative symbol of British imperialism. In Dublin, British Legion marchers often had poppies snatched from their lapels, which led to street fights. In response, some poppy-wearers hid razor blades in their poppies. According to historian Donal Fallon, "as the 1930s progressed, 'Poppy Day' lost much of its violent edge in Dublin, but the wearing of the symbol also became less commonplace in subsequent decades".

In 2017, Leo Varadkar was the first Taoiseach to wear a "shamrock poppy" in the Dáil.

==== Palestine ====
According to Nasser Abufarha, the poppy flower been used in popular Palestinian representations to symbolize the blood in the land of the Fida'i, the "heroic warrior sacrificer"; the Shahid, the "victim youth sacrificer"; or the Istishhadi, "moving the Shahid from victim to hero and asserting the intentionality of the sacrifice." Abufarha describes these figures as icons of the "three distinct periods in the contemporary Palestinian resistance to Israeli occupation and rule," referring to the guerrilla warfare of the Palestinian fedayeen in the 1960s and 70s, the First Intifada (1987–93), and the Second Intifada (2000–05)—the blood and sacrifice of all of whom Palestinians have represented with the poppy.

In popular Palestinian narrative dating back to Canaanite and Phoenician times, the red color of flower's petals is from the blood of martyrs in the land. The narrative is related to the story of the Greek mythological figure Adonis, a boy representing the ideal of male beauty who was killed by a wild boar in the forests of Lebanon and whose blood nourished the land from which the red anemone grew. Abufarha notes that the flower thus came to represent "renewal, resurrection, and life." It has appeared in Palestinian protest art, especially as a symbol of sacrifice or return.

==== South Korea ====
Remembrance poppies are usually used for the Remembrance Day ceremony at United Nations Memorial Cemetery in Busan to honour Korean War veterans from Korea and UN Force members. Wearing poppies was introduced by Vincent Courtenay, a Canadian veteran of the conflict.

==== Ukraine ====
Never Again symbol from Ukraine

Since 2014, Ukrainians have worn the poppy as a symbol of the victory over Nazism and commemoration of the victims of World War II. It has largely replaced the Ribbon of Saint George, which became associated with pro-Russian separatists and Russian military aggression. A poppy logo was designed by Serhiy Mishakin and contains the text "1939–1945 Never Again".

==== United States ====
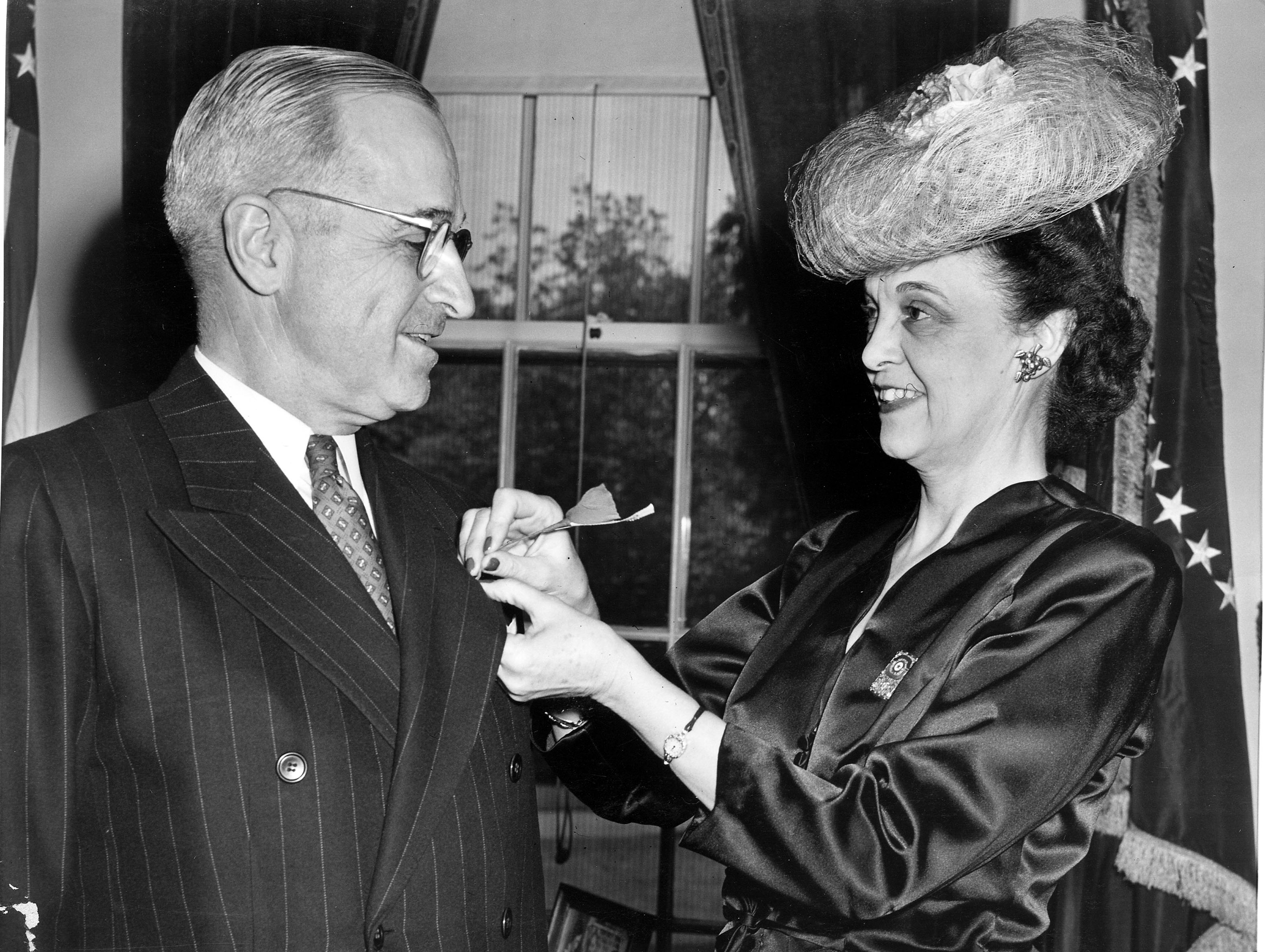
A remembrance poppy being presented to U.S. President Harry S. Truman from the president of the American Legion Auxiliary.

In the United States, the Veterans of Foreign Wars conducted the first nationwide distribution of remembrance poppies before Memorial Day in 1922. The poppy was named the official flower of the American Legion 27 September 1920, although the legion only began their own national distribution program of remembrance poppies in 1924. The American Legion Auxiliary distributes crepe-paper poppies and then requests a donation, around Memorial Day and Veterans Day (National Poppy Day, the Friday before Memorial Day).

Use of remembrance poppies in the U.S. has diminished since their introduction in the 1920s, although remembrance poppies are sometimes worn on Memorial Day. On Veterans Day, a red, white, and blue ribbon was a more common lapel adornment by the early 2010s.

== Cultural adoption of the symbol ==
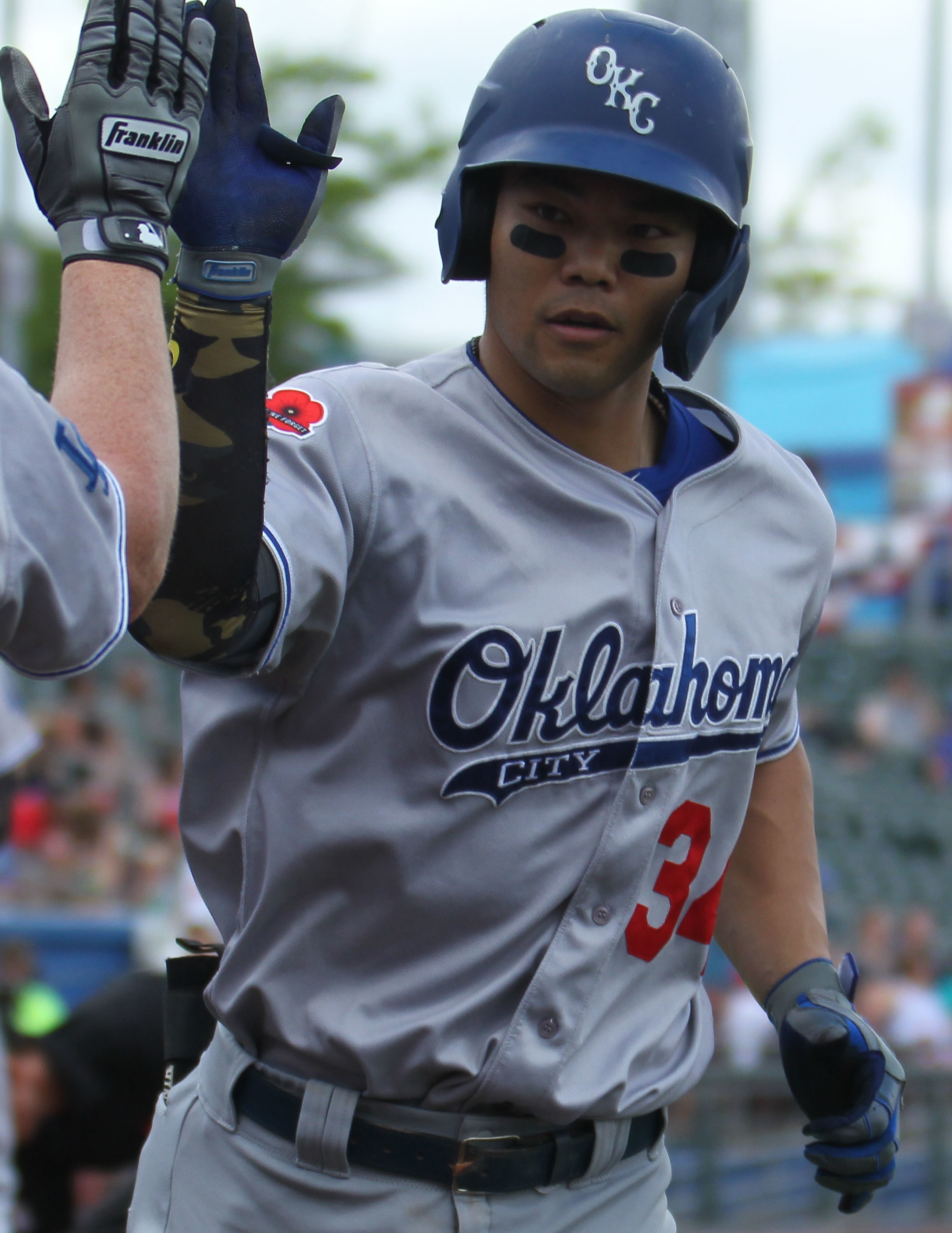
An Oklahoma City Dodgers baseball player with a remembrance poppy shoulder patch on his uniform in commemoration of Memorial Day

To commemorate Remembrance Day, several professional sports leagues have emblazoned the remembrance poppy symbol onto their uniforms. Many British professional football clubs create special edition kits with the remembrance poppy featured on their shirts. Canadian professional and junior ice hockey teams wear remembrance poppy sticker emblems on their helmets. Remembrance poppy patches are also worn by American Major League and Minor League Baseball teams, although these are worn to commemorate Memorial Day in May, as opposed to Remembrance Day.

In 2007, Air Canada emblazoned 20 of its jets with the remembrance poppy symbol in partnership with the Royal Canadian Legion.

== Controversy and protest ==
=== In Canada ===
In November 2016, Air Canada released an internal memo that "strongly encouraged" its staff not to wear poppies while in uniform. After several hours of employee and union pushback, a second memo was distributed, reversing the earlier position and stating that the "wearing of poppies is supported" by the company.

In November 2019, Don Cherry, a prominent ice hockey pundit known for his appearances on Hockey Night in Canada, made a controversial complaint on-air that he rarely saw people he believed were new immigrants to Toronto wearing a remembrance poppy. His remarks caused widespread condemnation from the ice hockey community, and several complaints were filed against him through the Canadian Broadcast Standards Council. Cherry was later fired by Sportsnet for his comments.

In November 2020, U.S.-based grocer Whole Foods Market briefly banned its employees from wearing remembrance poppies at its 14 Canadian locations, as they did not conform to the company's updated uniform policy of not wearing symbols that were "supporting a cause". Whole Foods reversed its decision on the poppy several days later after receiving complaints from Prime Minister Justin Trudeau, veteran affairs minister Lawrence MacAulay, Ontario Premier Doug Ford, and several Royal Canadian Legion branches.

=== In the United Kingdom ===
In 1993, The Royal British Legion complained that Cannon Fodder, a video game with an anti-war message, had planned to use a poppy on its cover. The Legion, along with some politicians, called it "offensive to millions" and "monstrous". The cover was changed before the game was released.

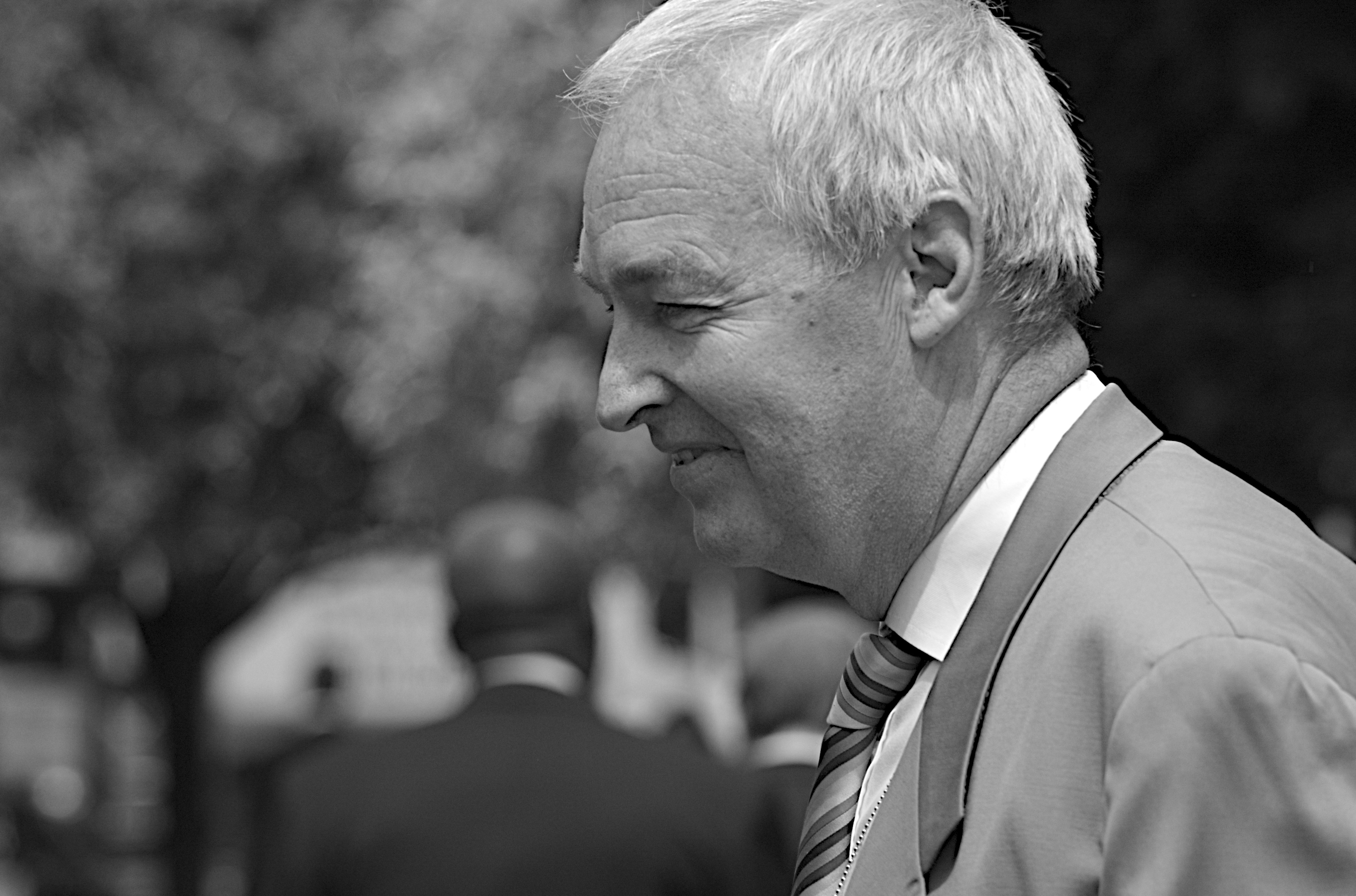
Jon Snow in 2007. The Channel 4 newsreader caused controversy in 2006 after he described the pressure to wear a remembrance poppy as "poppy fascism".

Within the United Kingdom, there has been growing controversy over the Poppy Appeal. Some—including a few British Army veterans—have argued that the Poppy Appeal has become excessive, that it has been used to marshal support for British military activities, and that poppy wearing has become seen as compulsory for public figures. In 2006, Channel 4 newsreader Jon Snow described the pressure to wear a poppy as "poppy fascism". Columnist Dan O'Neill wrote in 2011 that "presenters and politicians seem to compete in a race to be first – poppies start sprouting in mid-October while the absence of a poppy is interpreted as absence of concern for the war dead, almost as an unpatriotic act of treachery." Likewise, Jonathan Bartley of the religious think-tank Ekklesia said "Public figures in Britain are urged, indeed in many cases, required, to wear ... the red poppy, almost as an article of faith. There is a political correctness about the red poppy." Journalist Robert Fisk complained in 2011 that the poppy had become a seasonal "fashion accessory" and that people were "ostentatiously wearing a poppy for social or work-related reasons, to look patriotic when it suited them."

In 2010, a group of British Army veterans issued an open letter complaining that the Poppy Appeal had become excessive and garish, that it was being used to marshal support behind British military interventions, and that people were being pressured into wearing poppies. In 2014, the same group protested by holding an alternative remembrance service: they walked to the Cenotaph under the banner "Never Again" with a wreath of white poppies to acknowledge civilians killed in war. Their tops bore the message "War is Organised Murder", a quote from Harry Patch, one of the last surviving veterans of World War I.

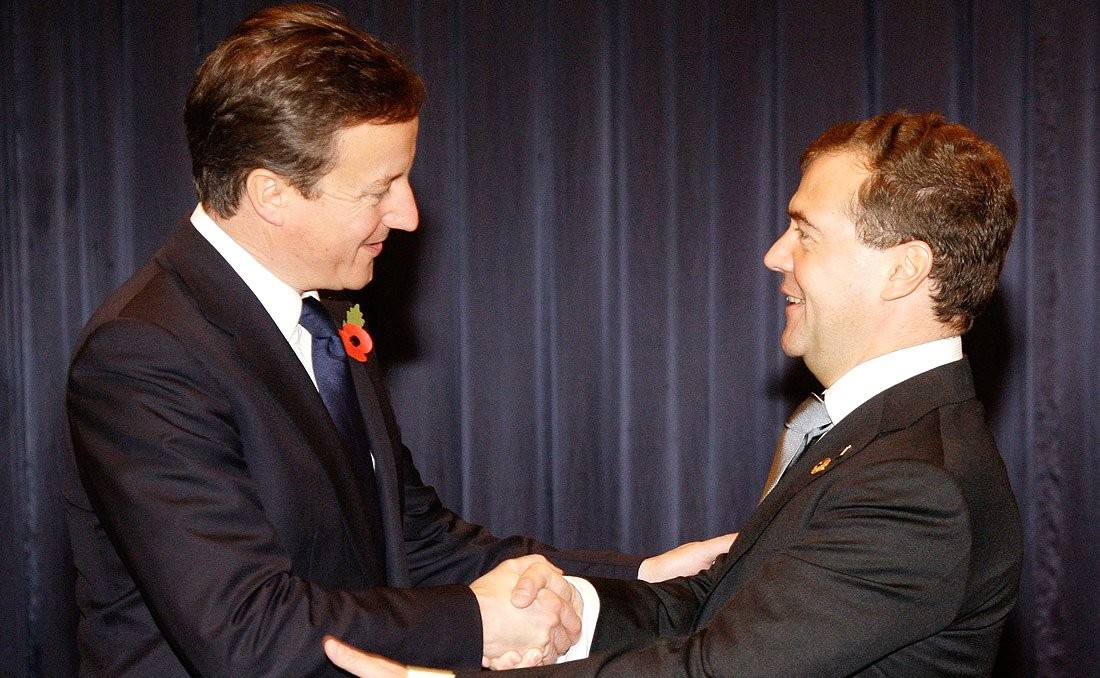
British Prime Minister David Cameron wearing a remembrance poppy in 2010.

British Prime Minister David Cameron rejected a request from Chinese officials to remove his poppy during his visit to Beijing on Remembrance Day in 2010. The officials had deemed the poppy offensive because they assumed it to be connected with the Opium Wars of the mid-19th century.

A 2010 Remembrance Day ceremony in London was disrupted by members of the extremist Muslims Against Crusades group, who were protesting against the British military presence in Afghanistan and Iraq. They burnt large poppies and chanted "British soldiers burn in hell" during the two-minute silence. Two of the men were arrested and charged for threatening behavior. One was convicted and fined £50. The same group planned to hold another protest in 2011, but was banned by the Home Secretary the day before the planned protest. In 2014, a campaign was begun to encourage Muslim women to wear poppy hijabs. Some criticised it as a "shrouded loyalty test" implying that Muslims needed to prove their loyalty to Britain. Some far-right groups have used the poppy as a symbol of militant British nationalism, while some British Muslims have begun to reject it, seeing the poppy as a "symbol of Western imperialism".

In November 2011, people were arrested in Northern Ireland after a picture of two youths burning a poppy was posted on Facebook. The picture was reported to police by a member of the RBL. The following year, a young Canterbury man was arrested for allegedly posting a picture of a burning poppy on Facebook, on suspicion of an offence under the Malicious Communications Act.

In 2012, The Northern Whig public house in Belfast refused entry to a man wearing a remembrance poppy. Although the owners apologised, the customer took the matter to court, supported by the Equality Commission for Northern Ireland (ECNI). The case was significant for the decision supporting the view of the ECNI that "the poppy, although not directly linked to a specific religious belief or political opinion, would historically have been associated to a greater extent with the Protestant or unionist community in Northern Ireland".

In 2018, The Independent reported that both the Royal British Legion and Lady Haig's Poppy Factory had, since 2015, held contracts with One3One Solutions, the commercial arm of the Ministry of Justice, for prisoners at HM Prison Ford to manufacture the plastic central button and green stem of the poppies, for which they earned on average £10 a week. The RBL also confirmed that it had a contract with HM Prison Whitemoor for the refurbishment by inmates of its collecting tins, buckets, trays and boxes. The executive director of the charity War on Want described the use of inmate labour in the production poppies as the "exploitation of cheap labour", and Faith Spear, former member of the Independent Monitoring Board at Hollesey Bay prison, describing the repetitive and unskilled manual labour typically involved in prison labour as "mind numbing" and "akin to mental torture".

==== In media ====
In the British media, public figures have been attacked for not wearing poppies. British journalist and newsreader Charlene White has faced racist and sexist abuse for not wearing a poppy on-screen. She explained "I prefer to be neutral and impartial on screen so that one of those charities doesn't feel less favoured than another". Newsreader Jon Snow does not wear a poppy on-screen for similar reasons. He too was criticised and he condemned what he saw as "poppy fascism". Well-known war-time journalist Robert Fisk published in November 2011 a personal account about the shifting nature of wearing a poppy, titled "Do those who flaunt the poppy on their lapels know that they mock the war dead?". While all newsreaders in the UK are expected to wear the remembrance poppy, those on the BBC World News service are told not to. The BBC say this is because the symbol is not widely recognised overseas. The Royal British Legion condemned this, insisting that the poppy is the "international symbol of remembrance".

In a November 2020 episode of Jeremy Vine, activist Femi Oluwole questioned why BBC presenters were still permitted to wear poppies, following new impartiality guidance warning against "virtue signalling, no matter how worthy the cause", which had previously prevented staff from expressing support for Black Lives Matter and LGBT rights.

==== In sport ====
In the run-up to Remembrance Day, it has become common for UK football teams to play with artificial poppies sewn to their shirts, at the request of the Royal British Legion. This has caused some controversy.

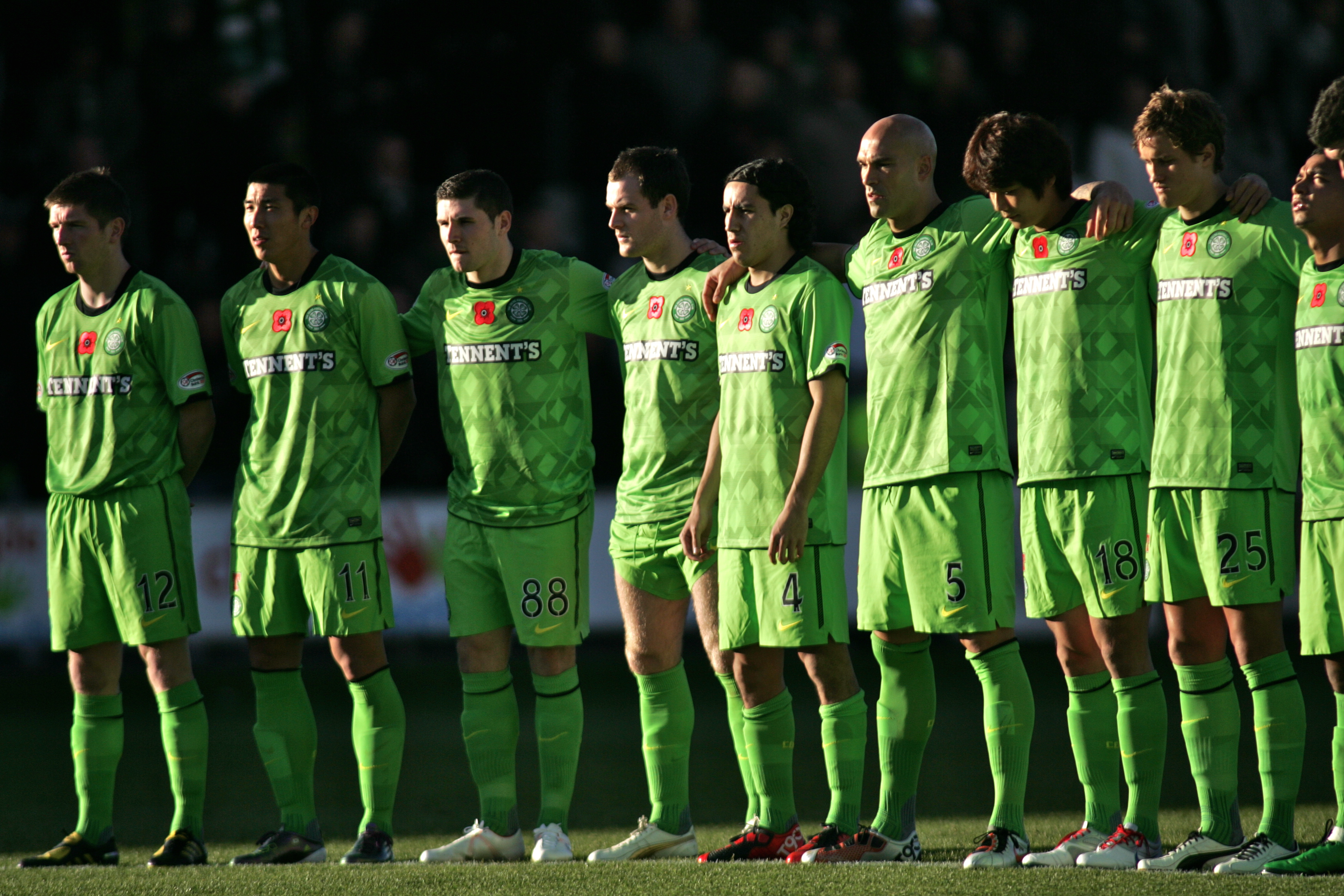
Football clubs commonly wear jerseys with a poppy emblazoned on, as Celtic controversially did in 2010.

At a Celtic v Aberdeen match in November 2010, a group of Celtic supporters, called the Green Brigade, unfurled a large banner in protest at the team wearing poppies. In a statement, it said: "Our group and many within the Celtic support do not recognise the British Armed Forces as heroes, nor their role in many conflicts as one worthy of our remembrance". It gave Operation Banner (Northern Ireland), the Afghanistan War and the Iraq War as examples.

Irish footballer James McClean, who has played for several English teams, has received death threats and abuse since 2012 for refusing to wear a poppy on his shirt during matches. McClean said he does not wear one because the Poppy Appeal supports British soldiers who served in Northern Ireland, and he believes it would disrespect those killed in his hometown, Derry, on Bloody Sunday.

In November 2011, it was proposed that the England football team should wear poppies on their shirts in a match against Spain. FIFA turned down the proposal; their decision was criticised by Prince William. FIFA subsequently allowed the English, Scottish and Welsh teams to wear poppies on black armbands.

On 11 November 2017, the third day of the test cricket match held at North Sydney Oval as part of the Women's Ashes, the Australia and England players wore poppies to mark 99 years since the end of World War I.

During the 2018 FIFA World Cup Qualifiers, the England, Scotland, Wales and Northern Ireland football teams were fined for displaying the poppy during matches. FIFA rules forbid the display of "political or religious symbols". The decision was strongly criticised by prime minister Theresa May, and the Welsh and English football associations appealed against the fine, with the English Football Association threatening to bring the matter to the Court of Arbitration for Sport.

In November 2018, Manchester United's Serbian midfielder Nemanja Matić refused to wear a poppy on his shirt for a match against Bournemouth. After the match, Matić was castigated and received threats from a number of people via social media. Matić stated that he would not wear a poppy because his village of Vrelo was hit by the NATO bombing of Yugoslavia in 1999.

== Other commemorative poppies ==
=== White poppies ===
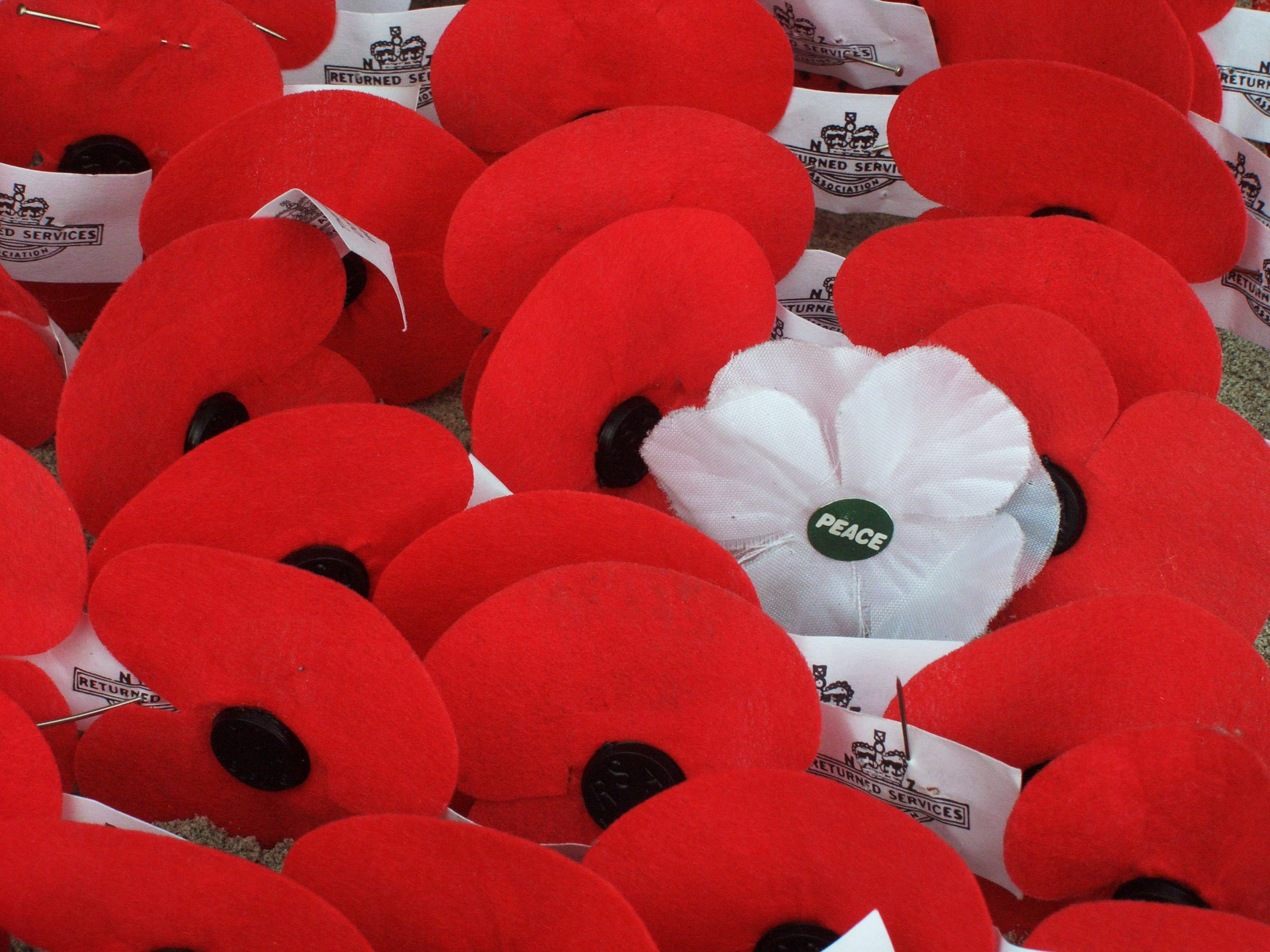
A white remembrance poppy left on Anzac Day in New Zealand, 2009

Some people choose to wear white poppies as an alternative to the red poppy. The white poppy and white poppy wreaths were introduced by Britain's Co-operative Women's Guild in 1933. Today, white poppies are sold by Peace Pledge Union or may be home-made. The white poppy is worn alone or alongside the red poppy. According to the Peace Pledge Union, it symbolises remembrance of all casualties of war, including civilian and non-British casualties, to stand for peace, and not to glamorise war. Some women in the 1930s lost their jobs for wearing white poppies, with some veterans having felt that the white poppy undermined their contribution and the lasting meaning of the red poppy. The Royal British Legion has stated it has no objection to the white poppy being worn alongside the red poppy.

=== Black poppies ===
On Remembrance Sunday 1999, a Merseyside group protesting against sanctions and war on Iraq laid a wreath of black poppies on the cenotaph in Liverpool. In 2014 the black poppy was embraced as an anti-war symbol by the Stop the War Coalition which reported 'anti militarists' in Glasgow distributing 16,000 black poppies in memory of World War I conscientious objectors.

In 2010, a different initiative proposed the use of a "Black Poppy Rose" that was "created to be a symbol that represents the contributions made by the African/Black/West Indian/Caribbean/Pacific Islands & Indigenous communities to various wars since the 16th century". The symbol was worn in 2023 around the time of Remembrance Day by King Charles III.

=== Khadi poppies ===
Introduced in the 2018 centenary year by Jitesh Gadhia and the Royal British Legion, the khadi poppy is intended to represent specific gratitude for the contribution of 1.5 million people from undivided India, as well as Commonwealth nations more generally, to the First World War. These poppies are identical to the Legion red poppy except the petals are made of khadi, a spun cotton cloth popularised by Mahatma Gandhi on his spinning wheel. Jitesh Gadhia has stated that "the khadi poppy is a hugely symbolic and highly appropriate gesture to recognise the outsized contribution of Indian soldiers during WWI." It has been worn by British Prime Minister Theresa May, and by cricketers Joe Root and Virat Kohli before a test match between England and India in September 2018.

=== Purple poppies ===
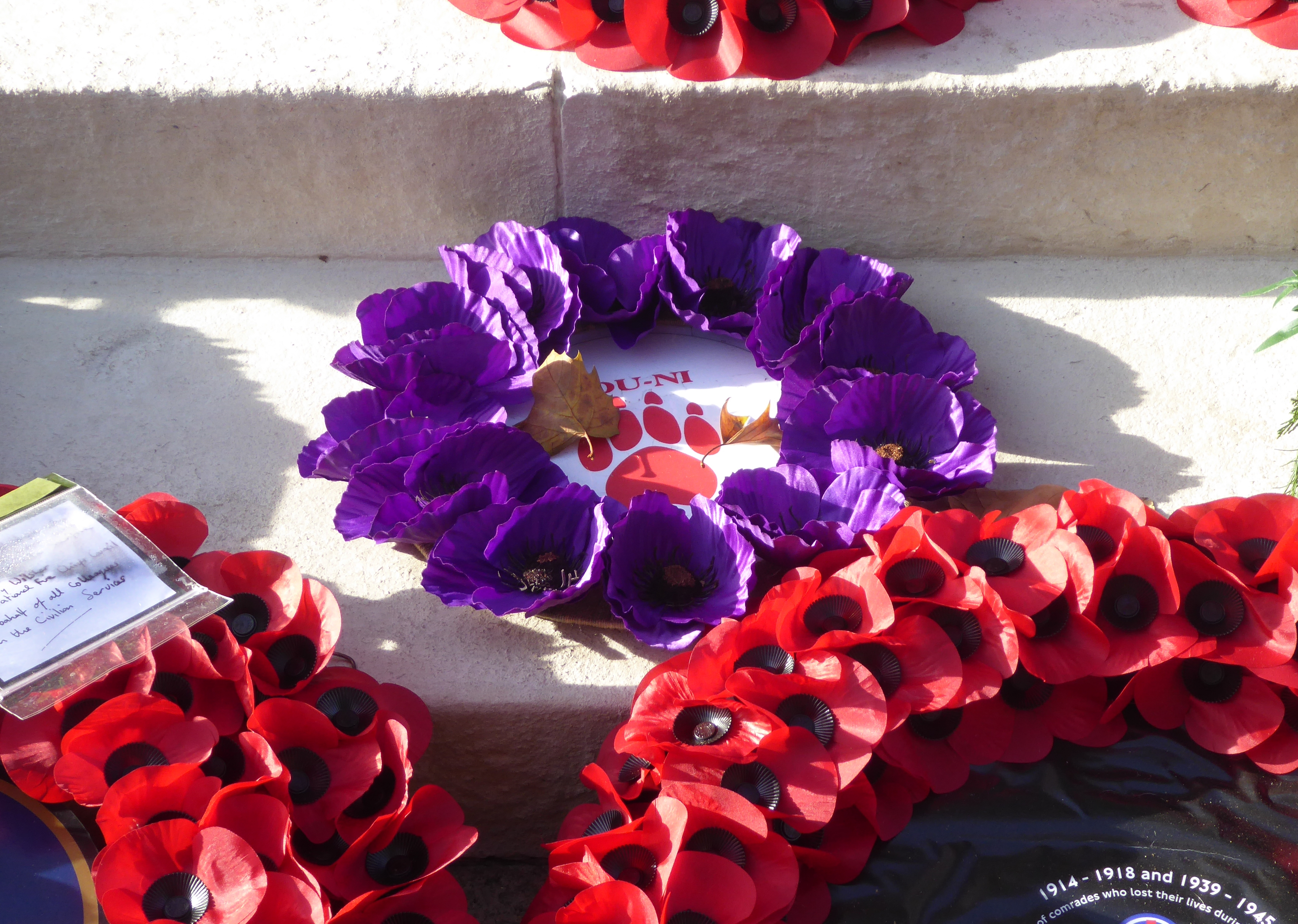
A wreath made of purple poppies laid at the Cenotaph in London

To commemorate animal victims of war, Animal Aid in Britain has issued a purple remembrance poppy, which can be worn alongside the traditional red one, as a reminder that both humans and animals have been – and continue to be – victims of war. The purple poppy was replaced by a purple paw symbol that can be worn all year round. This was because people saw the poppy as implying animals had given their lives as heroes in the service of human beings, whereas Animal Aid regards animals as having their lives taken by the abuse of humans in war.

=== Rainbow poppies ===
In 2019, a listing appeared on eBay in the United Kingdom selling LGBTQ rainbow poppies. The Royal British Legion stated that the rainbow poppy was not endorsed by them. While the eBay listing stated that the money raised by sales of the rainbow poppy would "go towards helping charity", it was not clear which charities would benefit from sales. This led to widespread criticism online, with some accusing the seller of "hijacking" the poppy appeal. Supporters of the poppy responded by tweeting examples of famous LGBTQ people who had played a significant role in conflicts, such as Alan Turing. The listing was removed by the original user, due to negative feedback.

As of 2024, the British Legion began to sell authorised "Pride Poppies", which consisted of the Progress Pride flag next to the traditional red poppy. Their sale sparked controversy in 2026, after Joseph Boam, a Reform UK Councillor in Leicestershire accused the Royal British Legion of “politicising remembrance” by including the Pride Flag. The British Legion responded saying the poppy was created to "support those who have faced discrimination or marginalisation due to their sexual orientation or gender identity, particularly those who served under the pre-2000 ban on LGBT personnel in the British Armed Forces".

=== Palestinian poppies ===
In 2026 Abdul Qader Ismail, an NHS paediatrician and children's picture book author, began selling a pin depicting a poppy in the colours of the Palestinian flag on eBay. Ismail said he chose the poppy because he considered it a symbol "beloved in the West" and believed Western countries had played an integral role in Palestinian suffering. He also argued that its associations with remembrance and peace made it an appropriate symbol of remembrance for Palestinians.

Proceeds from the sales were intended to support organisations and charities "working to end the occupation" of Palestinian territories. The Guardian reported that Friends of al-Aqsa was among the organisations receiving donations from the sales. The organisation describes itself as an NGO "demanding political change for Palestine" and was described in a 2024 report commissioned by the Home Office as "far-Left and Islamist". It was also banned from a fringe event at the Labour Party conference in September 2026 following a backlash.

UK veterans' groups and politicians, including Reform UK leader Nigel Farage, Conservative Shadow Defence Minister David Reed and Shadow Minister for War Readiness Stuart Anderson, accused Ismail of "hijacking" the message of Remembrance Day.

== Gallery ==
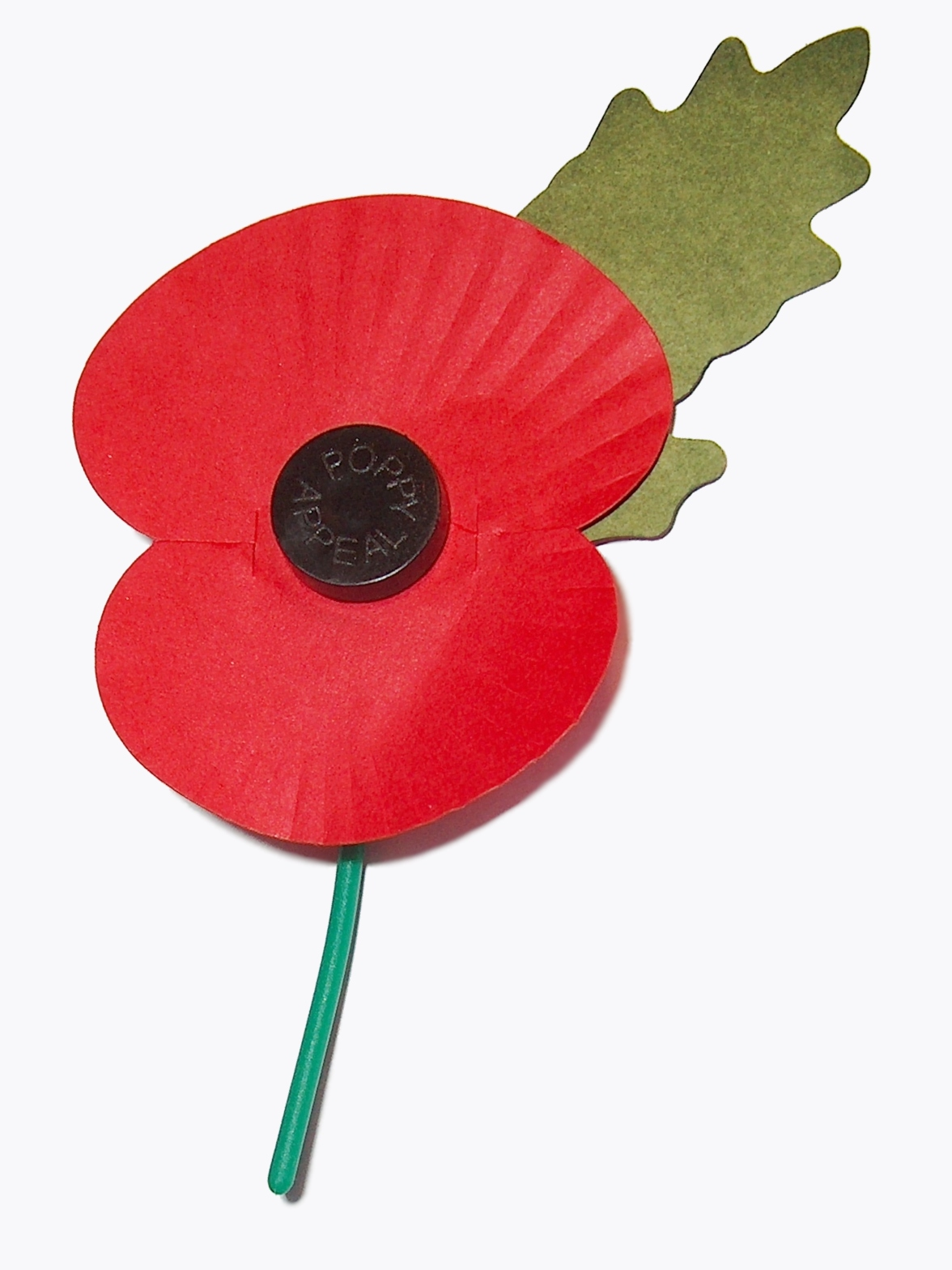
Royal British Legion

Earl Haig Fund Scotland

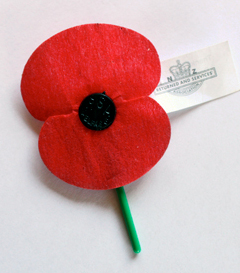
Royal New Zealand Returned and Services' Association

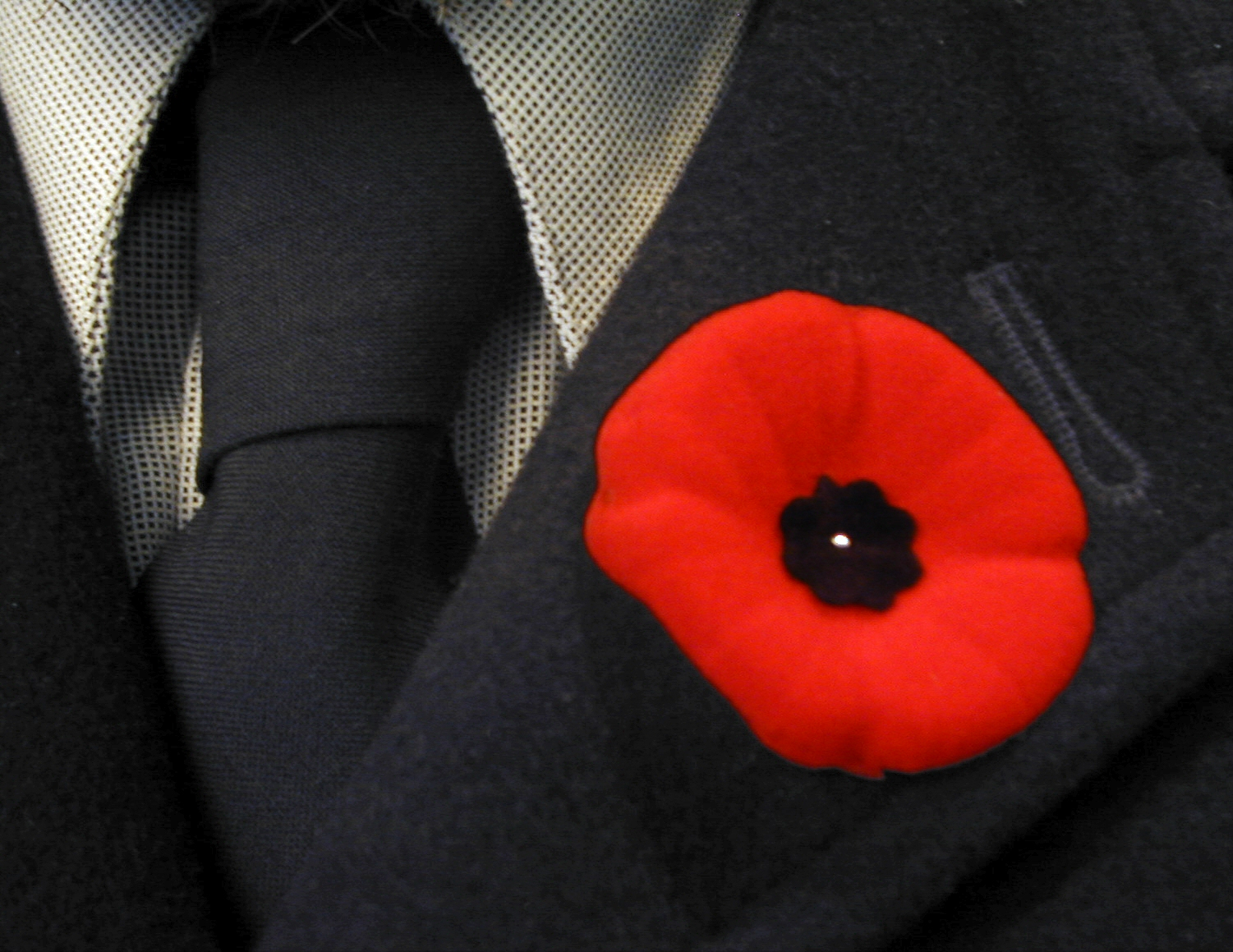
Royal Canadian Legion

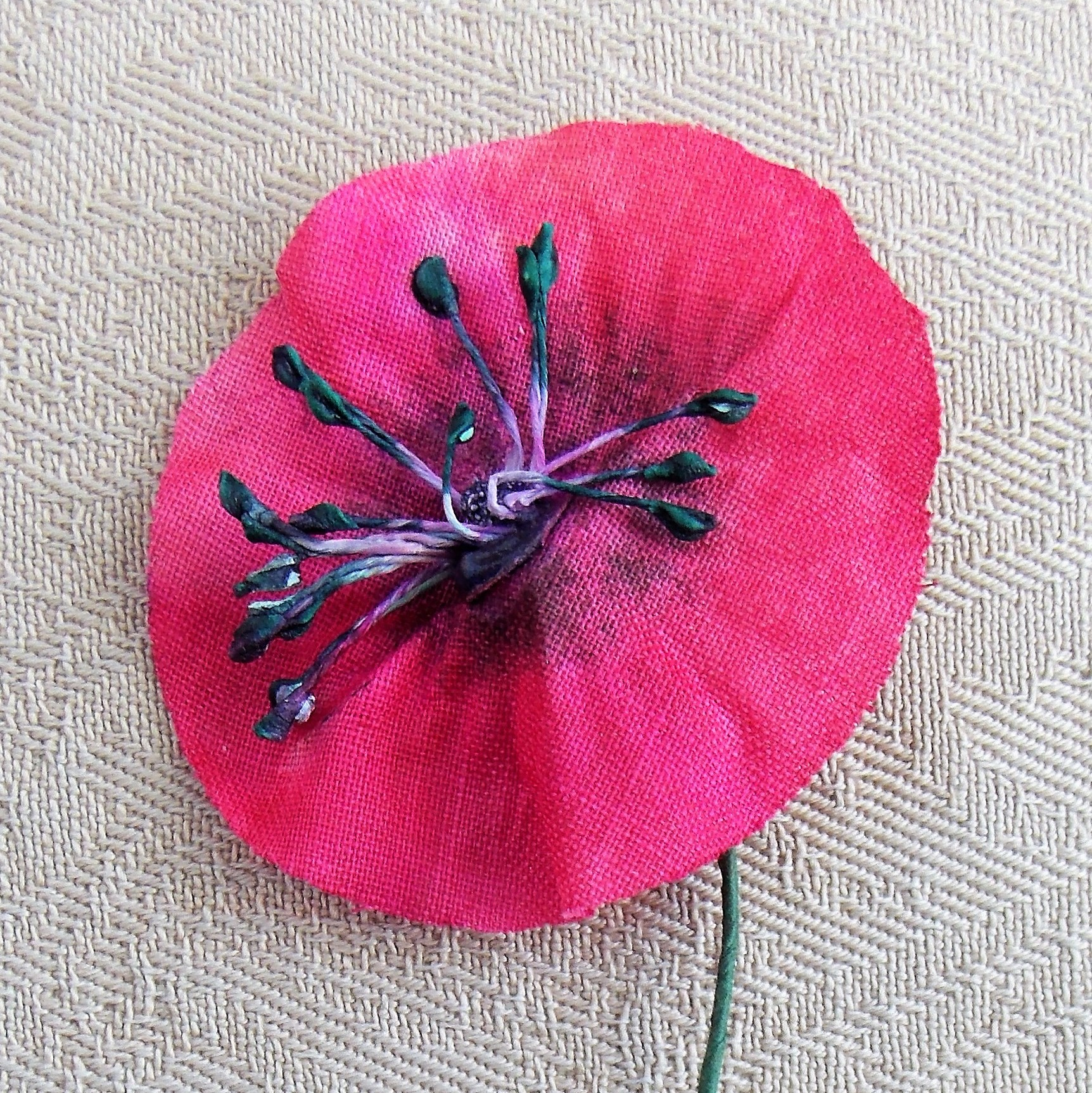
Returned & Services League of Australia circa 1941

== See also ==
- Bleuet de France – the cornflower of France, the French equivalent of the remembrance poppy
- The Red Poppies on Monte Cassino – in Polish tradition, poppies used as a remembrance symbol of the Battle of Monte Cassino
- Ramonda nathaliae, national flower of Serbia, adopted as a remembrance symbol in 2013
