= Purple poppy =

UK symbol of remembrance for animals that served during wartime

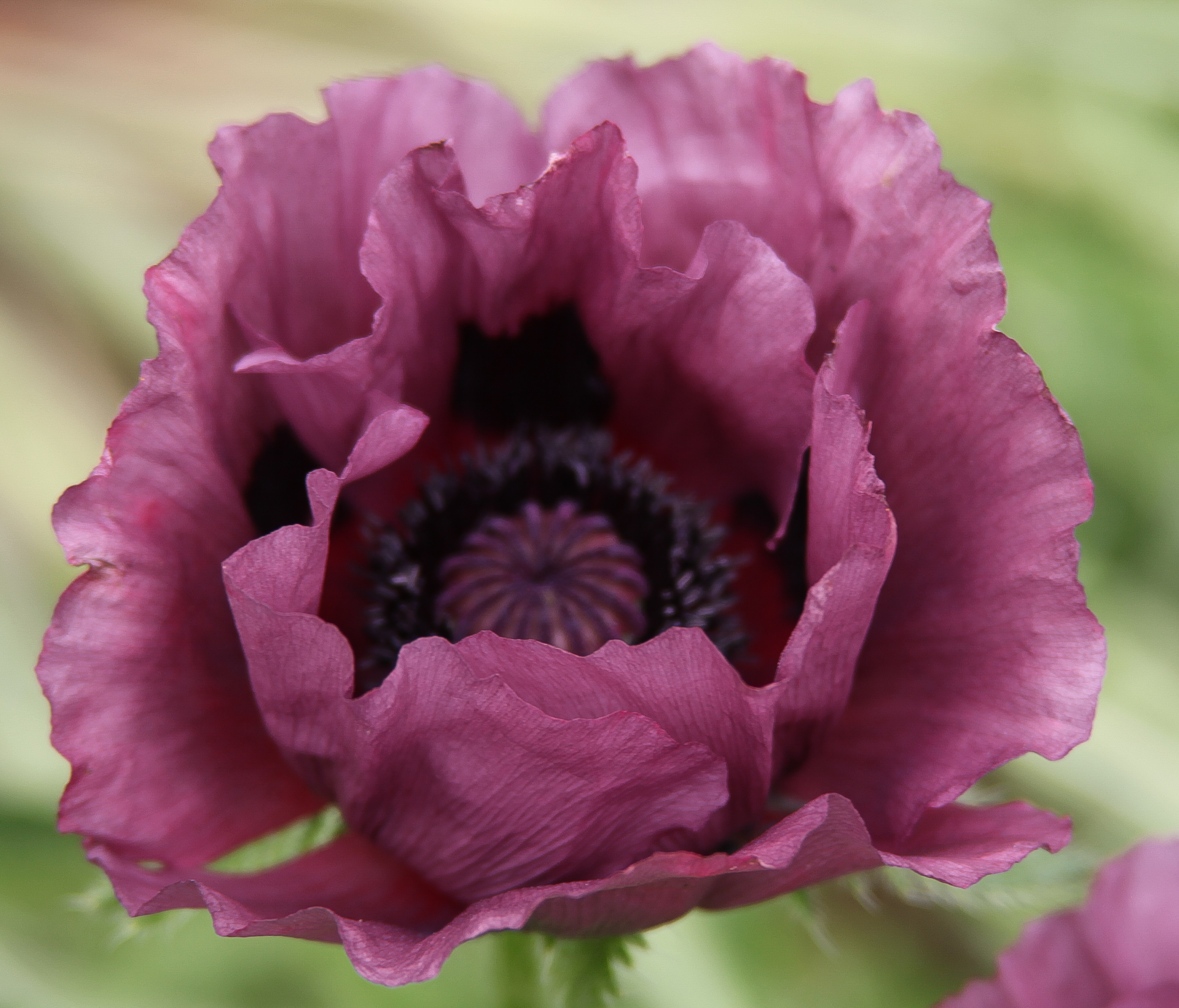
A purple poppy, on which the symbol is based

The purple poppy is a symbol of remembrance in the United Kingdom for animals that served during wartime. The symbol was created in 2006 based on the principle of the traditional red remembrance poppy for Remembrance Day.

In contemporary service, most animals in United Kingdom military service are military working dogs, particularly in the 1st Military Working Dog Regiment. Historically the greatest number of animal casualties in conflict have been horses and ponies.

== Background ==
The purple poppy was created in 2006 by the charity Animal Aid as a way to commemorate animals which served during conflicts as the charity viewed that they had been the forgotten victims of war. Approximately eight million horses and donkeys died during the First World War. It was created to be worn alongside red or white poppies. Animal Aid continued to sell the purple poppy with proceeds going to them until 2015 when they replaced the symbol with an enamel purple paw badge as they felt it was being misinterpreted — the animals are not "heroes" but victims. The purple poppy symbol was subsequently picked up by the Murphy's Army charity in 2016 and continues to be sold by them. Their campaign not only remembers animals lost in service but also pays tribute to those who serve today working alongside the Emergency Services, in the Military, Prisons and Border Forces

There is a specified purple poppy day in addition to Remembrance Day on 11 November where purple poppies would be worn. The date is movable, however. In 2018, in order to coincide with 100 years since the end of the First World War, 23 August was chosen as Purple Poppy Day to coincide with the anniversary of the Battle of Mons. This was the first battle between British and German forces during the First World War.

== Reaction ==
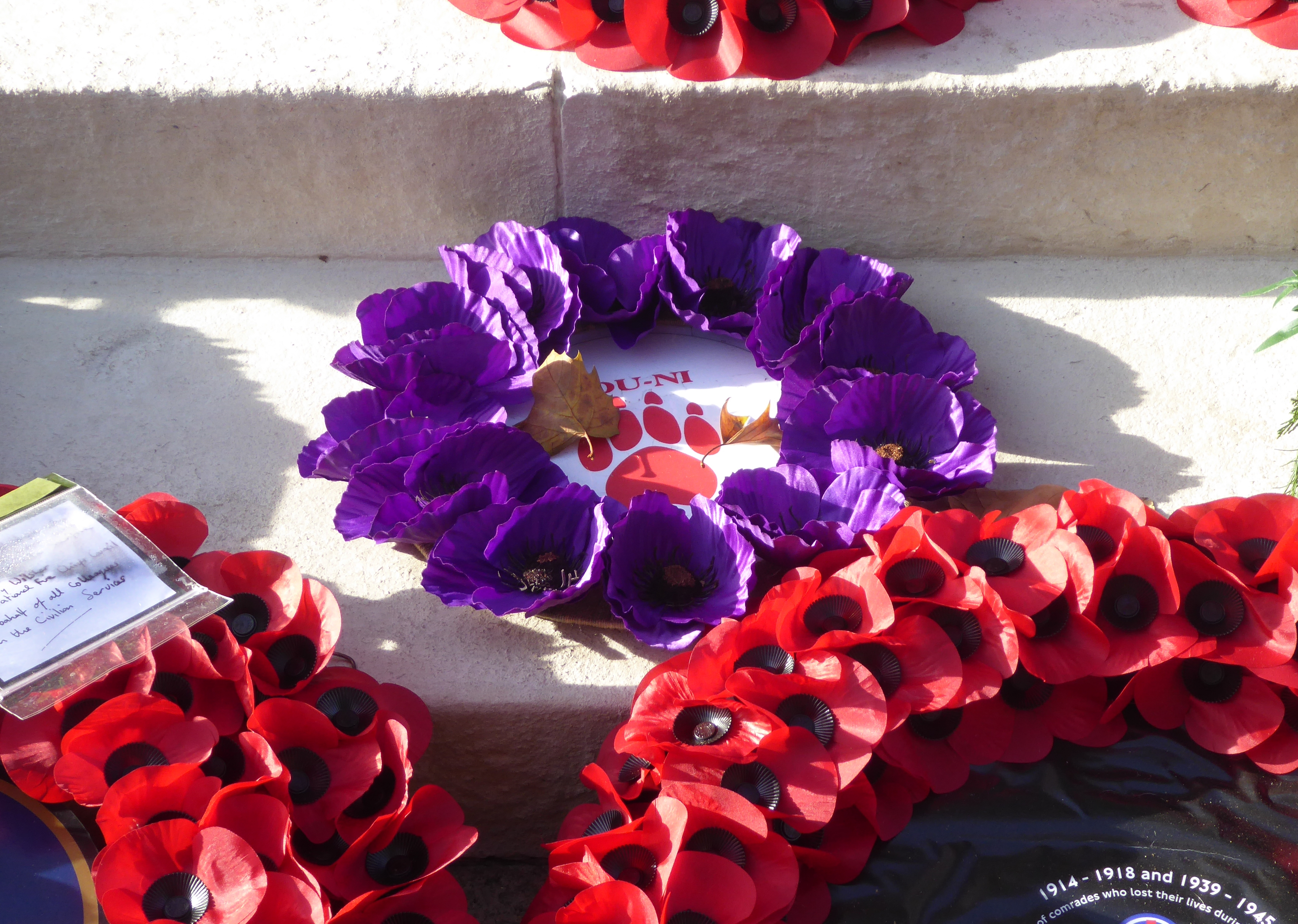
Wreath of purple poppies at The Cenotaph, Whitehall in London on the centenary of the end of World War I in 2018

The purple poppy was not endorsed by the Royal British Legion, which sells the official red remembrance poppies. However they did state: "We see no conflict in wearing the red poppy next to the purple or white poppy. Many animal rights supporters also support our work. We do ask that the items are not offered alongside each other however as this would confuse the public." Some towns have included purple poppies alongside red ones in official Remembrance displays.

== See also ==
- Animals in War Memorial – commemorating the countless animals that have served and died under British military command throughout history
- Dickin Medal – instituted in 1943 in the United Kingdom by Maria Dickin to honour the work of animals during and after the Second World War.
