= Site John McCrae =

WWI battlefield memorial site

- Kanaaldijk – site John McCrae
- Interactive map of Site John McCrae
- Location: Ypres, West Flanders, Belgium
- Coordinates: 50°52′15″N 02°52′23″E
- Type: war memorial site
- Dedicated to: John McCrae (1872–1918)
- administrated by the Municipality of Ypres

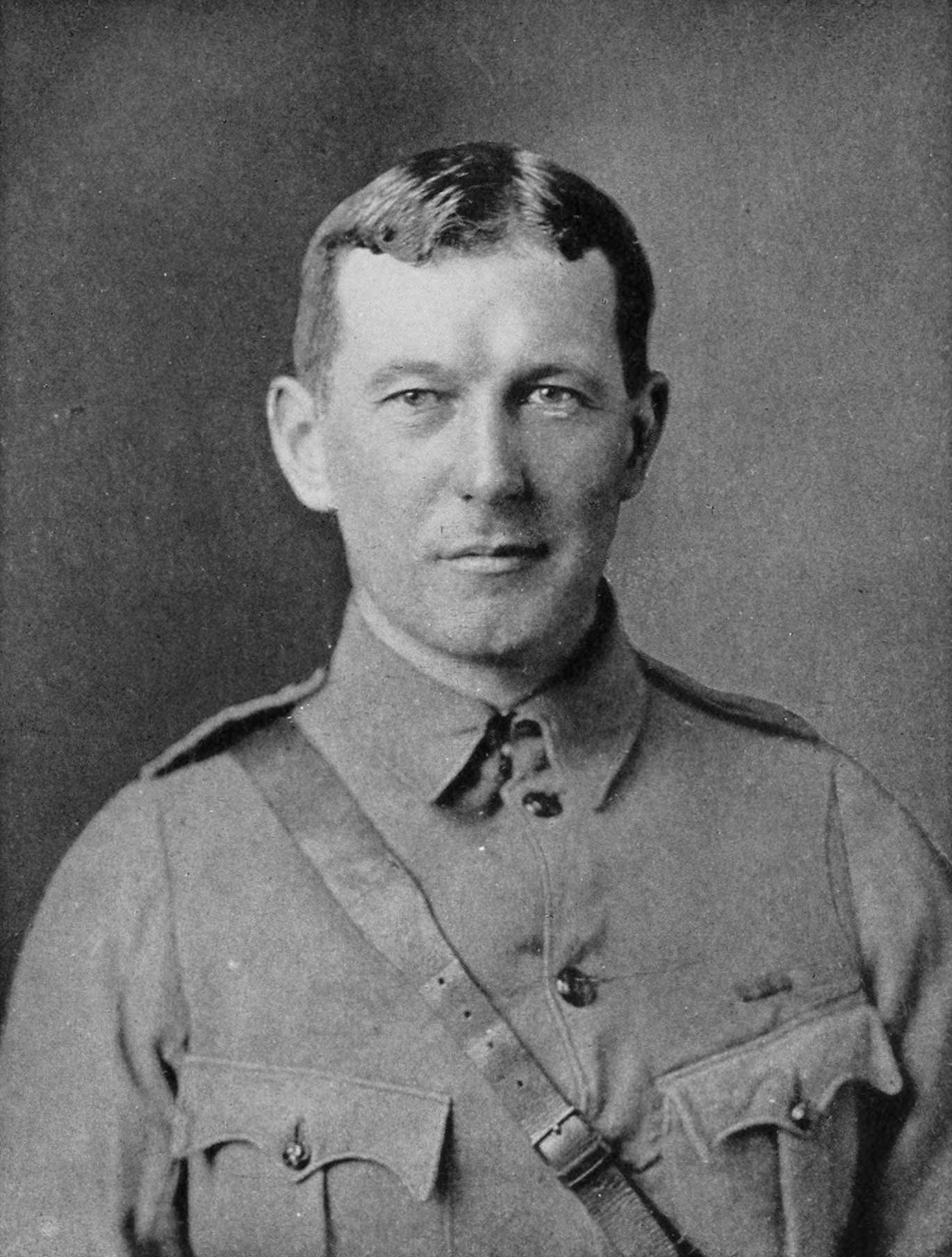
Lieutenant Colonel John McCrae, MD (1872–1918) was a soldier, physician and poet.

Site John McCrae (Dutch: Kanaaldijk – site John McCrae) is a World War I memorial site near Ypres, Belgium. It is named after the Canadian physician Lieutenant Colonel John McCrae, MD (1872–1918), author of the famous poem "In Flanders Fields", which he composed while serving at this site in 1915.

== Location ==
Site John McCrae is located directly adjacent to the Ieperlee (Ypres Canal), about halfway in between the centre of Ypres and the centre of Boezinge, about 2.5 km from each. The memorial site is set in between Diksmuidseweg (N369) in the west and the Ieperlee in the east, and can – for the purpose of orientation – be roughly divided into four sections: The south-west of the site is now occupied by the Essex Farm CWGC Cemetery. The north-western quarter is privately used as farmland, while the north-east and south-east are partially wooded and dominated by the artificially constructed earthen ridge of the embankment, which runs parallel to the Ieperlee. In the centre of the memorial site are the remains of concrete bunkers used by a British Advanced Dressing Station, while separate memorials to John McCrae and his poem In Flanders Fields are just to the east of these bunkers. In the north-eastern quarter of the memorial site are the remains of emergency housing provided by the Belgian government for the local population during the First World War, while the most visible landmark in the south-eastern quarter of the site is the memorial to the 49th (West Riding) Infantry Division on the ridge of the dyke.

== Landmarks ==
=== British Advanced Dressing Station ===
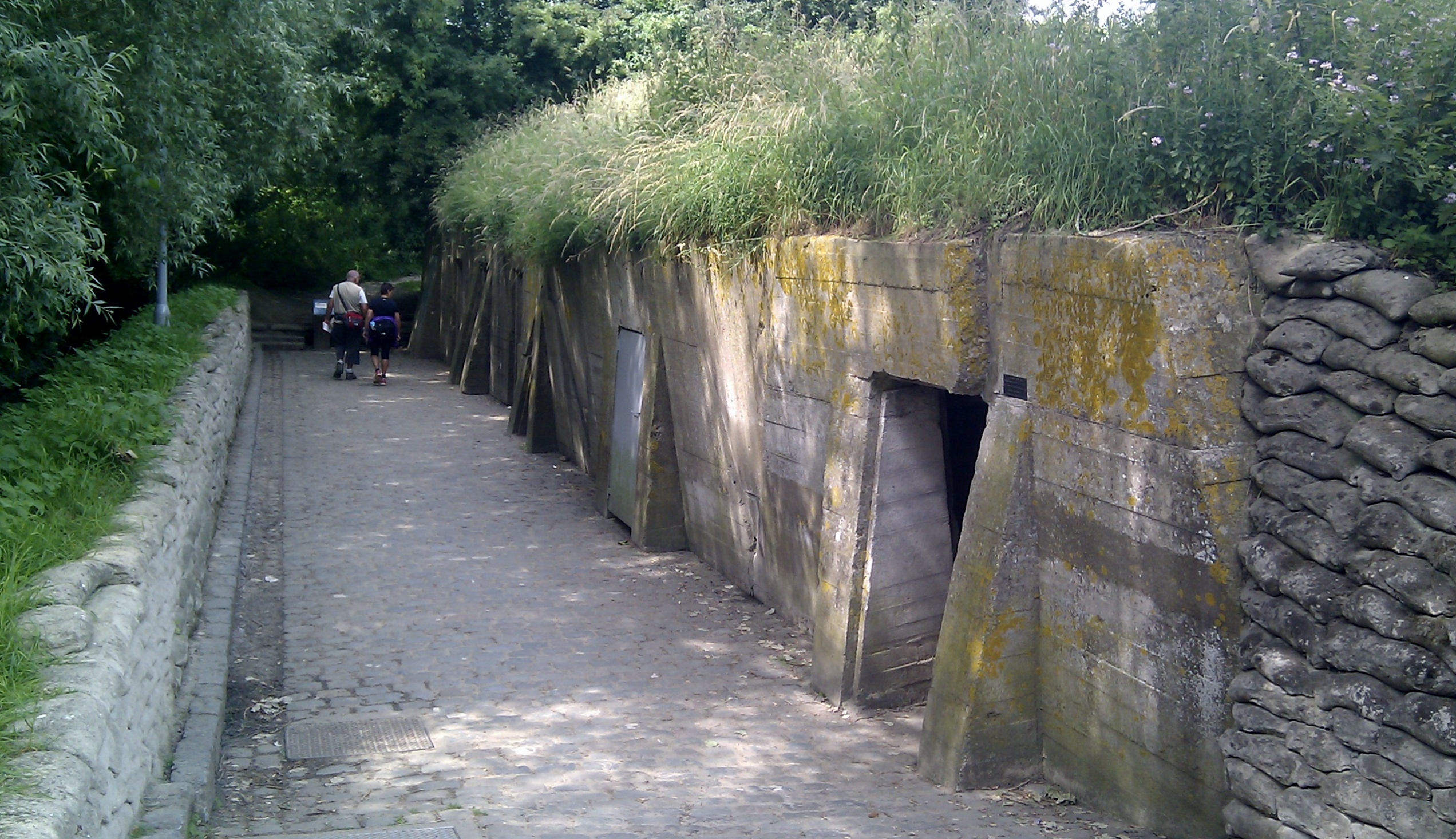
Bunkers used by the Advanced Dressing Station

During the First World War, the Ieperlee was part of the frontline. It linked the Ypres Salient, held by the French and English, to the Yser Front, held by the Belgian Army. Because of its location close to the frontline, the canal bank was chosen by the British as the site of an Advanced Dressing Station. During the Second Battle of Ypres in April–May 1915, a first basic medical station for British Army casualties was established in rough dugouts cut into the western bank of the canal. The original crude dugouts in the canal bank were expanded into a dressing station by 1917 and reinforced with concrete. They gradually developed into a series of rooms and a larger medical station was built up with huts to cope with larger numbers of wounded. The Advanced Dressing Station was also equipped with a railway line, narrow gauge railway lines and camps to cope with the huge number of wounded soldiers from the northern part of the Ypres Salient. The land south of the farm known by Allied soldiers as "Essex Farm" was used as a dressing station cemetery from April 1915 to August 1917. The 49th (West Riding) Infantry Division buried their dead of 1915 in Plot I. Many burials were made without definite plan.

=== Memorials to In Flanders Fields ===
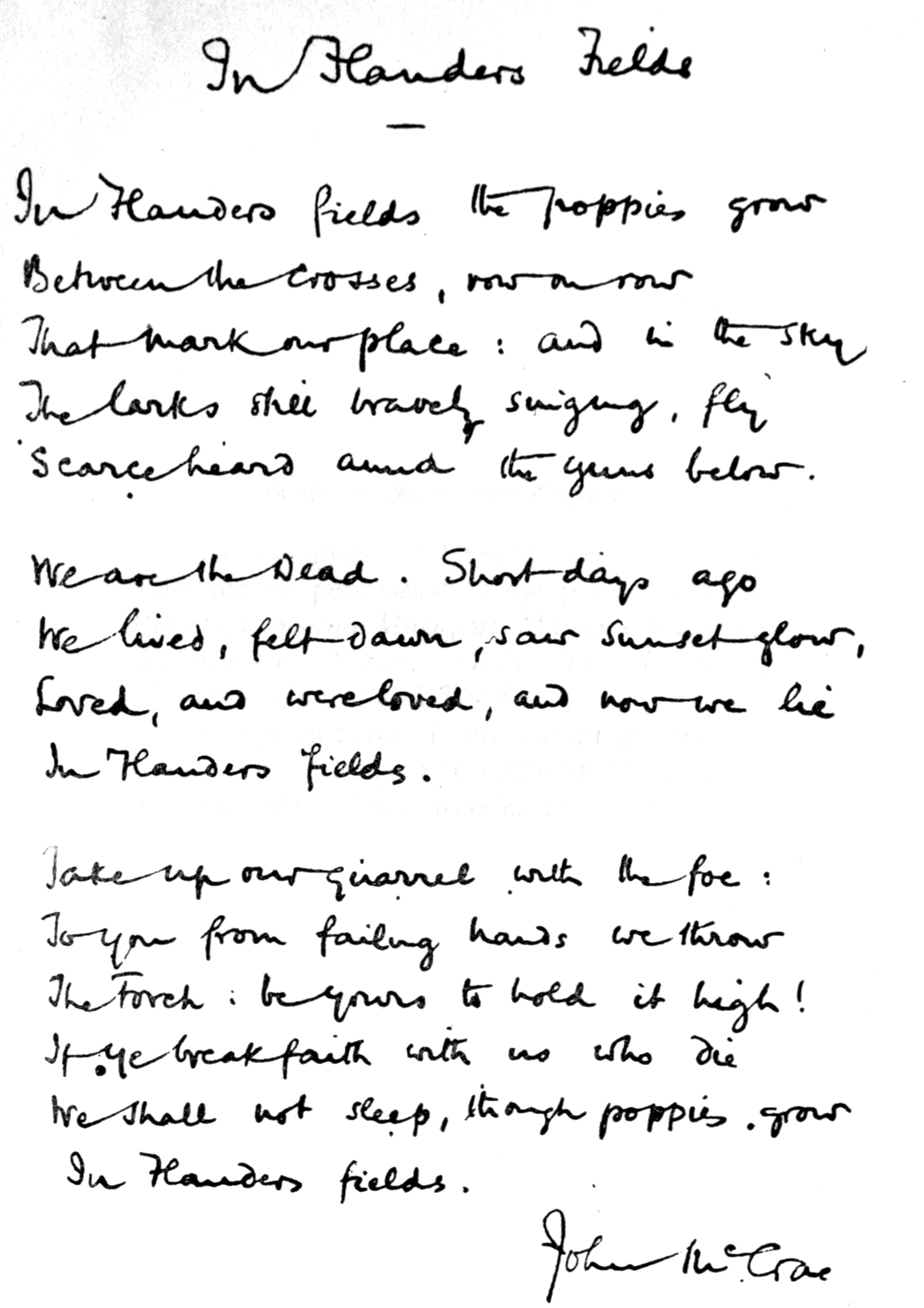
An autographed copy of the poem from In Flanders Fields and Other Poems.

Lieutenant Colonel John McCrae, MD fought in the second battle of Ypres when the German army launched one of the first chemical attacks in the history of war. They attacked the Canadian position with chlorine gas on 22 April 1915, but were unable to break through the Canadian line, which held for over two weeks. In a letter written to his mother, McCrae described the battle as a "nightmare": "For seventeen days and seventeen nights none of us have had our clothes off, nor our boots even, except occasionally. In all that time while I was awake, gunfire and rifle fire never ceased for sixty seconds.... And behind it all was the constant background of the sights of the dead, the wounded, the maimed, and a terrible anxiety lest the line should give way."

Alexis Helmer, a close friend, was killed during the battle on May 2. McCrae performed the burial service himself, at which time he noted how poppies quickly grew around the graves of those who died at Ypres. The next day, he composed the poem while sitting in the back of an ambulance at the Essex Farm Advanced Dressing Station.

There are two memorials to McCrae and his poem on the site: a small lozenge-shaped plaque (Albertina Marker) just off Diksmuidseweg (N369) and a larger wall tablet close to the bunkers used by the Advanced Dressing Station.

=== 49th Infantry Division Memorial ===
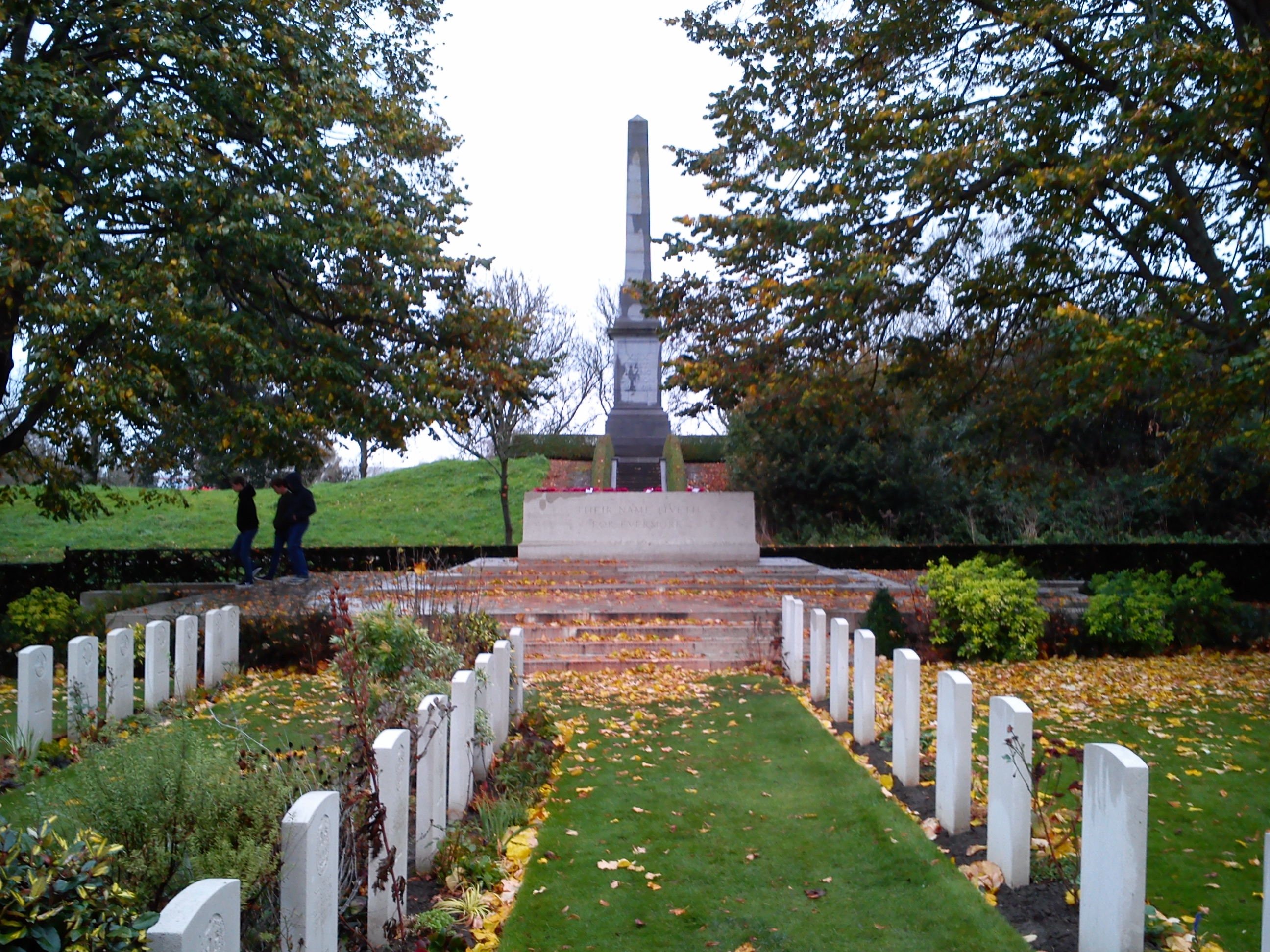
49th Infantry Division Memorial

The 49th (West Riding) Infantry Division Memorial is immediately behind the cemetery, on top of the canal bank. It is shaped like an obelisk and accessed via a flight of stairs leading up the canal bank from Essex Farm Commonwealth War Graves Commission Cemetery.

=== Essex Farm CWGC Cemetery ===
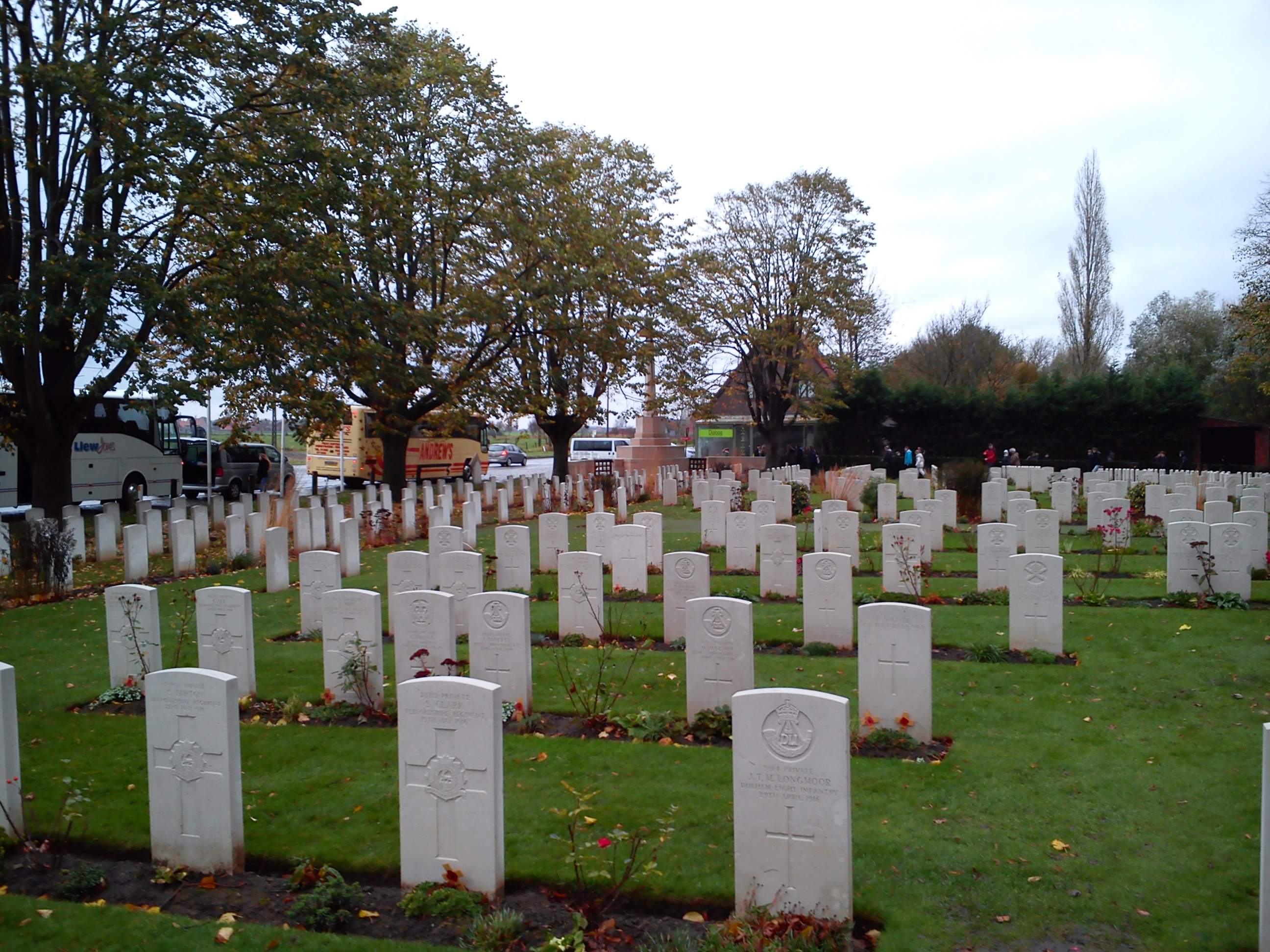
Essex Farm CWGC Cemetery

This Commonwealth War Graves Commission war cemetery was designed by Sir Reginald Blomfield. There are 1,200 servicemen of the First World War buried or commemorated in Essex Farm CWGC Cemetery. 103 of the burials are unidentified but special memorials commemorate 19 casualties known or believed to be buried among them.

=== Belgian emergency housing ===
In the north-eastern quarter of the memorial site, partially hidden by trees, are the remains of former shelters that were used as emergency housing provided by the Belgian government for the local population during the First World War. These were constructed using pre-fabricated curved concrete elements, covered with metal sheets and then with earth.

== Gallery ==
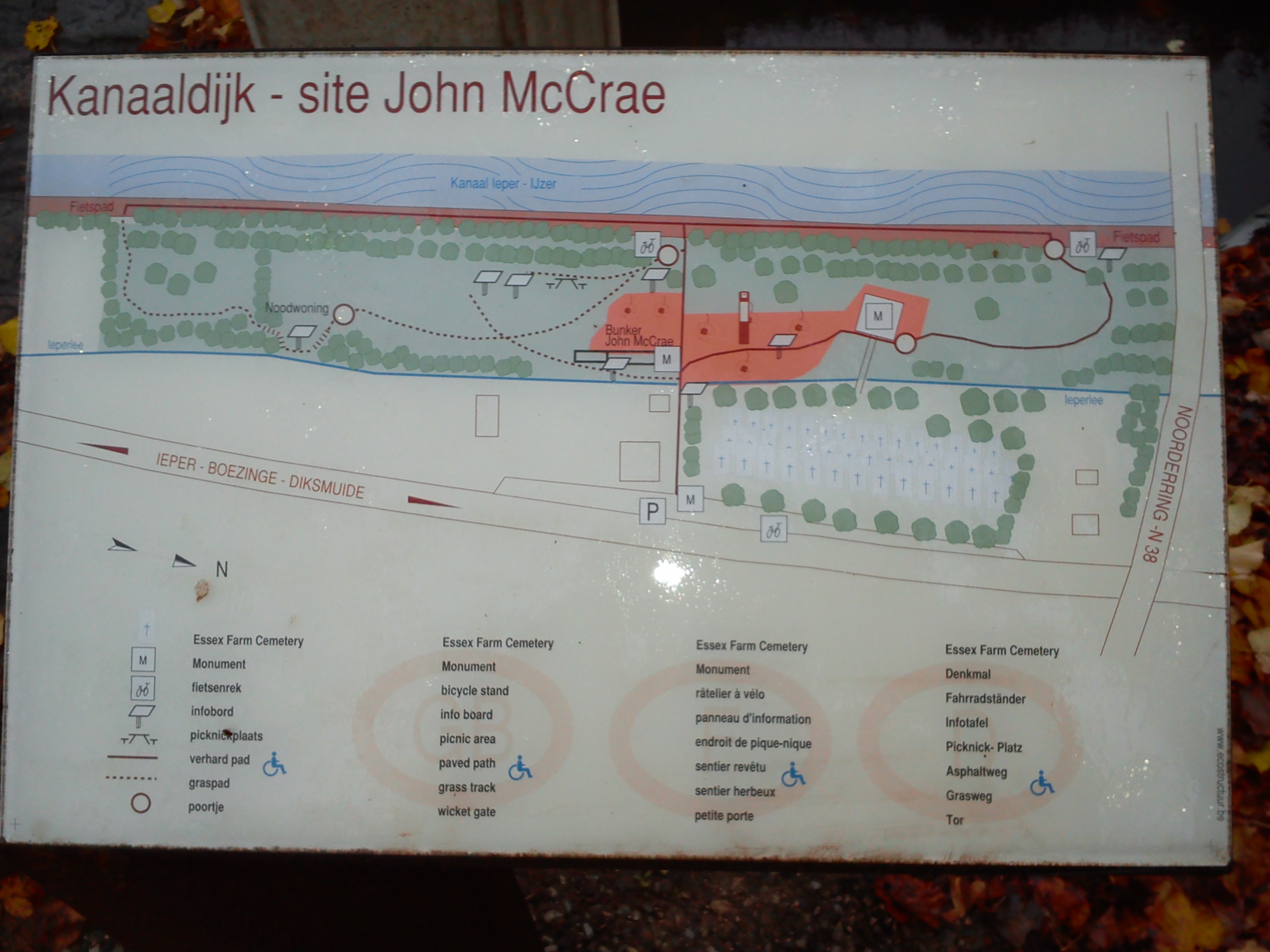
Information tablet

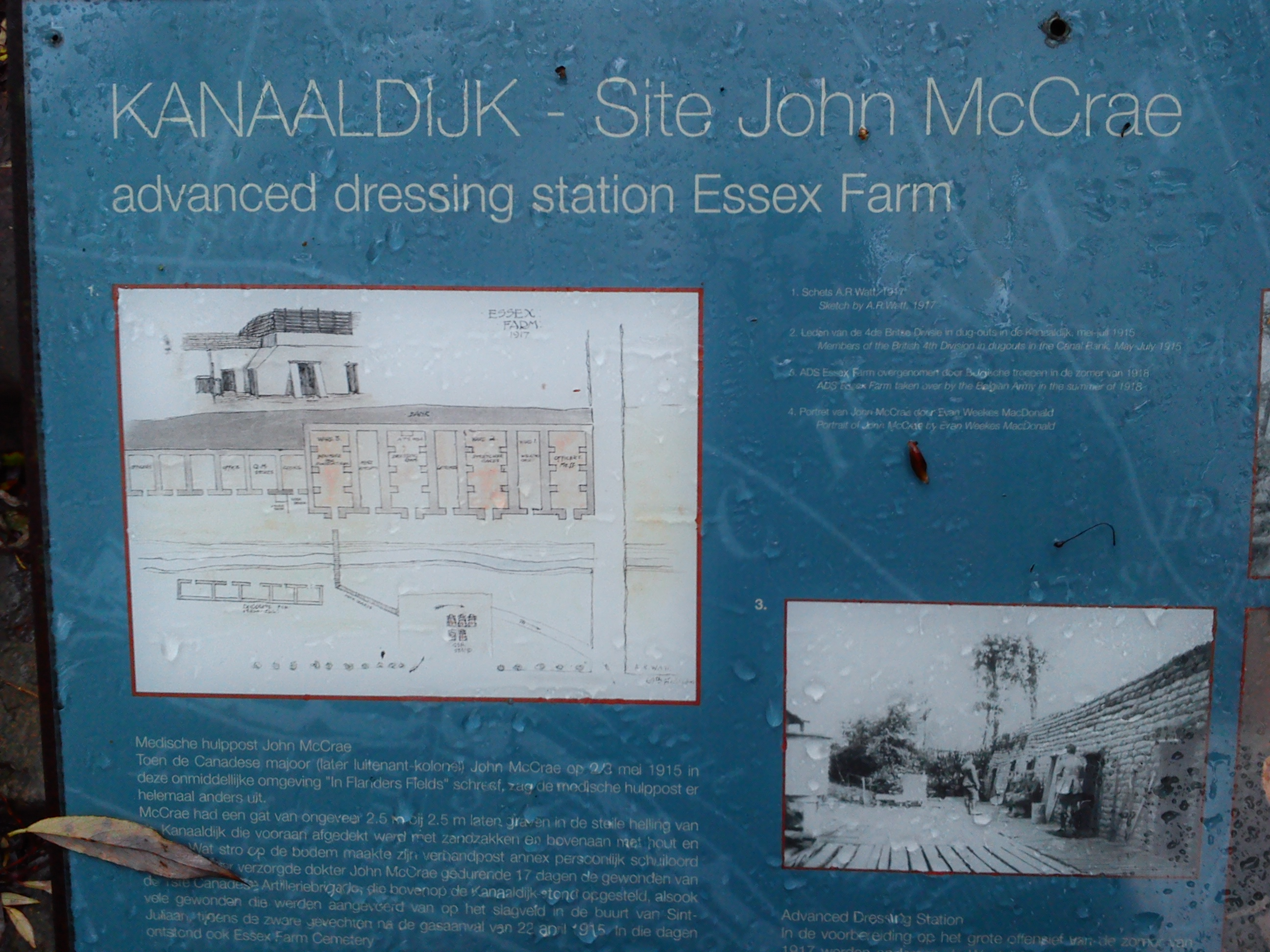
Information tablet

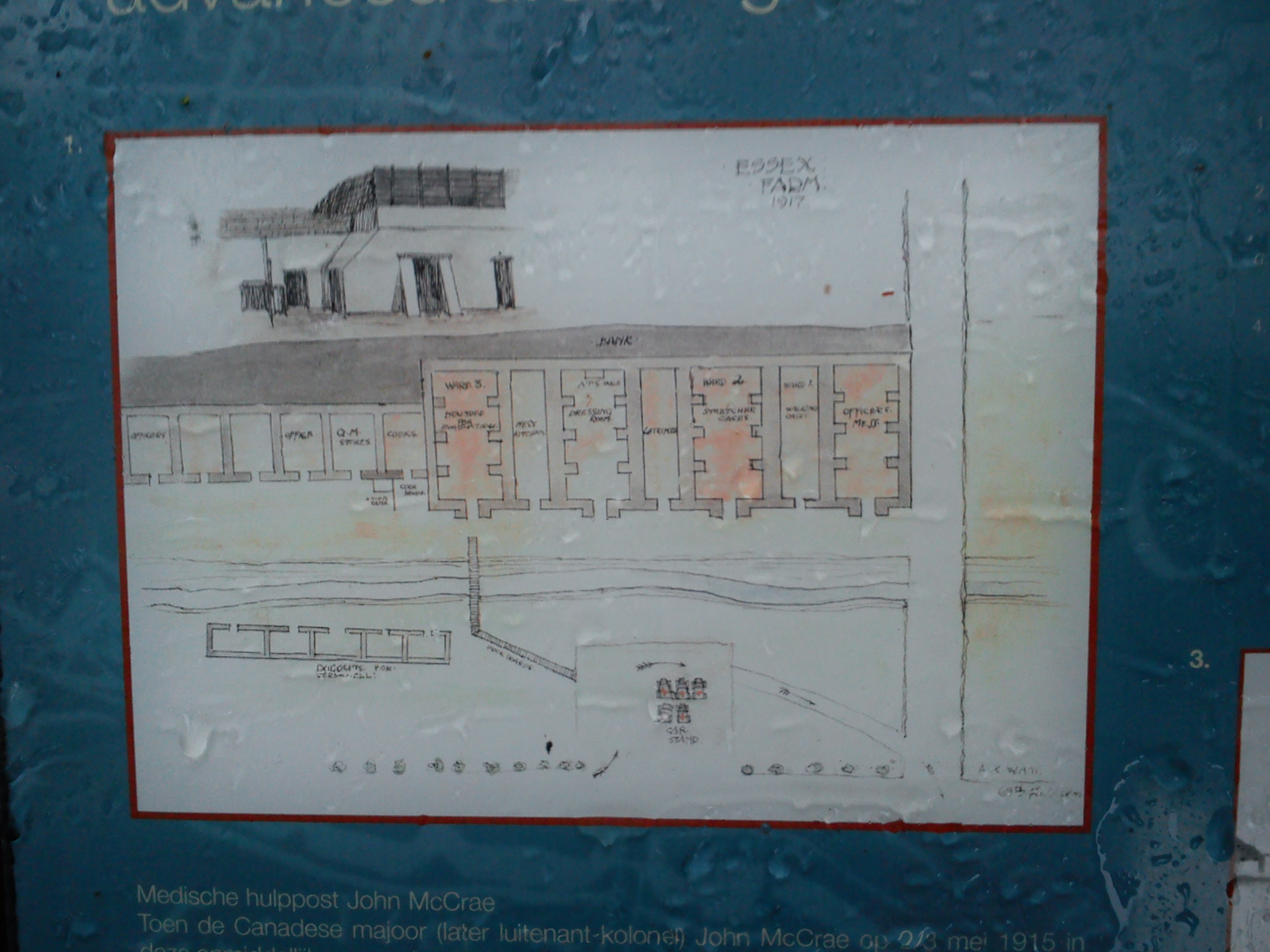
Information tablet

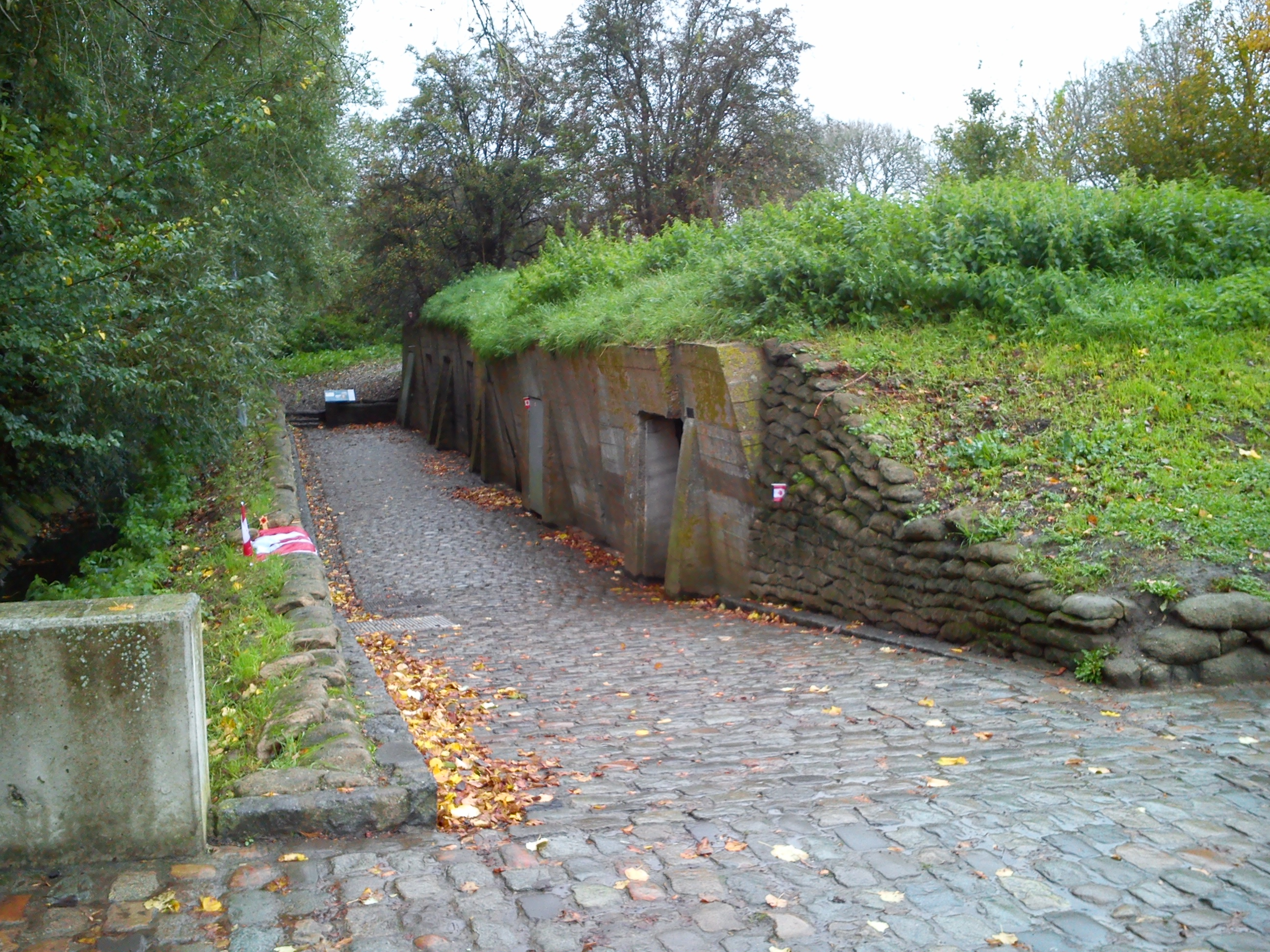
Bunkers used by the Advanced Dressing Station

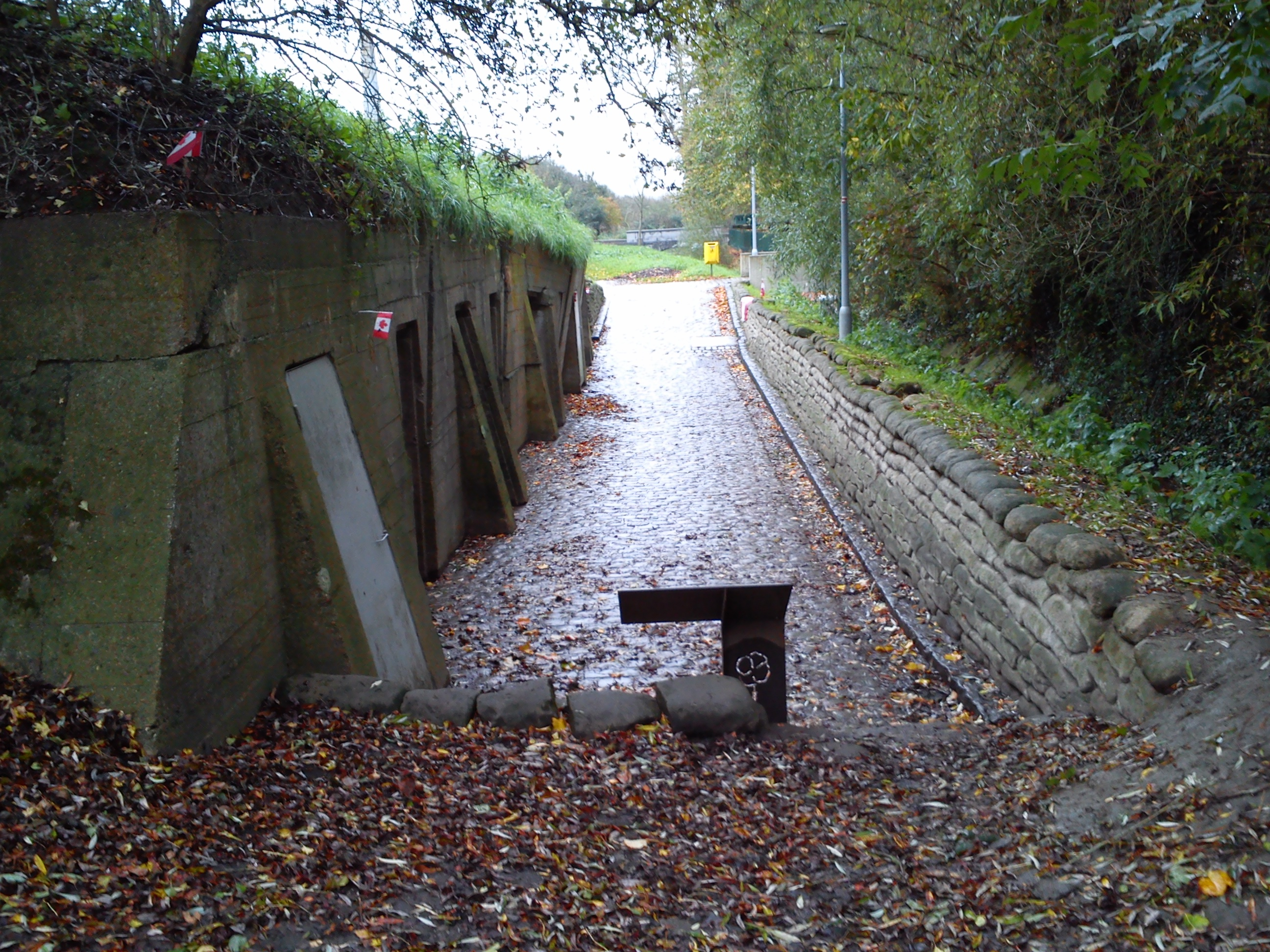
Bunkers used by the Advanced Dressing Station

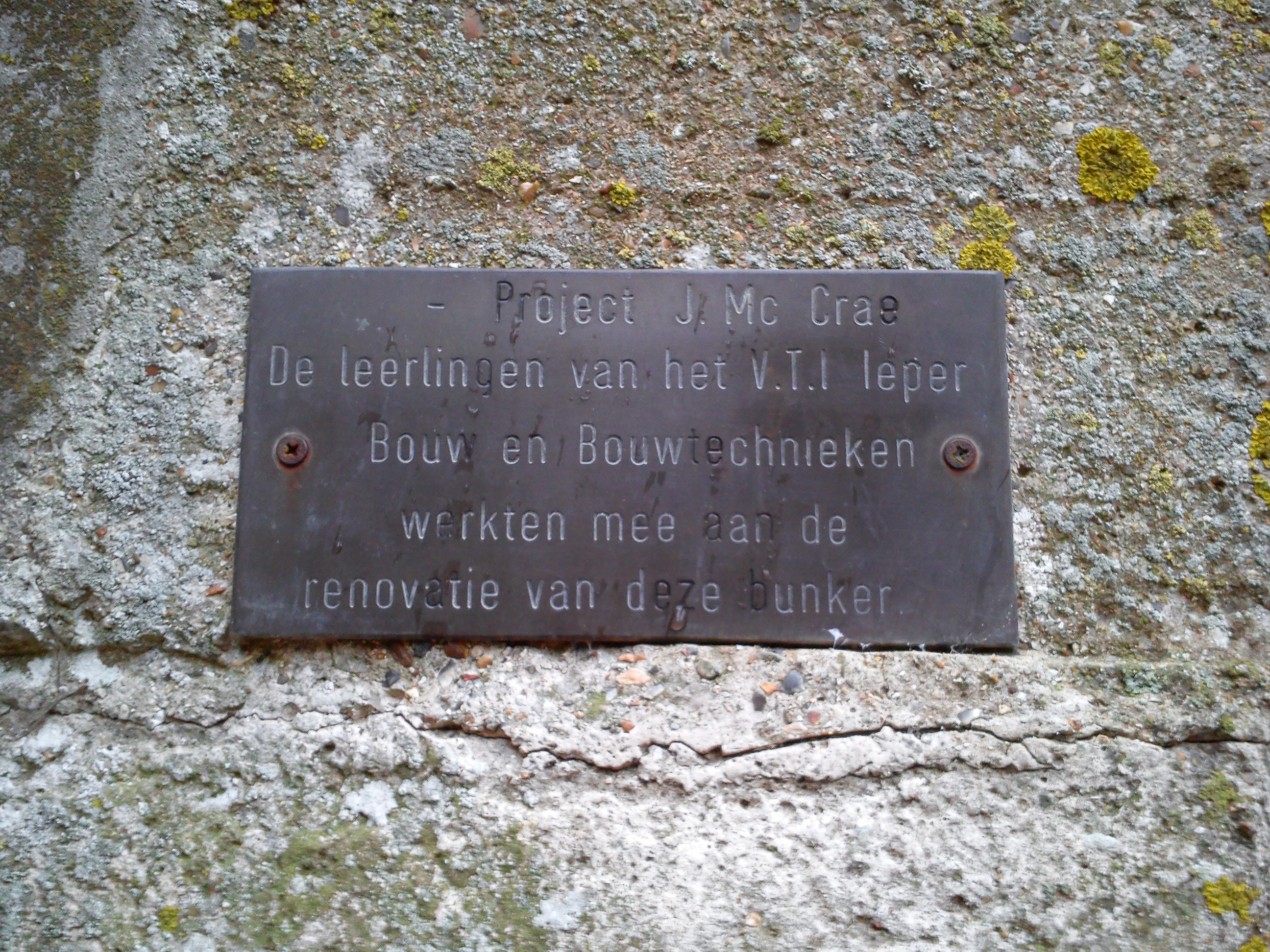
Advanced Dressing Station, memorial to refurbishment

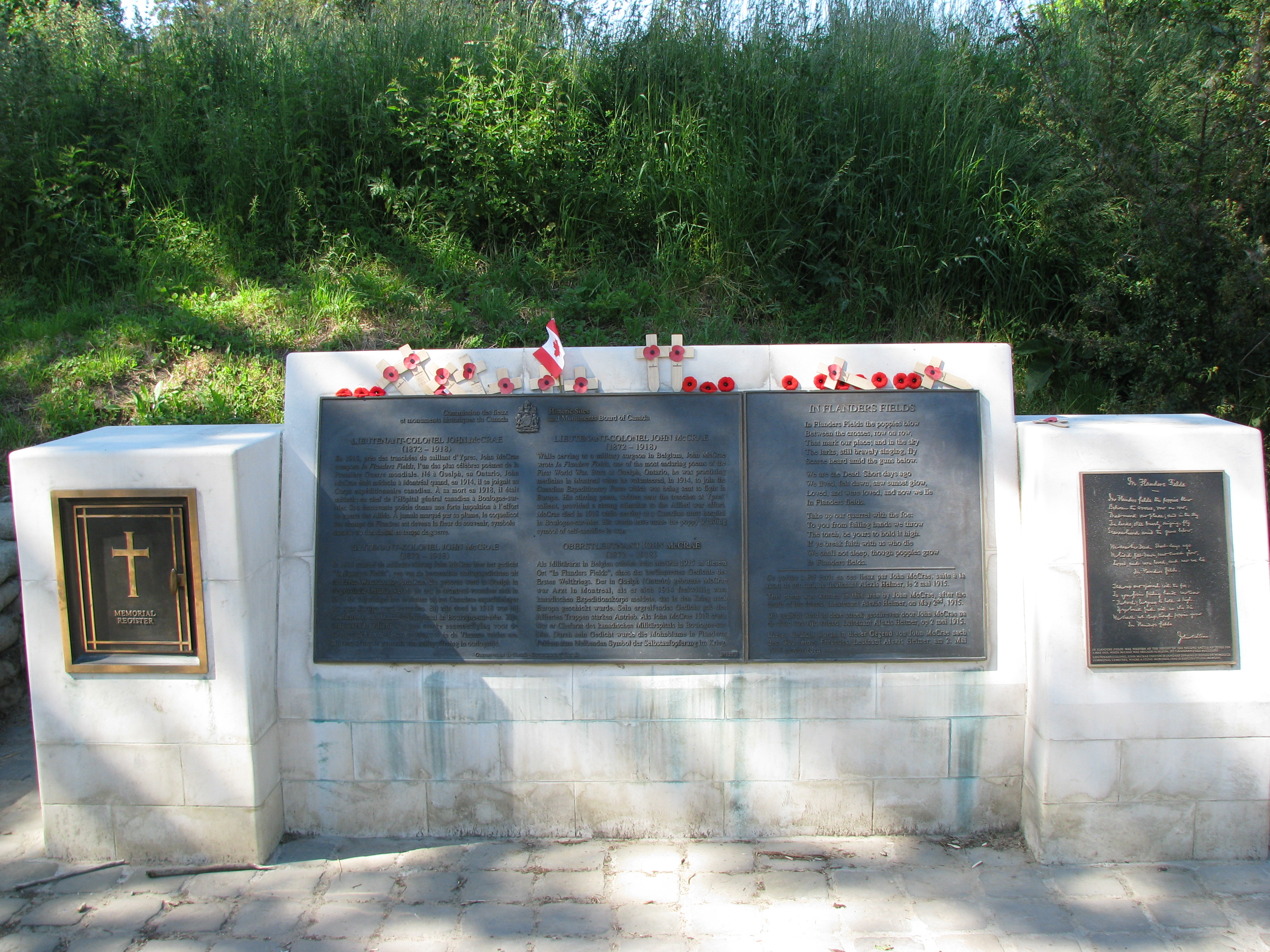
In Flanders Fields memorial

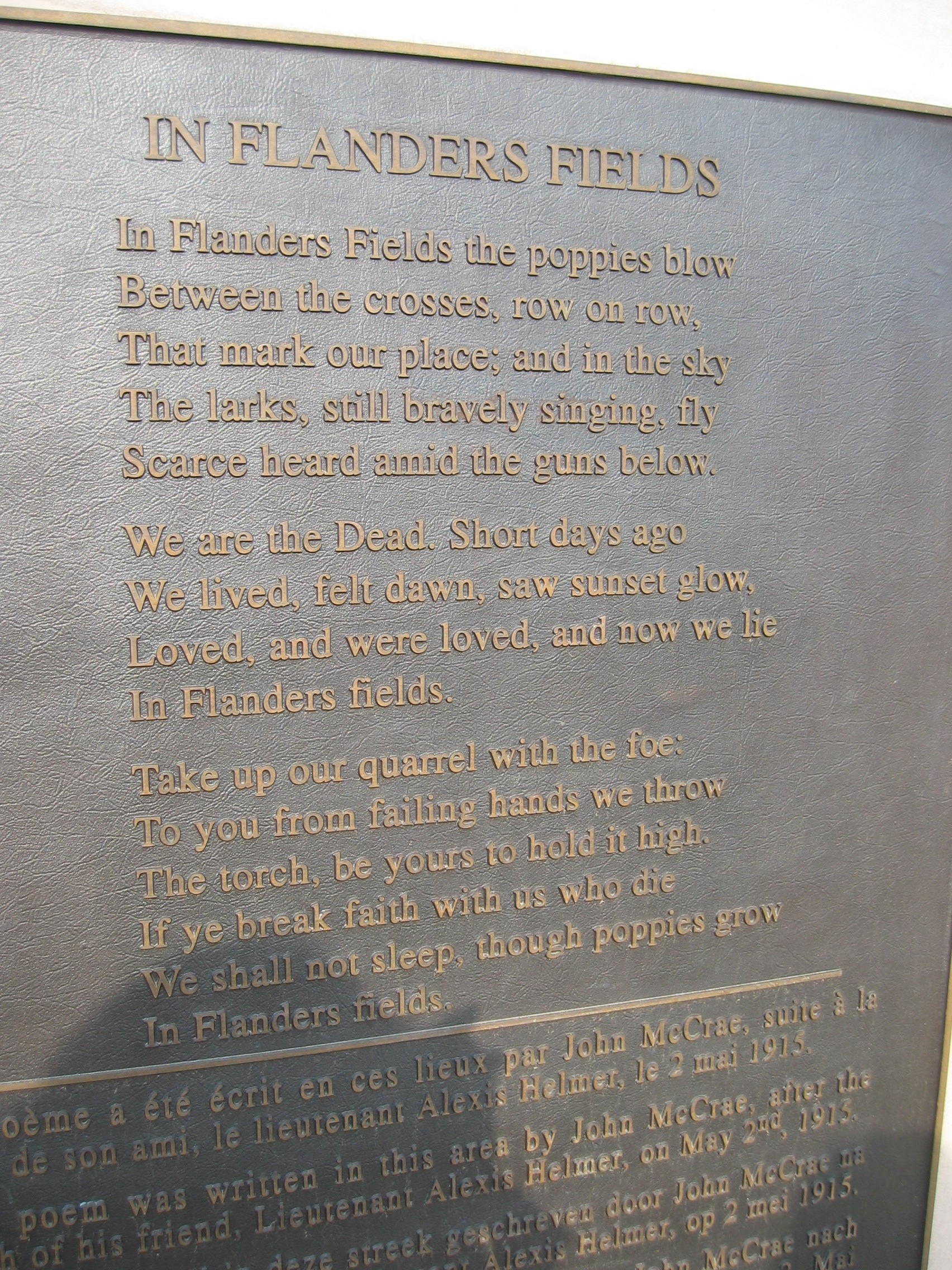
In Flanders Fields memorial

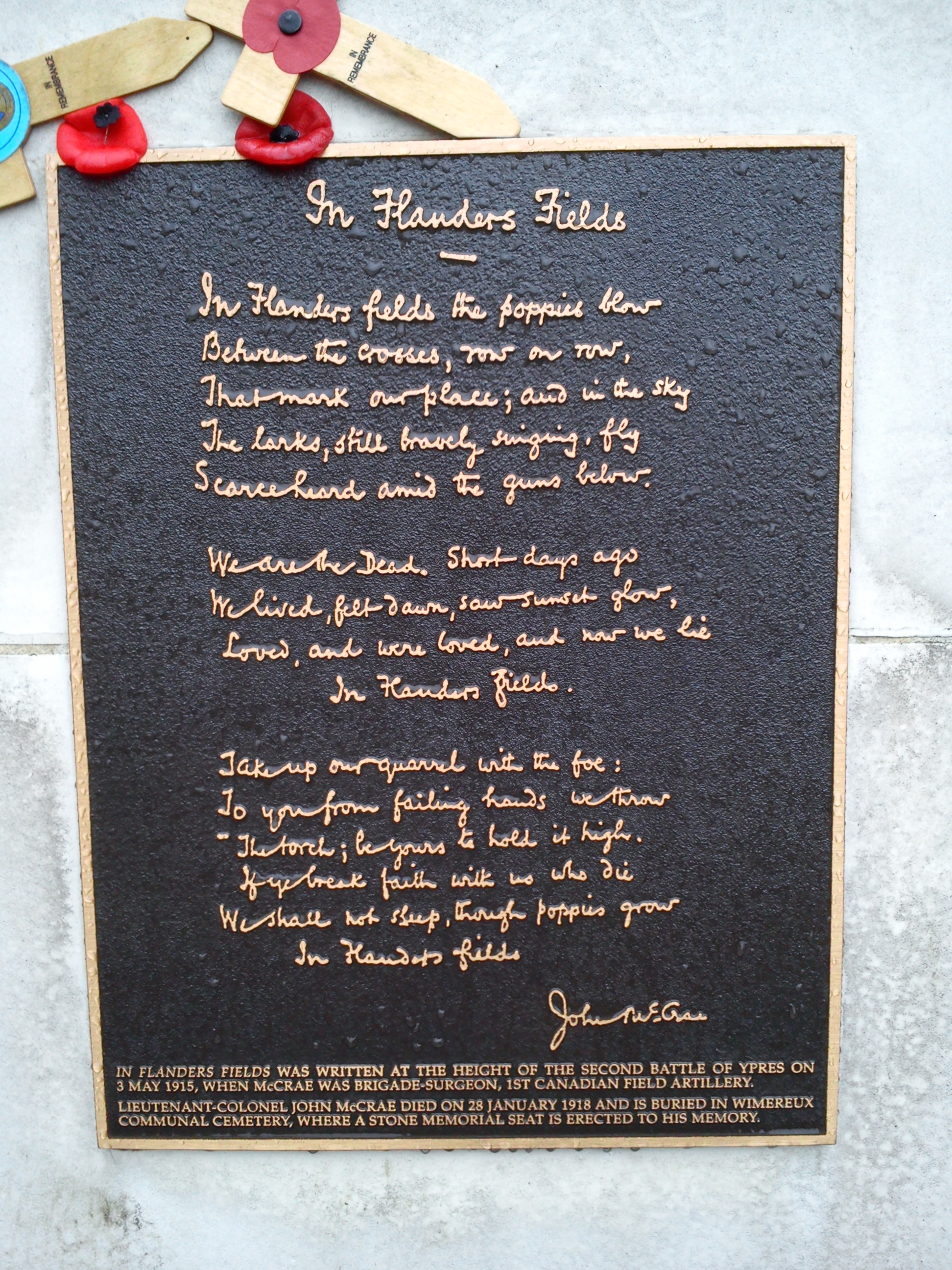
In Flanders Fields memorial

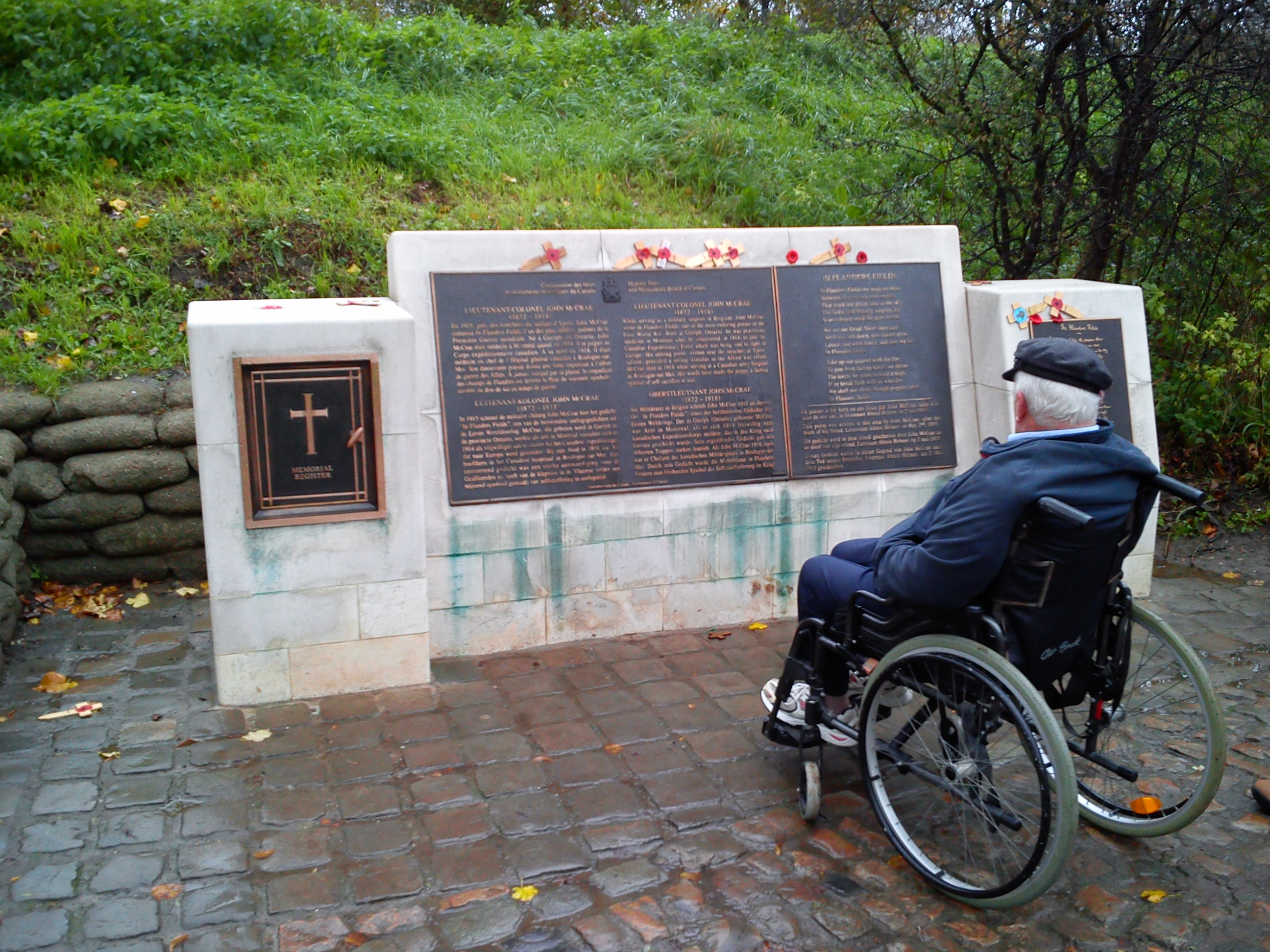
In Flanders Fields memorial

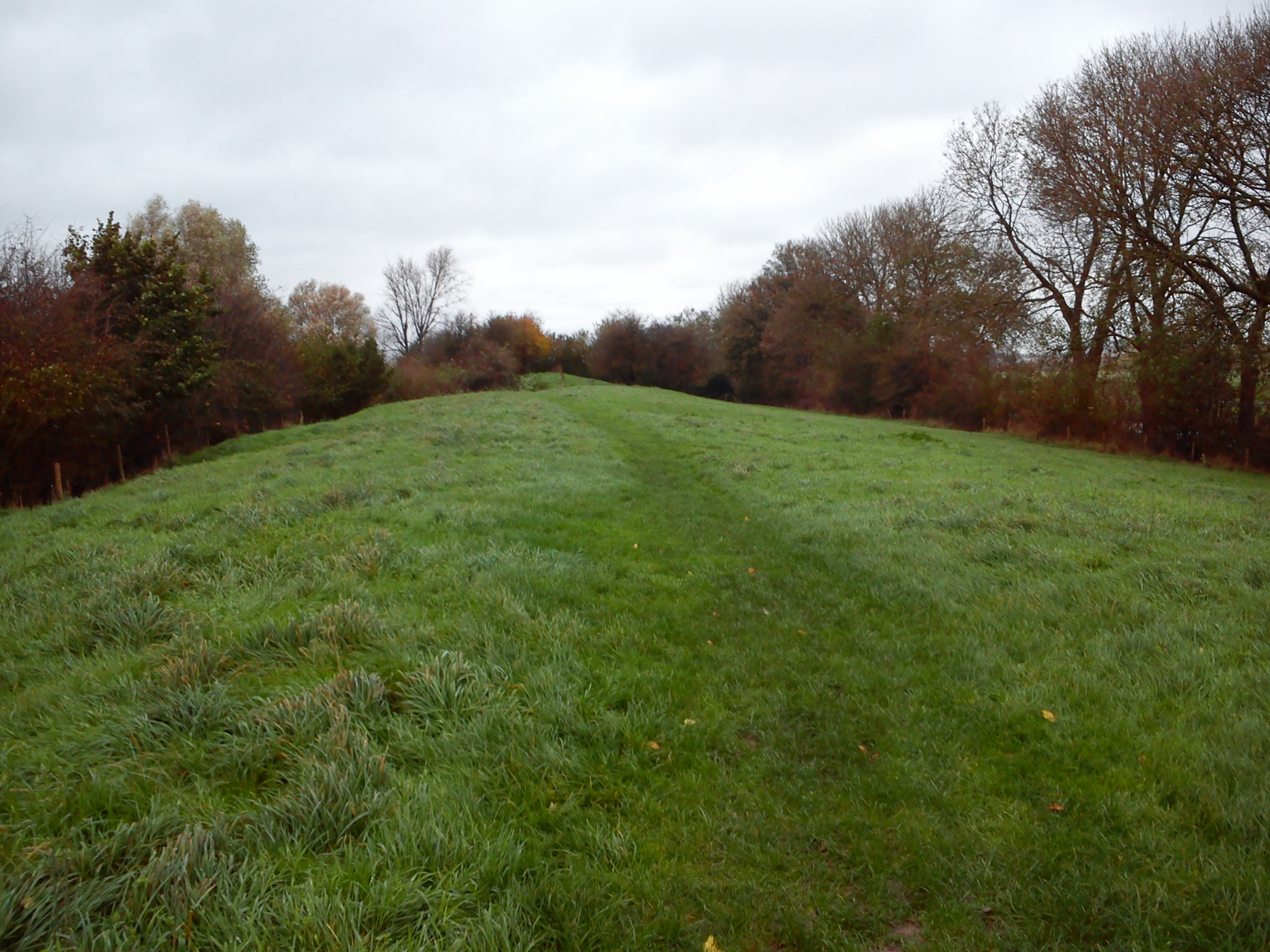
canal dyke

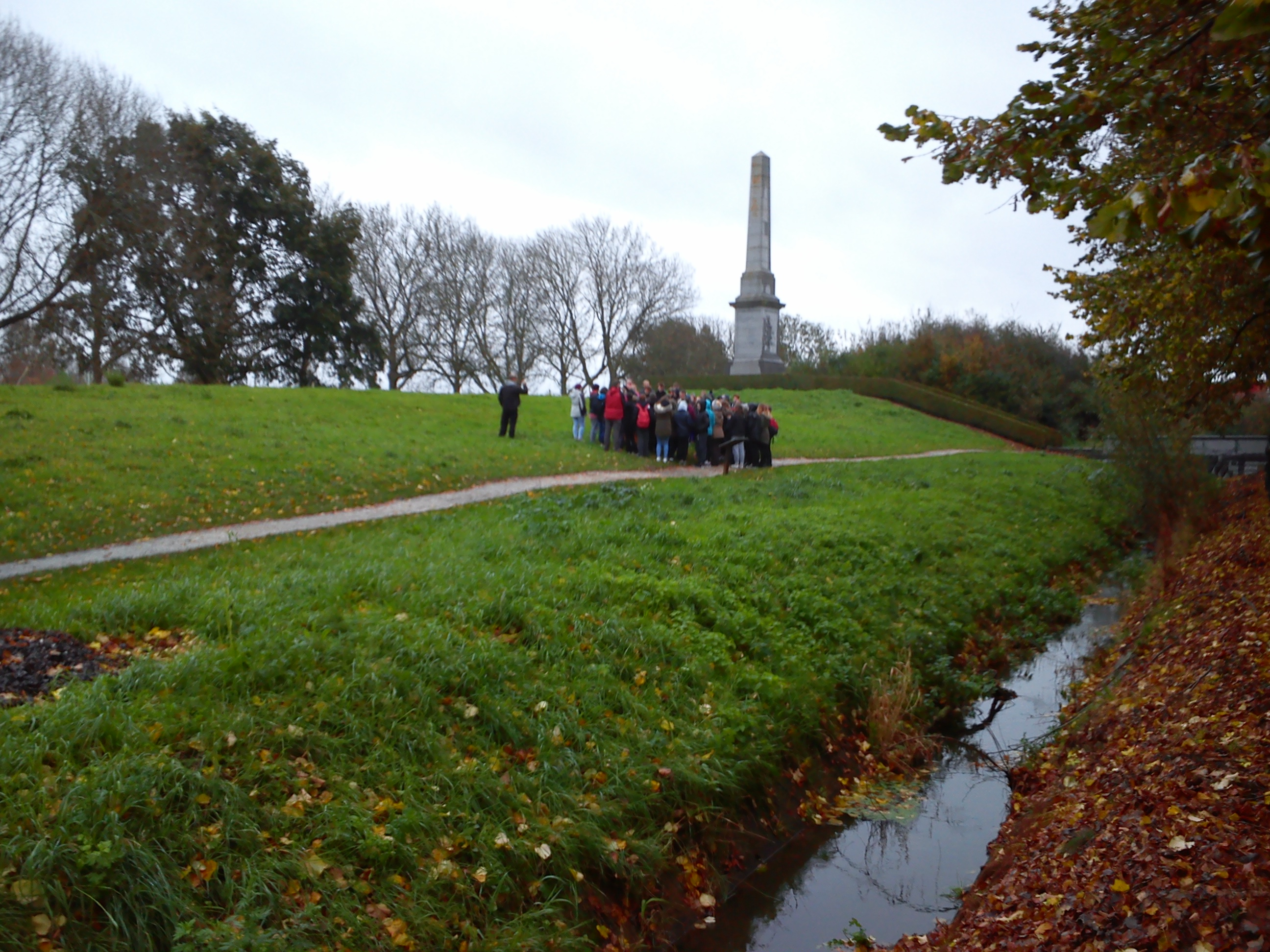
canal dyke and 49th Infantry Division Memorial

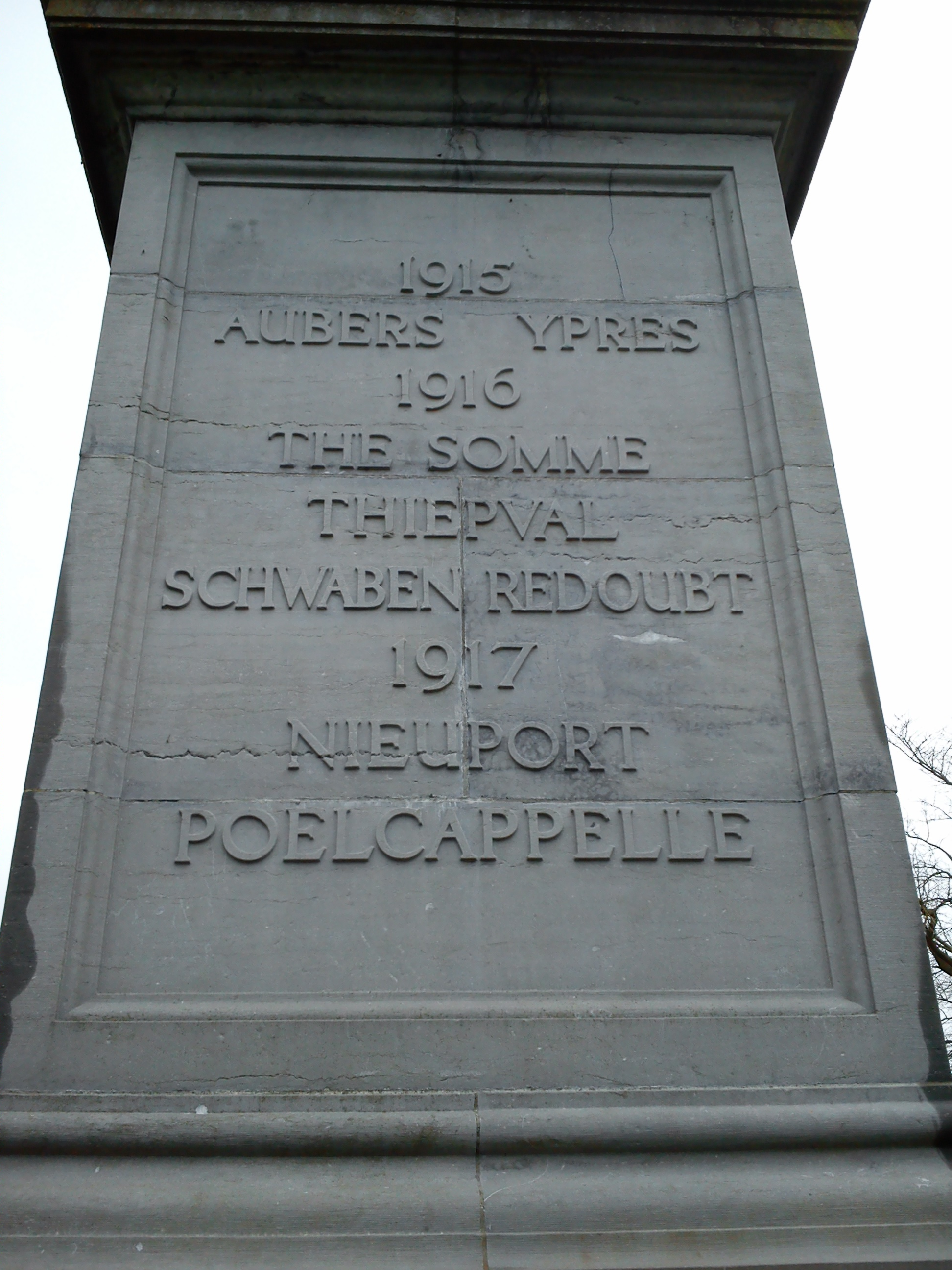
49th Infantry Division Memorial, front inscription

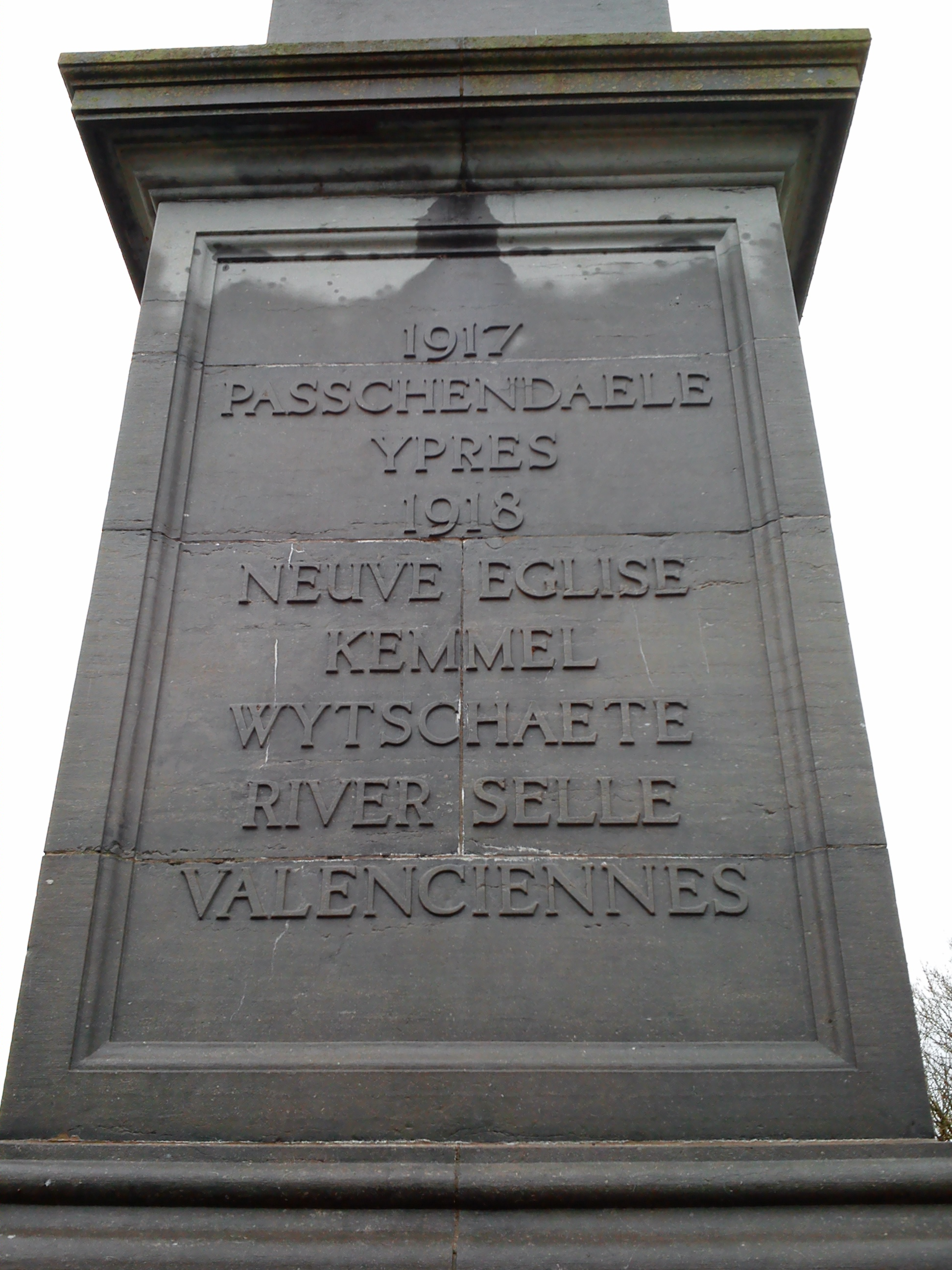
49th Infantry Division Memorial, back inscription

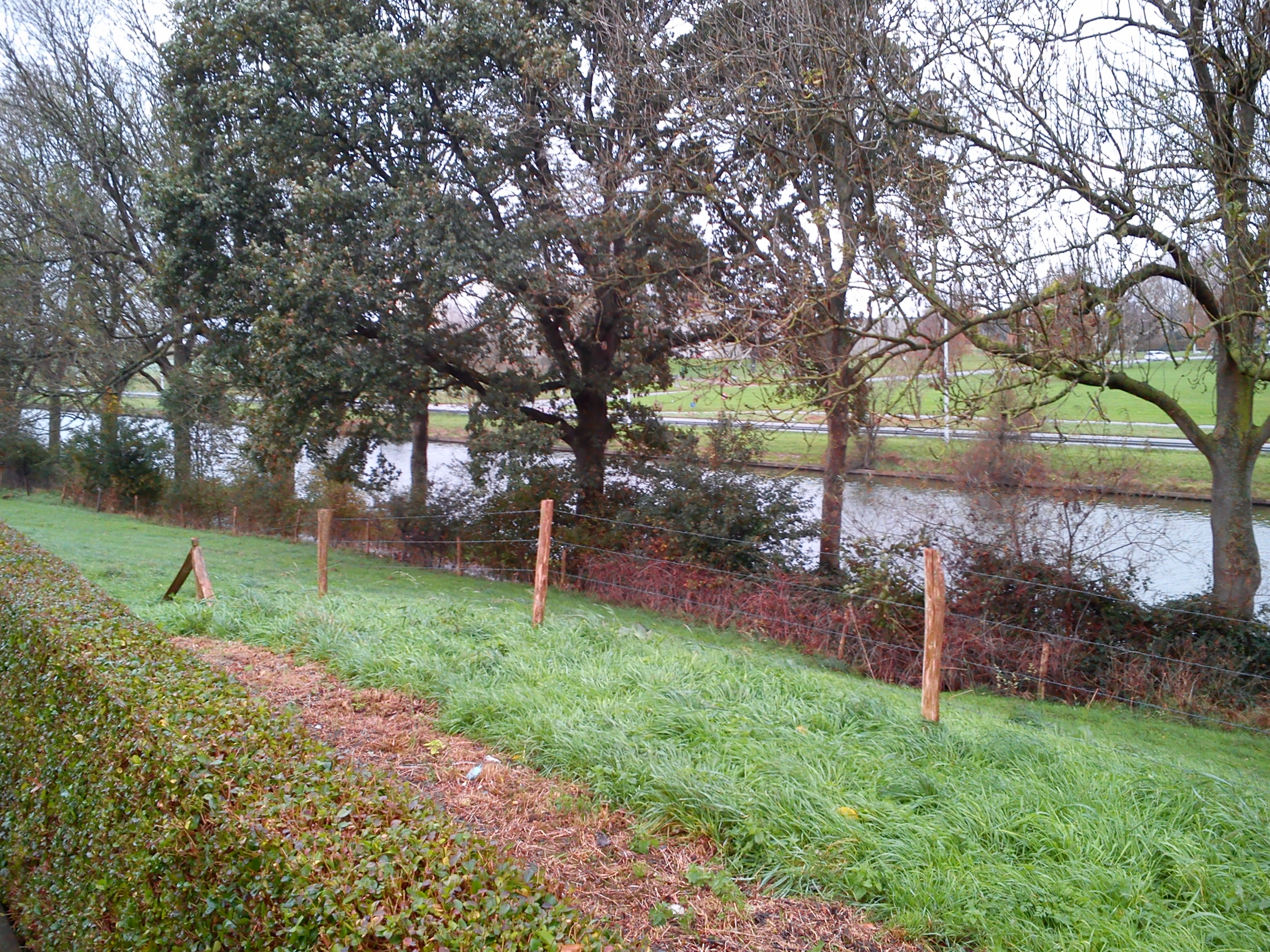
canal dyke behind the 49th Infantry Division Memorial

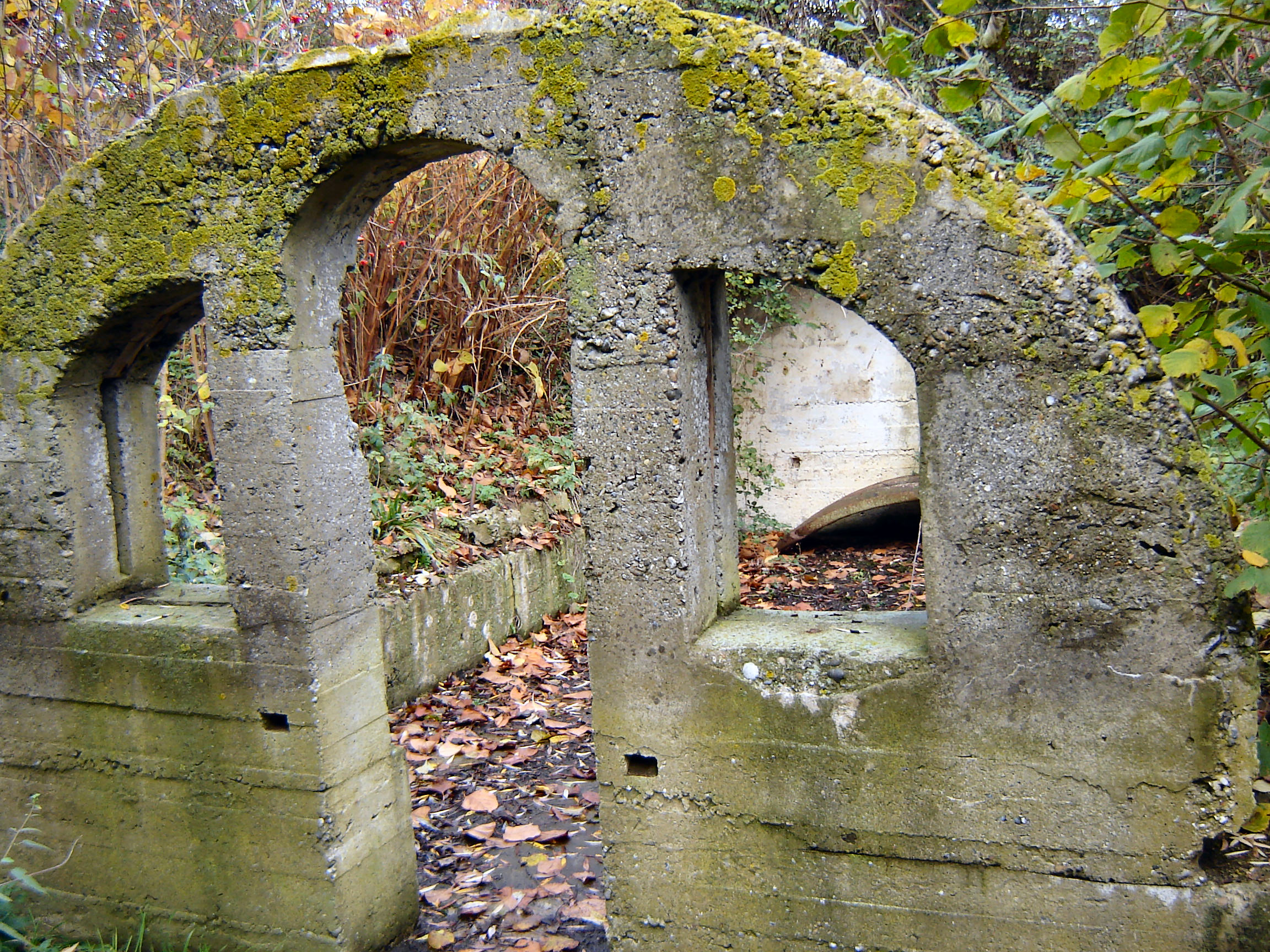
Ruins of Belgian emergency housing

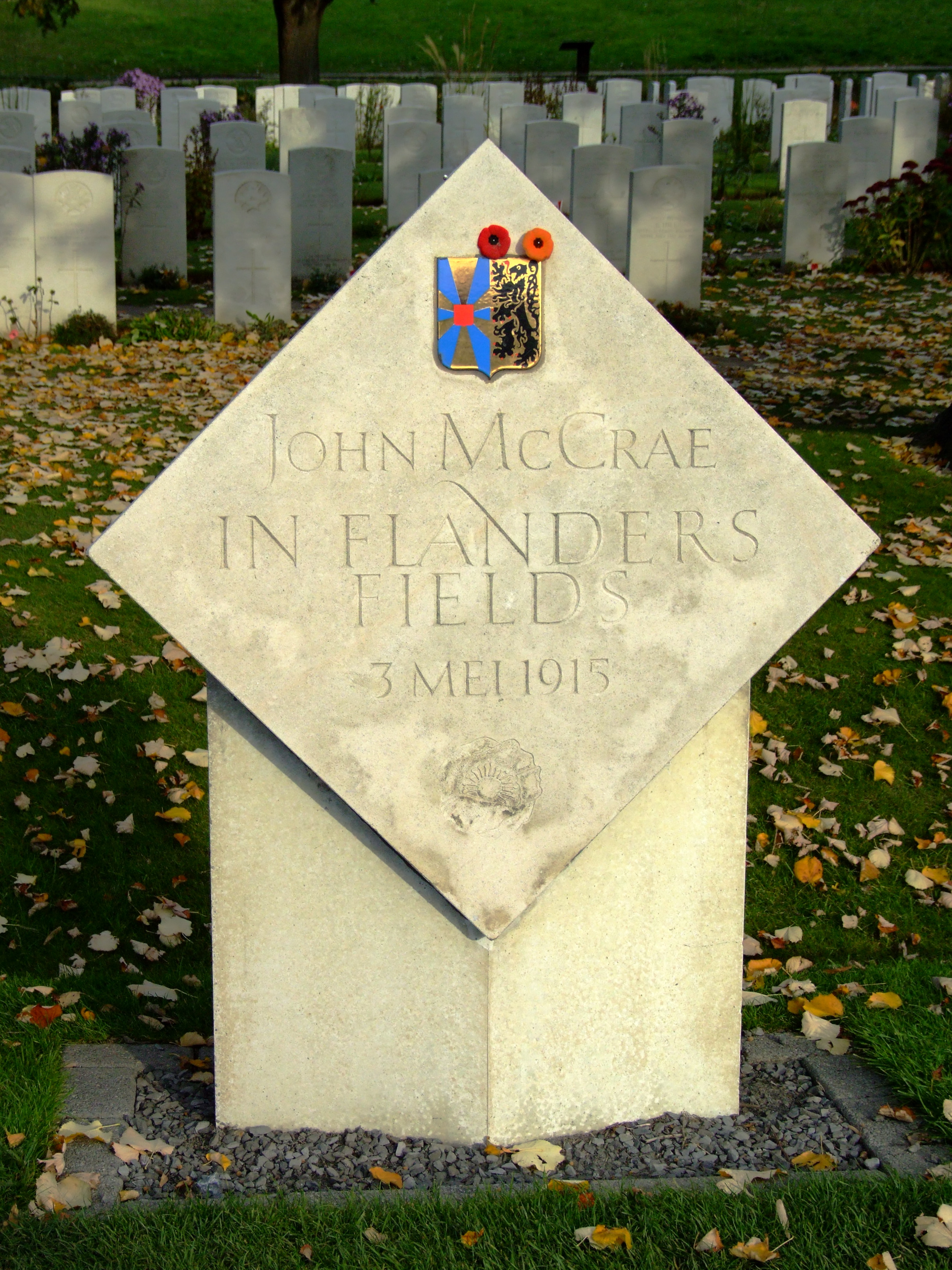
In Flanders Fields Albertina Marker-plaque off Diksmuidseweg

== See also ==
- List of World War I memorials and cemeteries in Flanders
