= Essex Farm Cemetery =

World War I military burial ground in Belgium

- Commonwealth War Graves Commission
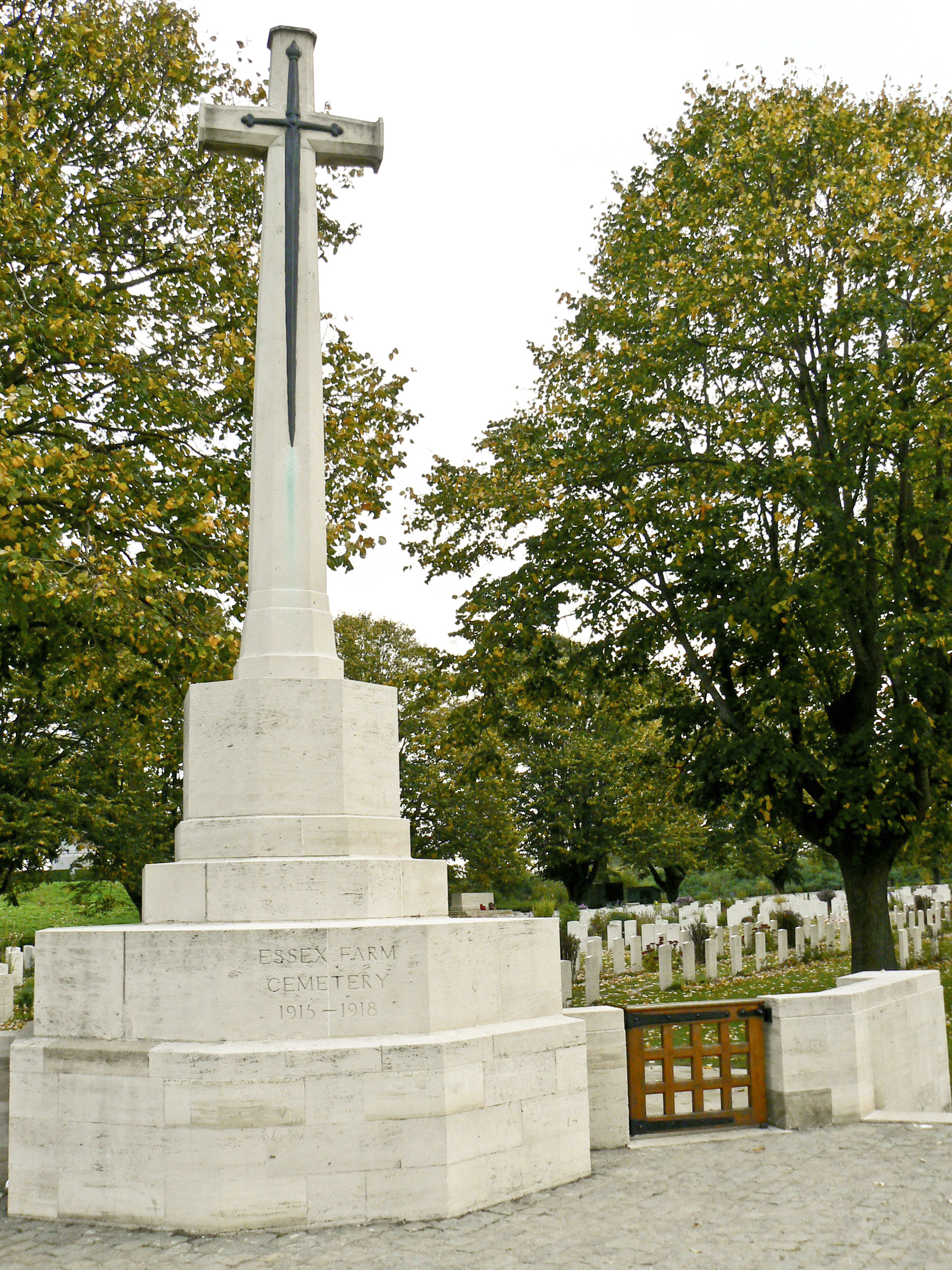
- Used for those deceased 1915–1917
- Established: 1915
- Location: 50°52′15″N 02°52′23″E near Ypres, West Flanders, Belgium
- Designed by: Sir Reginald Blomfield
- Total burials: 1100
- Unknowns: 104

UNESCO World Heritage Site
- Official name: Funerary and memory sites of the First World War (Western Front)
- Type: Cultural
- Criteria: i, ii, vi
- Designated: 2023 (45th session)
- Reference no.: 1567-FL11

Essex Farm Cemetery is a World War I, Commonwealth War Graves Commission burial ground within the John McCrae Memorial Site near Ypres, Belgium. There are 1,204 dead commemorated, of which 104 are unidentified. The cemetery was designed by Sir Reginald Blomfield and has an area of 6,032 square metres (64,930 sq ft).

== Location ==
The cemetery is located within the John McCrae Memorial Site, halfway between the center of Ypres and the center of Boezinge, about 2.5 km from each. The cemetery is located at Site John McCrae, between Diksmuidseweg (N369) and the Ieperlee (Ypres Canal), half a kilometer north of Duhallow ADS Cemetery and half a kilometer south of Bard Cottage Cemetery, also near the Diksmuidseweg and channel. In the northwest corner of the site is the Cross of Sacrifice, on the east side of the Stone of Remembrance.

== History ==
The cemetery was established next to a dressing station established by the Canadian Field Artillery during the Second Battle of Ypres, on farmland which was unnamed on pre-war maps; the dressing station was operational from early 1915 until 1918. The name "Essex Farm" commemorates the Essex Regiment, perhaps because a soldier of the 2nd Battalion of the Essex Regiment was an early interment there in June 1915. Twenty eight members of the 11th Battalion of the Essex Regiment were also buried there during 1916. A monument in the cemetery commemorates the composition of the war poem In Flanders Fields which is reported to have been written in May 1915 by Lieutenant Colonel John McCrae MD, after witnessing the burial of his friend, Lieutenant Alexis Helmer, of the 2nd Battery, 1st Brigade Canadian Field Artillery, at Essex Farm; Helmer's grave is now lost.

== Notable burials ==
- Thomas Barratt (1895–1917) who was awarded the Victoria Cross in 1917 while on scout patrol, where he showed conspicuous bravery under fire, stalking and killing enemy snipers, allowing his comrades to successfully change their foothold; he was killed by an artillery shell at the end of that engagement.
- Valentine Strudwick (1900–1916), who died at the age of 15. His local paper wrote, 'Pte Valentine Joe Strudwick of the 8th Rifle Brigade, joined up twelve months ago, and at the time of his death...had not reached his sixteenth birthday... a fine example to those of maturer years who have not yet joined up...'

== Gallery ==
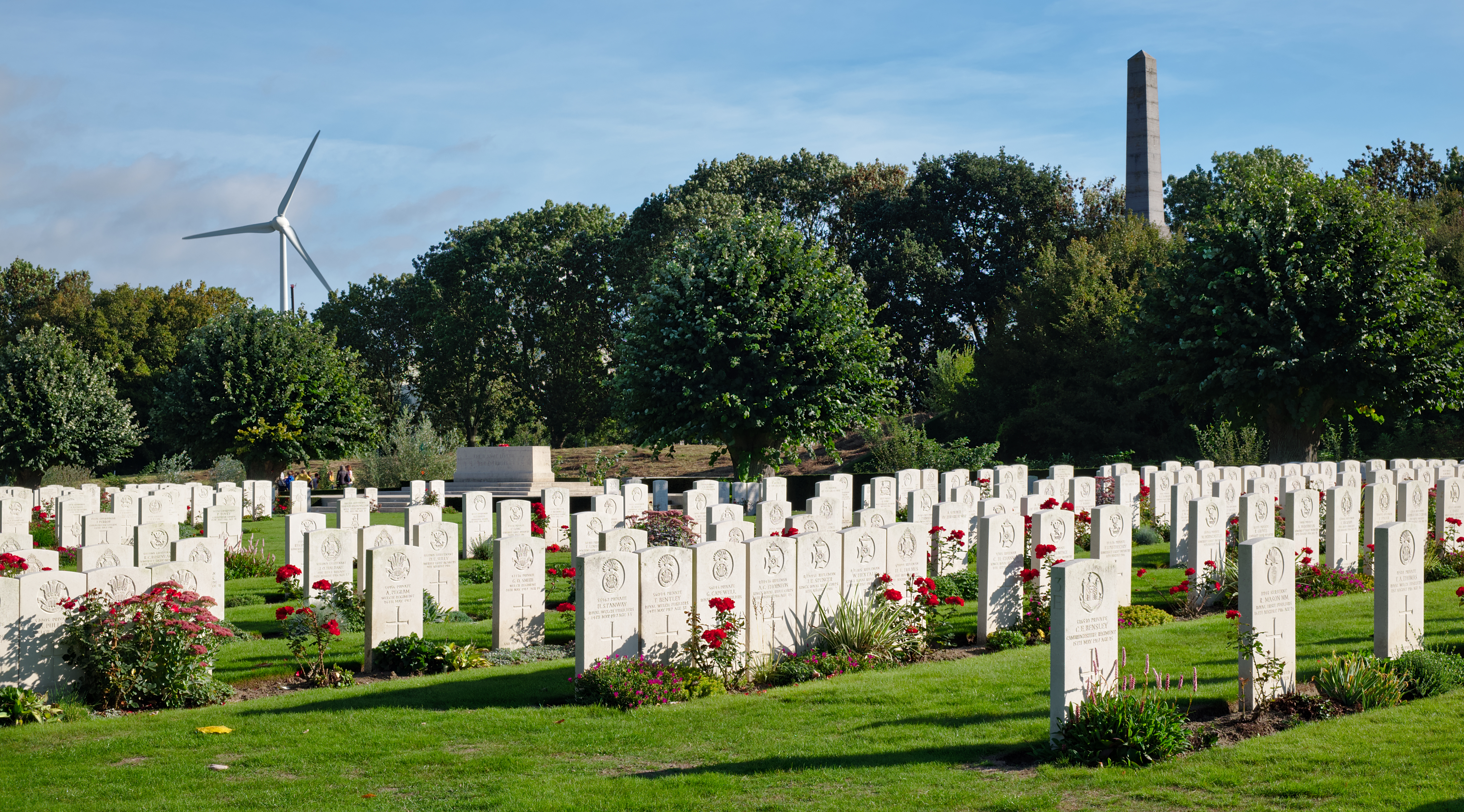
Essex Farm CWGC Cemetery

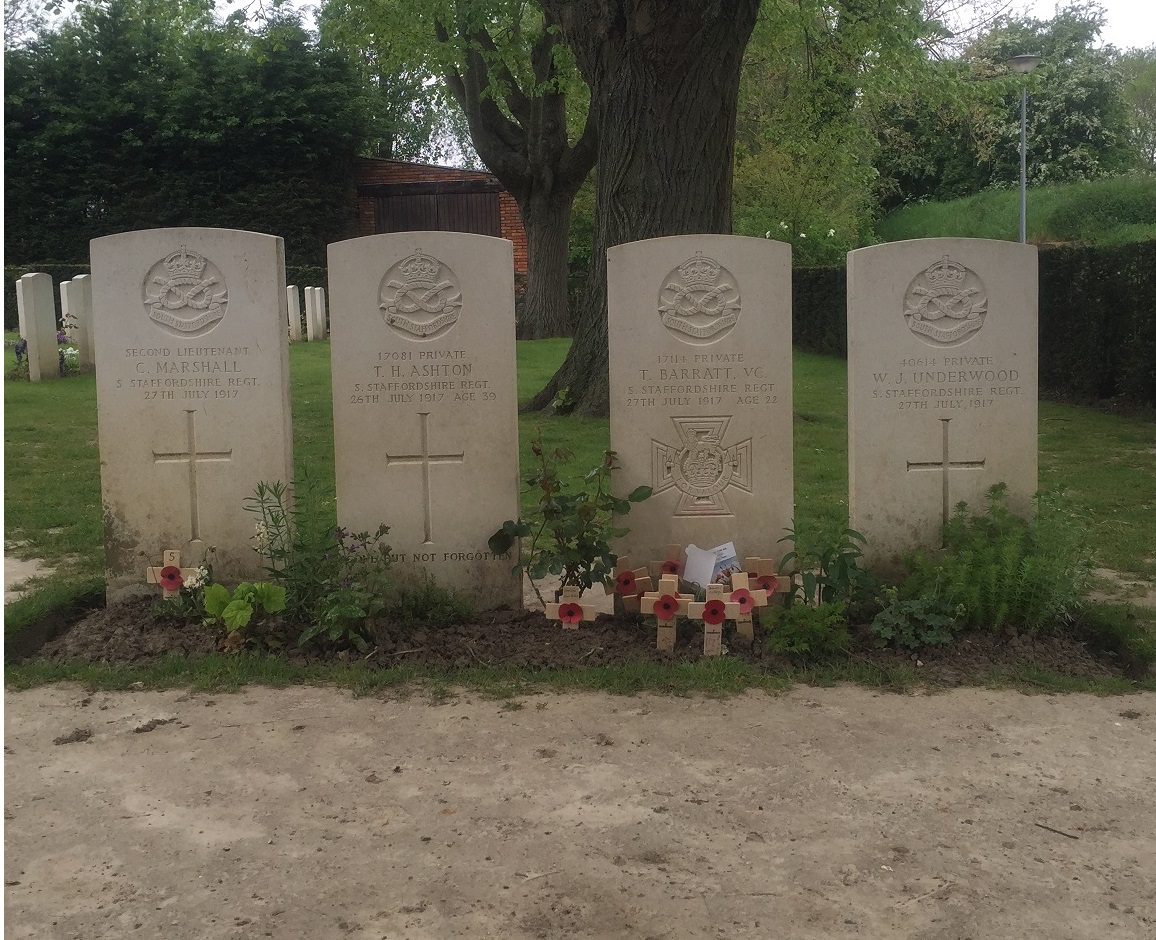
T. Barratt VC and other graves

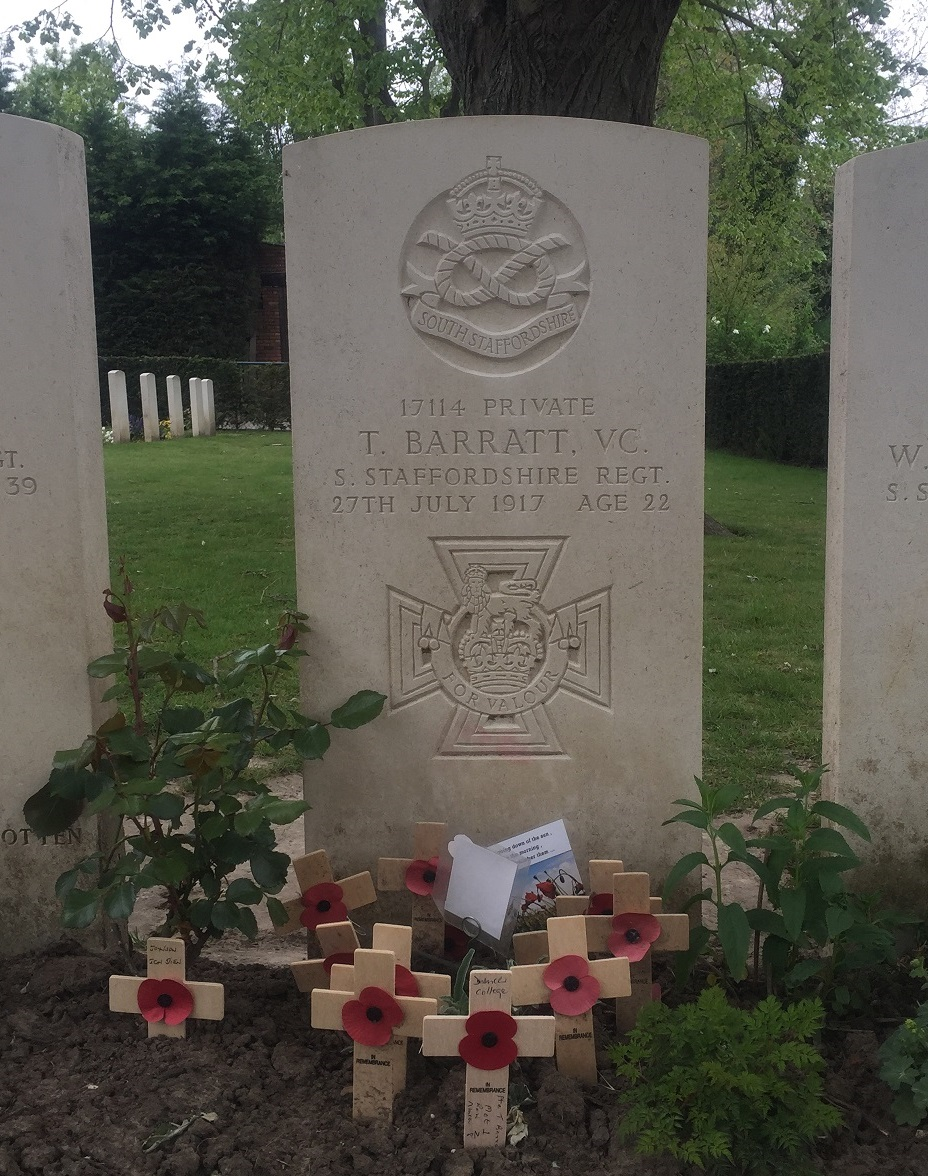
Grave of T. Barratt VC (1895–1917)

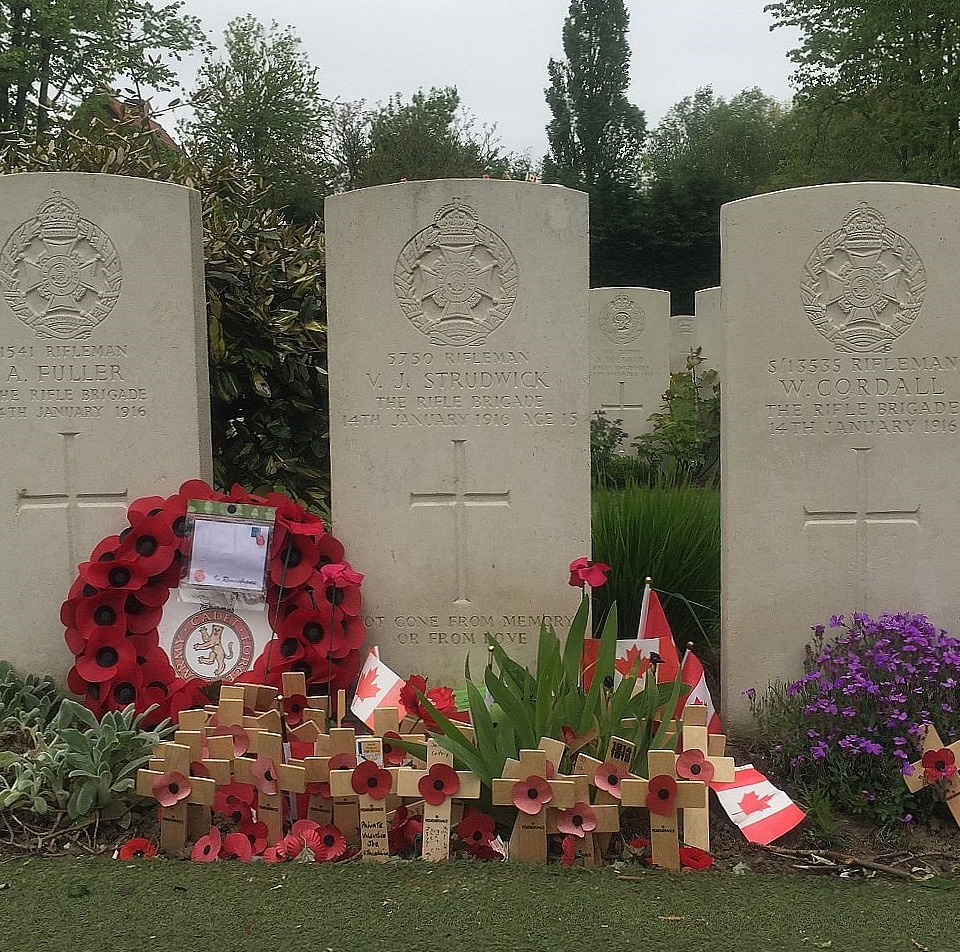
Grave of V. Strudwick (1900–1916)

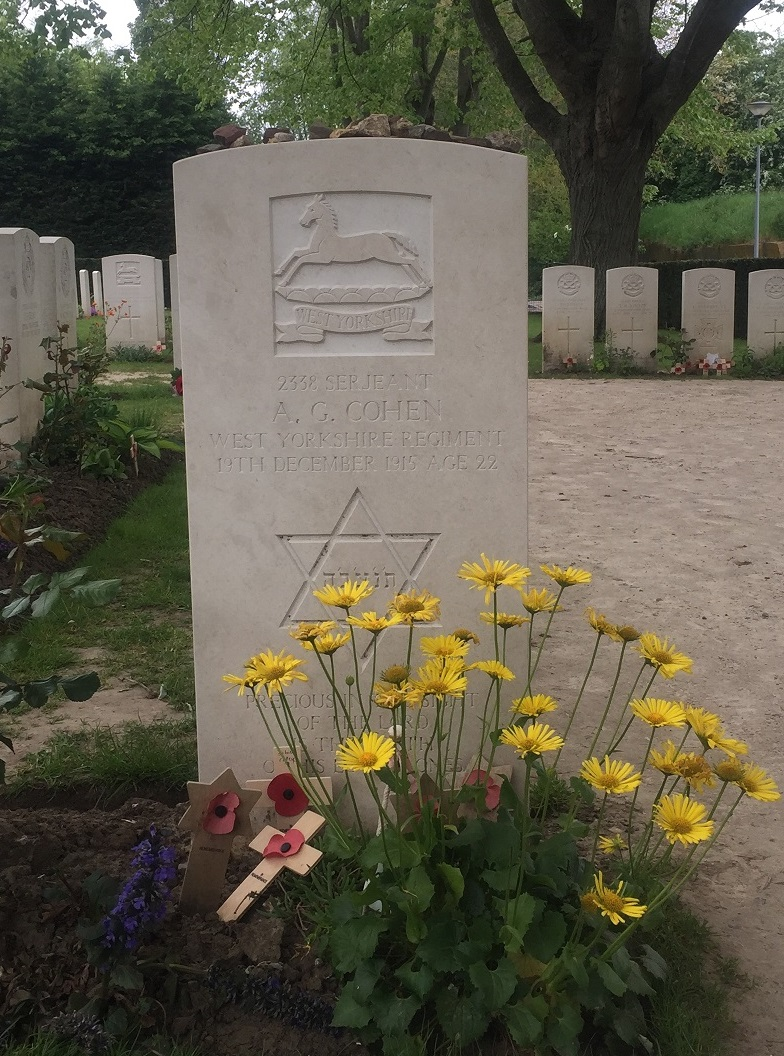
Grave of A.G. Cohen

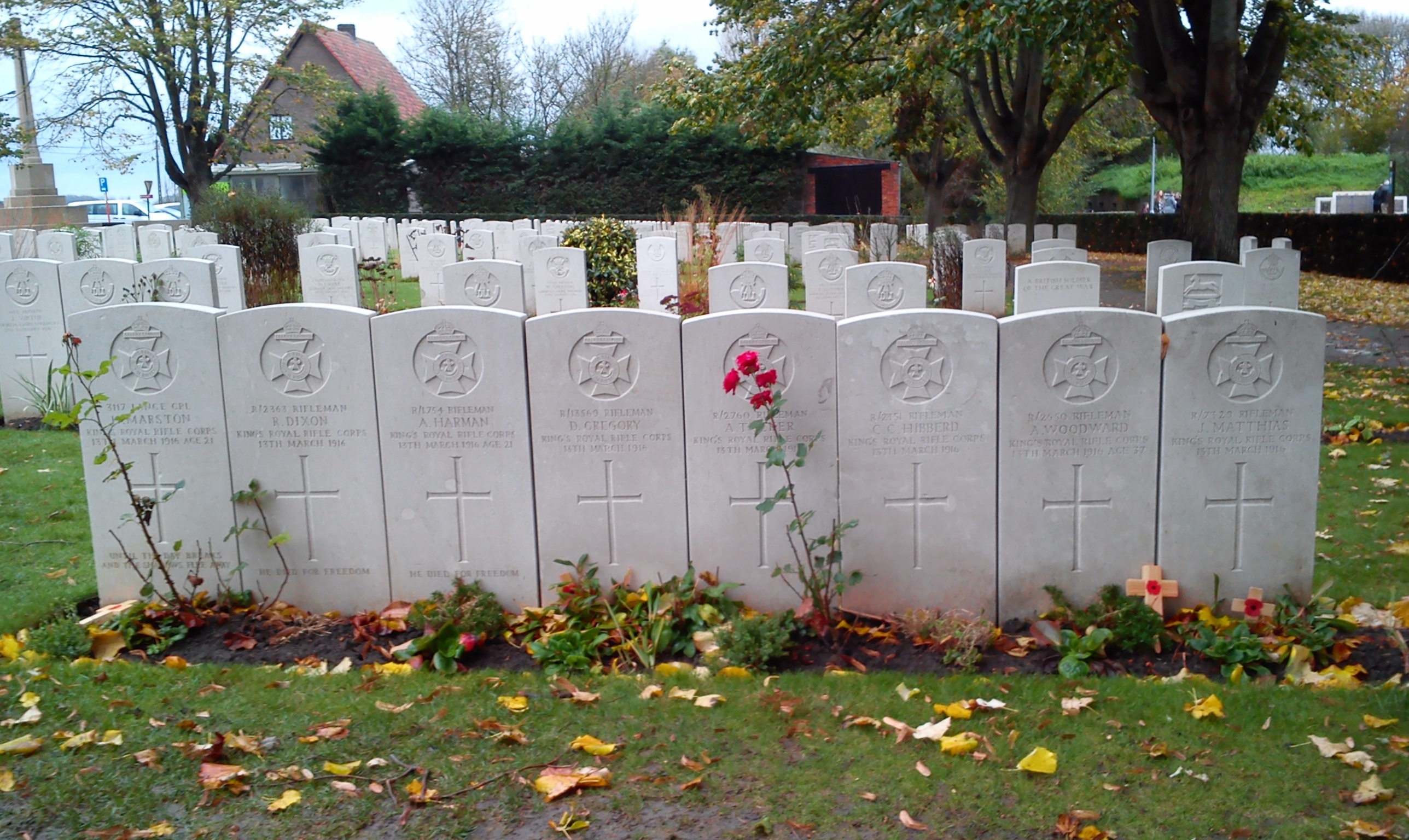
Eight men of the same unit, all killed the same day

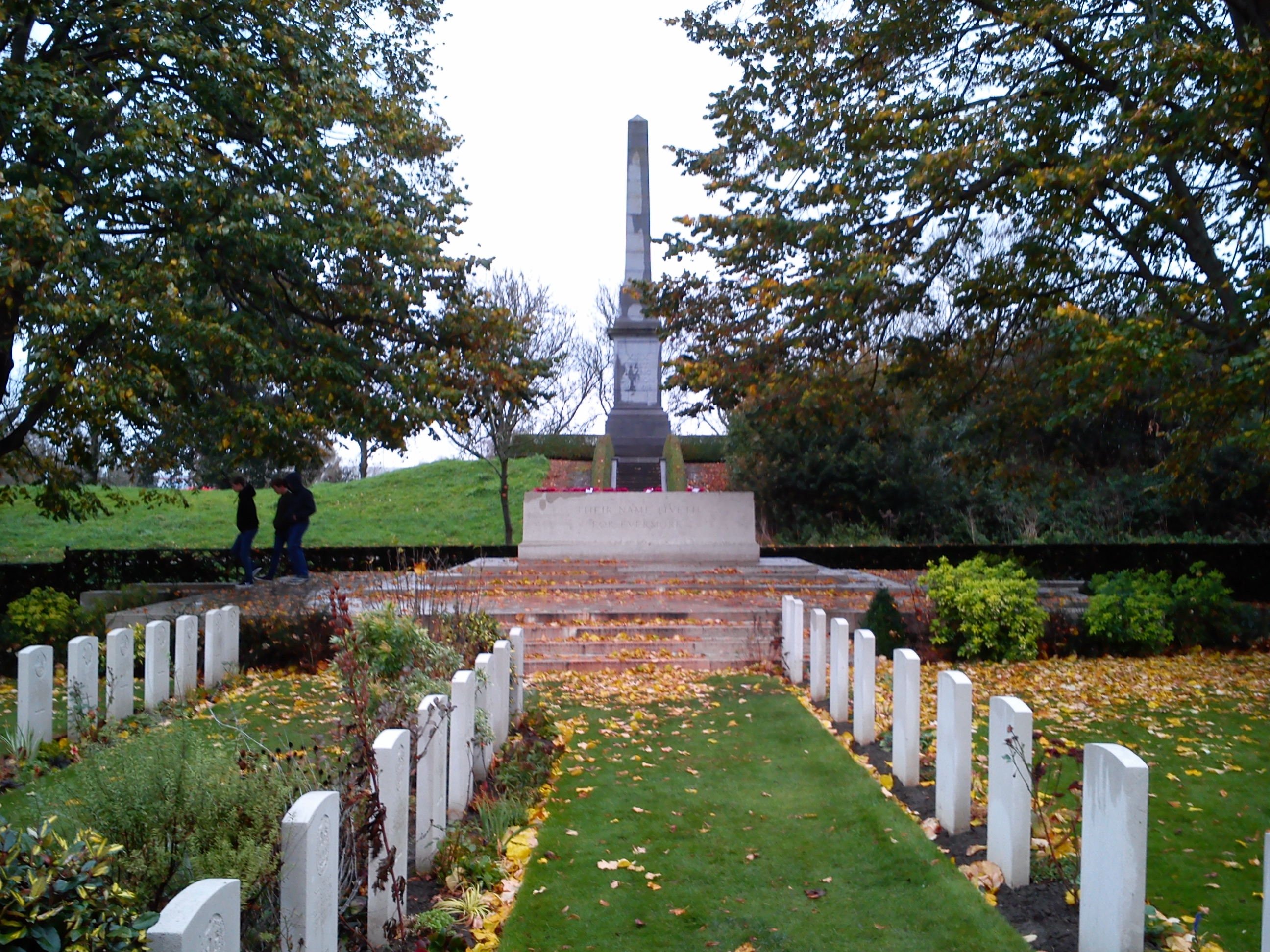
Essex Farm CWGC Cemetery and 49th Infantry Division Memorial at Site John McCrae

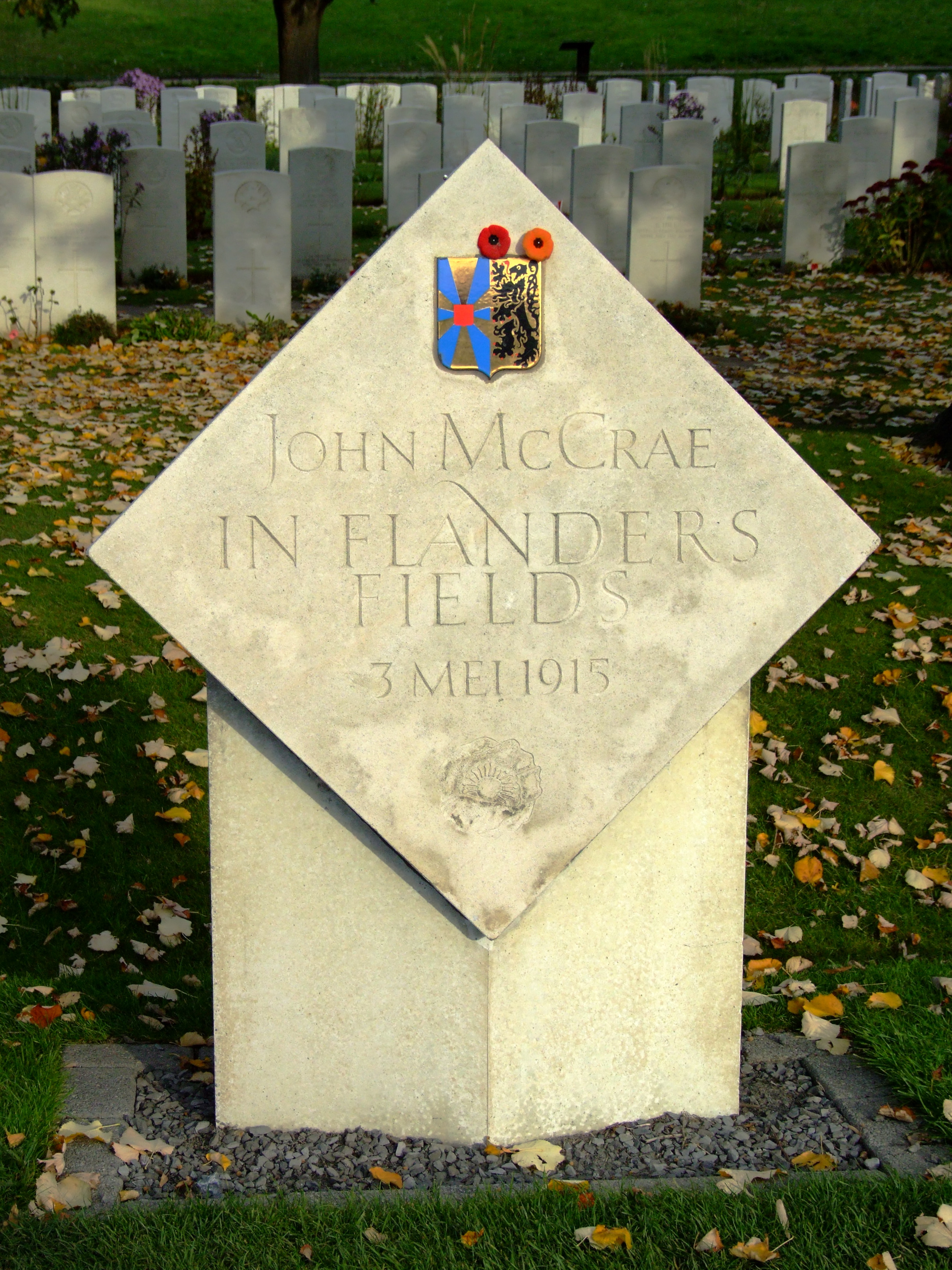
The monument commemorating In Flanders Fields, written by John McCrae at Essex Farm in May 1915
