= Valentine Strudwick =

British Army soldier

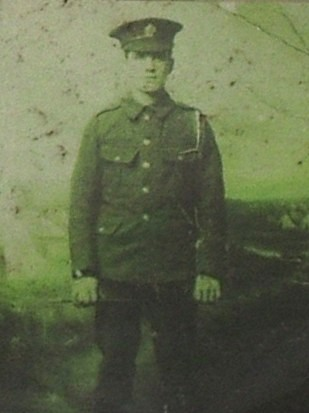
- Strudwick in 1915 or 1916
- Born: Valentine Joseph Strudwick; 14 February 1900; Dorking, England
- Died: 14 January 1916 (aged 15); Boezinge, Belgium
- Burial place: Essex Farm Cemetery
- Military career
- Allegiance: United Kingdom
- Branch: British Army
- Service years: 1915–1916
- Rank: Rifleman
- Service number: 5750
- Unit: Rifle Brigade
- Conflicts: First World War †

Valentine Joseph Strudwick (14 February 1900 – 14 January 1916), also known as Joe Strudwick or Valentine Joe Strudwick, was a British soldier who was killed in the First World War. He enlisted when he was 14 years old and was one of the youngest soldiers to die in the war, aged 15.

== Biography ==
=== Early life ===
Strudwick was born in Dorking on Valentine's Day 1900 to laundress Louisa Strudwick and gardener Jesse Strudwick, receiving his name from the holiday. He lived with his parents and five siblings in Orchard Road. He attended at St Paul's School, but left school at the age of 13 to work at a brewery in Croydon, according to his father.

=== Military service ===
In January 1915, aged 14, Strudwick enlisted in the army to serve in the First World War, falsely claiming to be 18. (Note: Strudwick's father claimed his son enlisted in October 1914.) His father said that he had walked from his home to London to enlist but was initially refused. He later returned and was accepted. After six weeks of training, he was sent to the Western Front, disembarking in France on 12 August 1915 as a rifleman in the 8th Battalion, Rifle Brigade. Shortly after arriving, two of his friends were killed in action and Strudwick was gassed. He recovered in Sheerness for three months before returning to combat. On 14 January 1916, one month before his 16th birthday, Strudwick was killed by a shell near Boezinge, Belgium. He was buried at Essex Farm Cemetery.

== Commemoration ==
In 1938, the Ottawa Citizen claimed that Strudwick was the youngest British soldier to have died in the First World War. This claim was often repeated, but multiple younger soldiers who were killed in the war have been confirmed by historians, such as Aubrey Hudson and Robert Barnett, both killed aged 15.

Strudwick's grave at Essex Farm Cemetery is often visited by British school groups touring the Ypres Salient, who leave remembrance poppies and Royal British Legion wooden crosses in his memory. Strudwick is also remembered on Dorking's war memorial and at St Paul's Church, close to St Paul's School, where students were taught about him during the First World War centenary.

The book Valentine Joe by Rebecca Stevens, published in 2014, is loosely based on Strudwick's life and was written for teenage readers.

== See also ==
- Youngest British soldier in World War I
