= Nimmy March =

British actress (born 1962)

Lady Naomi Gordon-Lennox
- Born: March 1962 (age 64); Kingston upon Thames, England
- Other name: Nimmy March
- Occupation: Actress
- Spouse: Gavin Burke (m. 1999; div.)
- Children: 3
- Parent(s): By adoption: Charles Gordon-Lennox, 10th Duke of Richmond; Susan Grenville-Grey

Lady Naomi Anna Gordon-Lennox (born March 1962), known as Nimmy March, is an English actress.

== Background ==
March's biological parents were a father from Lesotho and an English mother. As an illegitimate child, she was abandoned by her birth mother.

She was adopted by the Earl and Countess of March and Kinrara, who later became the Duke and Duchess of Richmond. Because of her race, at the time the adoption caused a stir within the peerage and the future Duke and Duchess were vilified by some for "sullying the aristocracy", as March herself described it.

She went to Bedales, an exclusive Hampshire school, before going on to drama school.

== Career ==
March's television screen credits include Coronation Street, Albion Market, Common As Muck, Goodnight Sweetheart, Casualty, William and Mary, Doctors, Strictly Confidential, The Bill, London's Burning, Waking the Dead, Death in Paradise, Beyond Paradise, Agatha Raisin, Desmond's and Emmerdale.

She narrated the 2008 TV serial Last Voices of World War 1 on the History Channel, along with the BBC1 documentary The War On Loan Sharks.

== Personal life ==
Until 2004, children who were adopted by peers had no right to any noble or courtesy title. However, as a result of a Royal Warrant dated 30 April 2004, all children are now automatically entitled to the same styles and courtesy titles. Therefore, on that date, she became Lady Naomi Burke.

She married Gavin Burke in 1999, but they subsequently divorced. They have three children: Khaya (born 1999), Malachy (born 2001), and Carlotta (born 2005).

She has four siblings, including a sister who is also mixed-race. She is Buddhist and bisexual.
