= Bard Cottage Cemetery =

CWGC cemetery in Ypres, Belgium

Coordinates: 50.8764°N 2.8685°E

Bethune Town Cemetery
- Commonwealth War Graves Commission
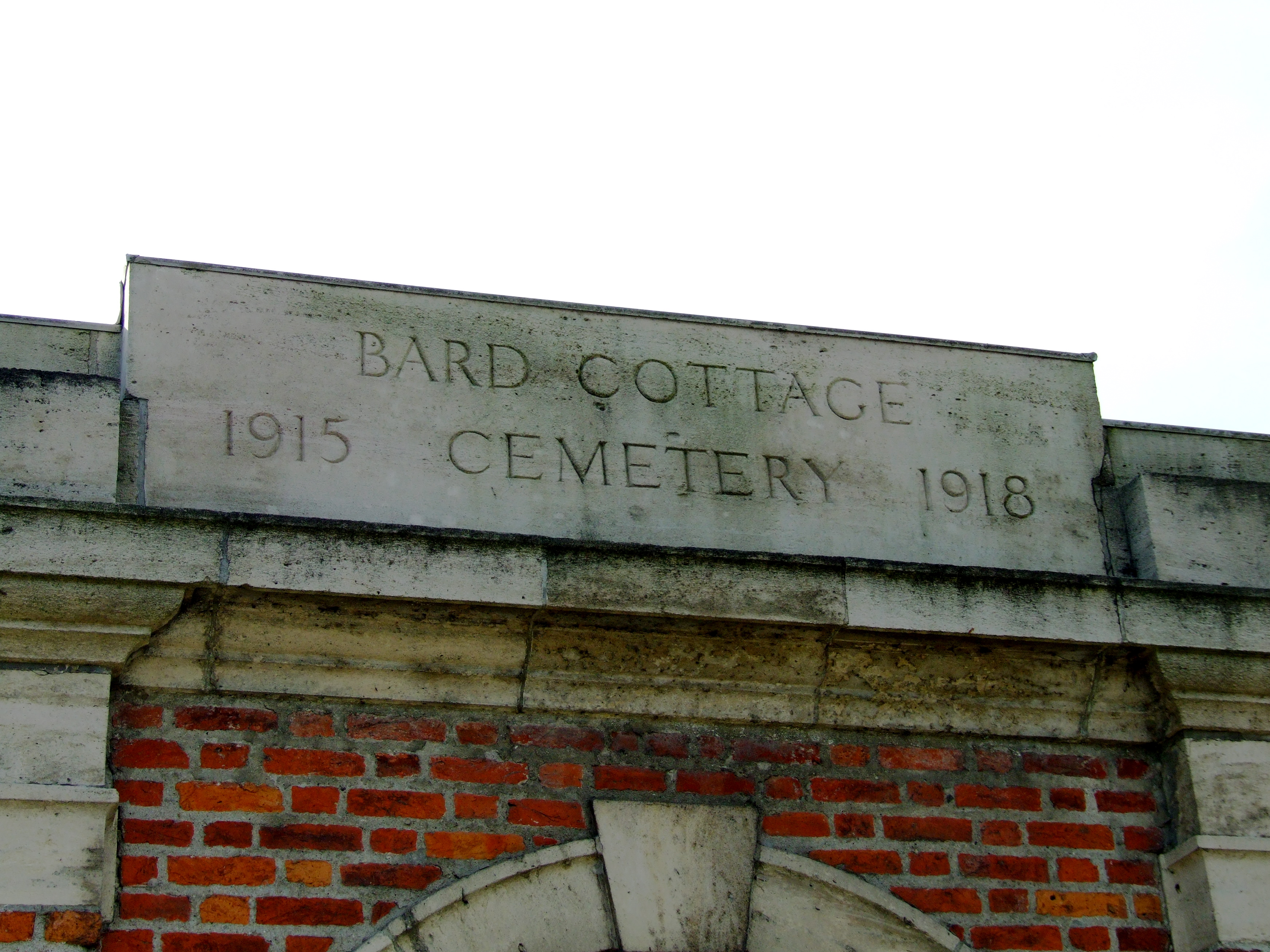
- The entrance stone to the cemetery
- Used for those deceased
- Established: 1918
- Location: near Ypres, Belgium
- Total burials: 1,607

Bard Cottage Cemetery is a World War I, Commonwealth War Graves Commission burial ground near Ypres, Belgium. It is home to 1,607 identified casualties. The cemetery is half a kilometre north of Essex Farm Cemetery.

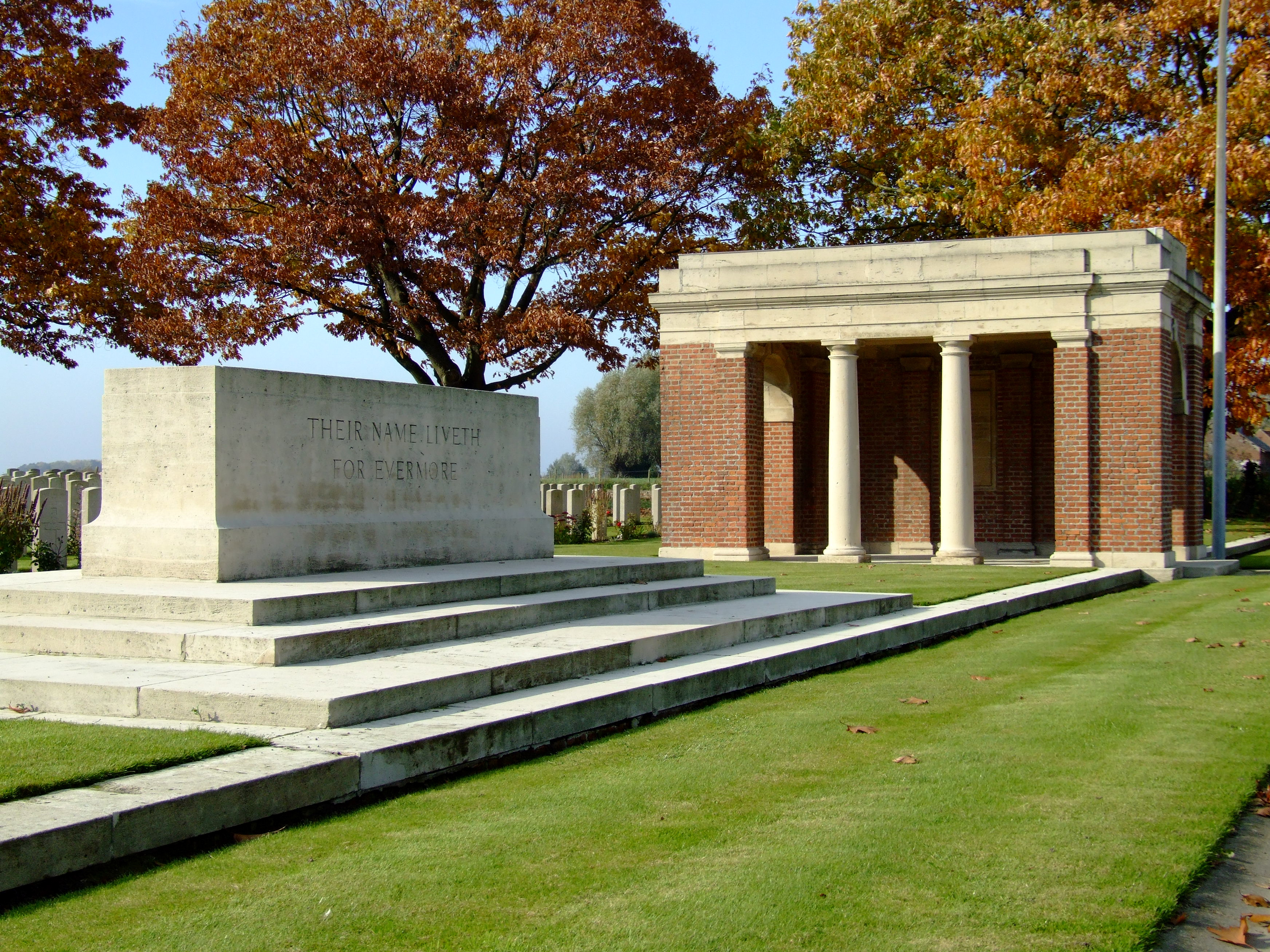
The Stone of Remembrance.

== Casualties by Unit ==
This list includes all identified casualties within the cemetery, Imperial Units are given in bold.

Royal Field Artillery: 167	Royal Garrison Artillery: 161
Royal Welch Fusiliers: 136	Welch Regiment: 117
King's Yorkshire Light Infantry: 94	Royal Engineers: 91
York and Lancaster Regiment: 88	Duke of Wellington's Regiment: 62
King's Regiment: 49	Durham Light Infantry: 40
Machine Gun Corps: 38	Monmouthshire Regiment: 38
Seaforth Highlanders: 34	Northumberland Fusiliers: 29
Royal Dublin Fusiliers: 28	Lancashire Fusiliers: 27
South Wales Borderers: 27	Rifle Brigade: 25
Royal Army Medical Corps: 19	King's Royal Rifle Corps: 16
Somerset Light Infantry: 15	Argyll and Sutherland Highlanders: 15
West Yorkshire Regiment: 14	Middlesex Regiment: 14
East Yorkshire Regiment: 14	Duke of Cornwall's Light Infantry: 13
Gordon Highlanders: 13	Honourable Artillery Company: 10
East Lancashire Regiment: 9	Army Service Corps: 8
Ox and Bucks Light Infantry: 8	Royal Fusiliers: 8
Royal Irish Rifles: 8	South Staffordshire Regiment: 7
Royal Inniskilling Fusiliers: 7	London Regiment: 7
Canadian Railway Troops: 7	Border Regiment: 6
Cheshire Regiment: 6	Hampshire Regiment: 6
Newfoundland Regiment: 6	Royal Warwickshire Regiment: 6
Loyal Regiment: 6	Queen's Royal Regiment: 6
Lincolnshire Regiment: 5	King's Shropshire Light Infantry: 5
King's Own Scottish Borderers: 5	Sherwood Foresters: 4
Worcestershire Regiment: 4	Dorsetshire Regiment: 4
Manchester Regiment: 4	Black Watch: 4
South Lancashire Regiment: 3	Essex Regiment: 3
Royal Naval Division: 3	Royal Irish Fusiliers: 3
Imperial German Army: 3	British West Indies Regiment: 3
Devonshire Regiment: 3	Royal Flying Corps: 3
Royal Sussex Regiment: 2	South African Heavy Artillery: 2
Canadian Labour Corps: 2	Army Cyclist Corps: 2
King's Own Royal Regiment: 2	Royal Berkshire Regiment: 2
Grenadier Guards: 2	Royal Scots: 2
Yorkshire Regiment: 2	Queen's Own Royal Regiment: 1
Yorkshire Hussars: 1	Tank Corps: 1
Royal Horse Artillery: 1	Cameron Highlanders: 1
Army Chaplains' Department: 1	King Edward's Horse: 1
Connaught Rangers: 1	East Surrey Regiment: 1
Household Battalion: 1	Cameronians: 1
Lancashire Hussars: 1	Royal Military Police: 1
Northamptonshire Regiment: 1	
