= Thomas Barratt (VC) =

Recipient of the Victoria Cross

- Born: 5 May 1895; Coseley, Staffordshire, England
- Died: 27 July 1917 (aged 22); Ypres Salient, near Ypres, Belgium
- Burial place: Essex Farm Cemetery, Boezinge
- Military career
- Allegiance: United Kingdom
- Branch: British Army
- Service years: 1911–1917 †
- Rank: Private
- Units: The South Staffordshire Regiment
- Conflicts: World War I: Western Front; Battle of Messines †
- Awards: Victoria Cross

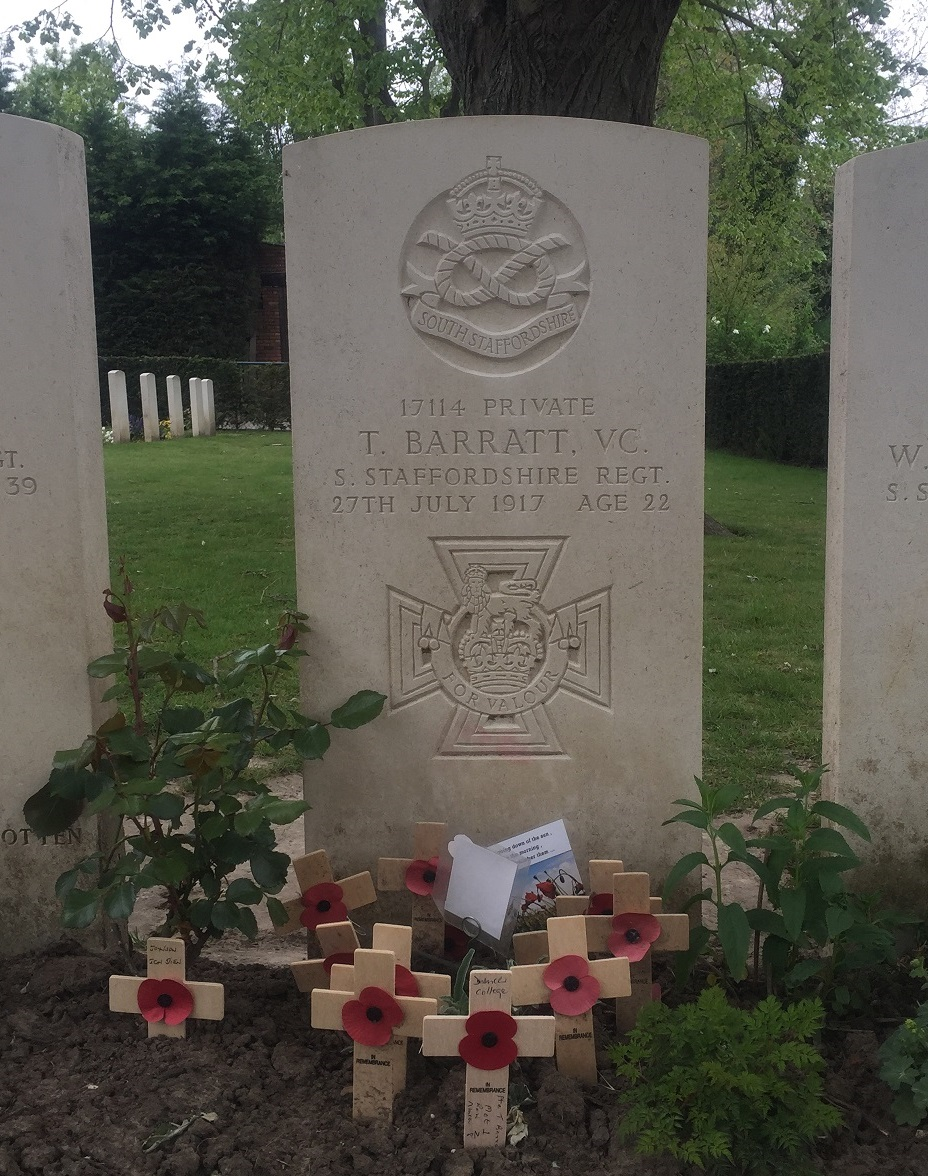
Thomas Barratt's headstone in Essex Farm cemetery.

Thomas Barratt VC (5 May 1895 – 27 July 1917) was an English recipient of the Victoria Cross, the highest and most prestigious award for gallantry in the face of the enemy that can be awarded to British and Commonwealth forces.

Barratt was born on 5 May 1895 to James and Sarah Ann Barratt.

He was 22 years old, and a private in the 7th Battalion, The South Staffordshire Regiment, British Army during the First World War when he performed the act for which he was awarded the VC and which led to his death on 27 July 1917 north of Ypres, Belgium

For most conspicuous bravery when as Scout to a patrol he worked his way towards the enemy line with the greatest gallantry and determination, in spite of continuous fire from hostile snipers at close range. These snipers he stalked and killed. Later his patrol was similarly held up, and again he disposed of the snipers. When during the subsequent withdrawal of the patrol it was observed that a party of the enemy were endeavouring to outflank them, Pte. Barratt at once volunteered to cover the retirement, and this he succeeded in accomplishing. His accurate shooting caused many casualties to the enemy, and prevented their advance. Throughout the enterprise he was under heavy machine gun and rifle fire, and his splendid example of coolness and daring was beyond all praise. After safely regaining our lines, this very gallant soldier was killed by a shell.

— The London Gazette, No. 30272, 4 September 1917

His Victoria Cross is displayed at the Staffordshire Regiment Museum, Whittington Barracks, Lichfield, Staffordshire, England.

He was commemorated in Tipton by a block of flats being named Barratt Court. When these flats were renovated the plaque erected in his memory went missing. A replacement plaque was unveiled at a ceremony in May 2012.

== Bibliography ==
- Gliddon, Gerald (2012). Arras and Messines 1917. VCs of the First World War. The History Press. ISBN 978-0-7524-6604-0.
