= Momčilo Gavrić =

Momčilo Gavrić may refer to:

- Momčilo Gavrić (soldier) (1906–1993), youngest soldier in World War I
- Momčilo Gavrić (footballer) (1938–2010), Yugoslav and American footballer
