= Last Voices of World War 1 =

Television series

The Last Voices of World War 1 is a six-part series screened on The History Channel in the UK from 9 November 2008 to 14 December 2008 with a repeat during the week. Its initial episode was screened on Remembrance Sunday 2008. The series was made by Testimony Films.

- 9 November 2008 – The Call to Arms
- 16 November 2008 – The Battle of the Somme
- 23 November 2008 – Saving the Wounded
- 30 November 2008 – Horror in the Mud
- 7 December 2008 – The Home Front
- 14 December 2008 – The Boys of 1918

The show features interviews shot by Steve Humphries and Richard van Emden in the early 1990s with many of the then surviving veterans who were, at that stage, well into their 90s. All of these veterans have subsequently died.

Harry Patch appeared in episodes 4 and 6, Henry Allingham appeared in episode 4. George Littlefair of the Durham Light Infantry appeared in episode 1.

The series was narrated by the actress Nimmy March.

The series was screened by Channel 4 in the UK daily from 2 November 2009.

The music for this series is called "Passage of Time" and was written by Terry Devine-King.
