= 21 cm Versuchmörser 06 =

German howitzer

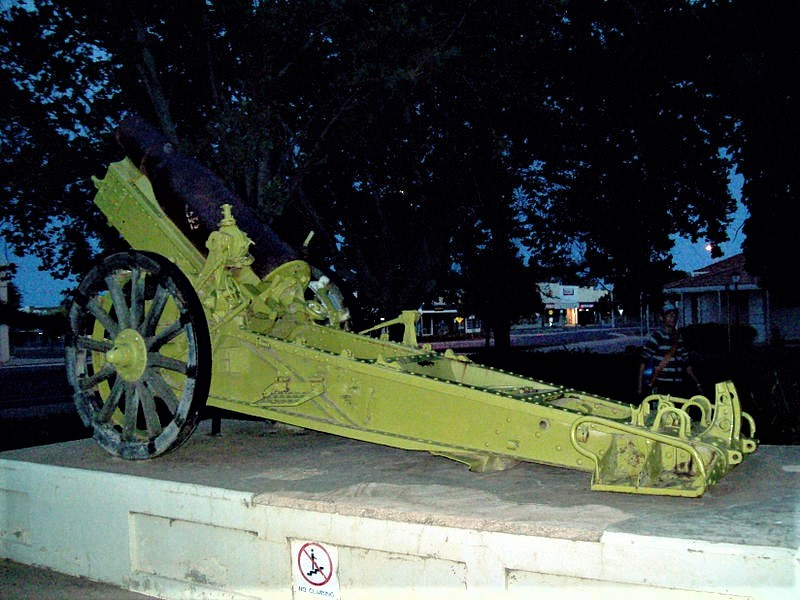
- A surrendered 21 cm Versuchmörser 06, Barclay Square Red Cliffs, Victoria
- Type: Howitzer
- Place of origin: German Empire

Service history
- In service: 1906–1918
- Used by: German Empire
- Wars: World War I

Production history
- Designer: Krupp
- Designed: 1899
- Manufacturer: Krupp
- Produced: 1903-1906

Specifications
- Mass: Travel: 8,188 kg (18,051 lb); Combat: 5,384 kg (11,870 lb)
- Barrel length: 2.1 m (6 ft 11 in) L/10
- Shell: Separate-loading, bagged charges and projectiles
- Shell weight: 119 kg (262 lb)
- Caliber: 211 mm (8.3 in)
- Breech: Horizontal sliding-block
- Recoil: Hydro-pneumatic
- Carriage: Box trail
- Elevation: +4° to +60°
- Traverse: 4°
- Rate of fire: 1 rpm
- Muzzle velocity: 288 m/s (940 ft/s)
- Maximum firing range: 7 km (4.3 mi)

The 21 cm Versuchmörser 06 was an experimental German howitzer that served in limited numbers during World War I.

== History ==
The 21 cm Versuchmörser 06 was designed in 1899 and built by Krupp in 1903-1906. The Versuchmörser 06 was a successor to earlier 21 cm weapons that had been in service since the Franco-Prussian War. The Versuchmörser 06 was fairly conventional for its time and most nations had similar weapons such as the French 220 mm TR mle 1915/1916 or British BL 8 inch Howitzer Mk 6 - 8.

== Design ==
The Versuchmörser 06 was a short barreled breech-loading howitzer on a two-wheeled box trail carriage with a hydro-pneumatic recoil mechanism. The gun had an early form of horizontal sliding-block breech and it fired separate-loading, bagged charges and projectiles.

The advantage the Versuchmörser 06 had over its predecessor the 21 cm Mörser 99 was its recoil mechanism raised its rate of fire from one round every three minutes to one round per minute. The 21 cm Mörser 99 required a piece of ground to be leveled and a wooden firing platform assembled before use. Two wooden ramps were then placed behind the wheels and when the mortar fired the wheels rolled up the ramp and was returned to position by gravity. A drawback of this system was that the gun had to be re-aimed each time, which lowered the rate of fire. However, the Versuchmörser 06 did not require as much site preparation and did not require re-aiming between shots.

Despite its advantages, the Versuchmörser 06 did not pass its acceptance tests and was not placed into mass production because the German Army required 9 km (5.6 mi) range and lighter weight which was later accomplished by the 21 cm Mörser 10. However, enough test models were produced to arm two four-gun batteries. To facilitate towing on soft ground the wheels were often fitted with Bonagente grousers patented by the Italian major Crispino Bonagente. These consisted of rectangular plates connected with elastic links and are visible in many photographs of World War I artillery from all of the combatants. For transport, the Versuchmörser 06 could be broken down into two separate wagon loads for the barrel and carriage. The barrel was towed on its own four-wheeled wagon with an integral hoist to mount/demount the barrel.
