= 21 cm Mörser 10 =

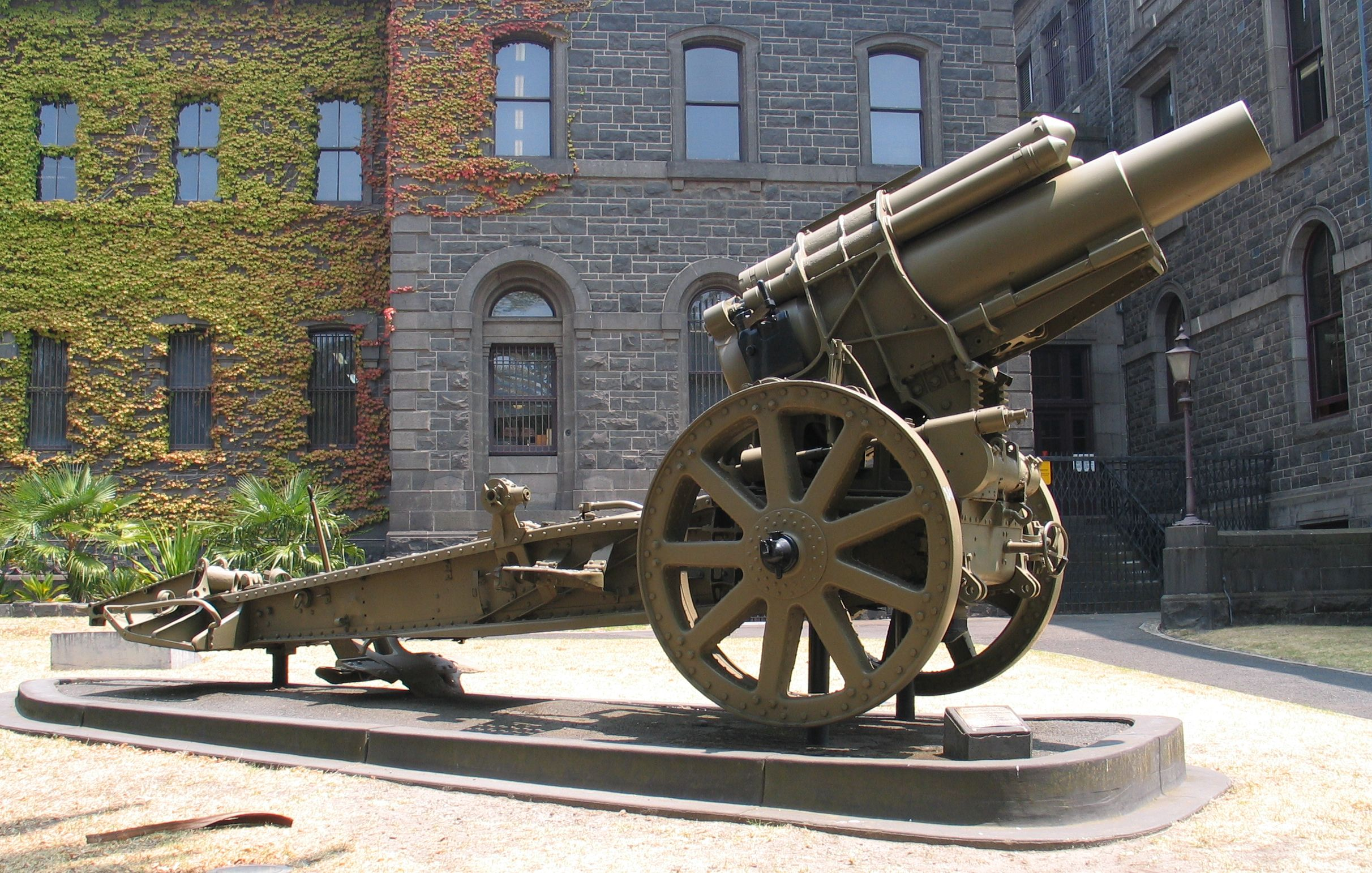
- 21 cm Mörser 10 near Victoria Barracks, Melbourne, Australia.
- Type: Howitzer
- Place of origin: German Empire

Service history
- In service: 1910
- Used by: German Empire
- Wars: World War I

Production history
- Designer: Krupp
- Designed: 1907–1910
- Produced: 1910

Specifications
- Mass: 15,496 lb (7,029 kg)
- Barrel length: 2.57 m (8 ft 5 in) L/12
- Shell: 252 pounds (114 kg)
- Caliber: 211 mm (8.3 in)
- Breech: horizontal sliding-wedge
- Recoil: hydro-pneumatic
- Carriage: box trail
- Elevation: -6° to +70°
- Traverse: 4°
- Muzzle velocity: 335 m/s (1,101 ft/s)
- Maximum firing range: 9,400 m (10,300 yd)

The 21 cm Mörser 10 (21 cm Mrs 10) was a heavy howitzer used by Germany in World War I (although classified as a mortar (Mörser) by the German military). It replaced the obsolete 21 cm Mörser 99, which lacked a recoil system. For transport, it broke down into two loads. Some howitzers were fitted with a gun shield during the war. As it was also intended for siege use, a concrete-penetrating shell was also used. Unusually, it had two spades: a folding one halfway down the trail and a fixed one at the end of the trail. Before the 21 cm Mörser 10 was commissioned for mass production, a small test series of 21 cm Versuchmörser 06 ("test mortar") was given to the German army. Eight pieces equipped two batteries, but their range of only 7 km was found insufficient, so the range was increased for the production version. Serial number 3 of these rare pieces is now exposed at Red Cliffs, Victoria. 216 were in service at the beginning of the war. It was replaced by the 21 cm Mörser 16, which was also known as the langer 21 cm Mörser since it was merely a lighter 21 cm Mrs 10 with a longer barrel for extra range and other refinements. The specifications provided for this weapon by difference sources are contradictory and, thus, those given here cannot be regarded as authoritative.

== Gallery ==
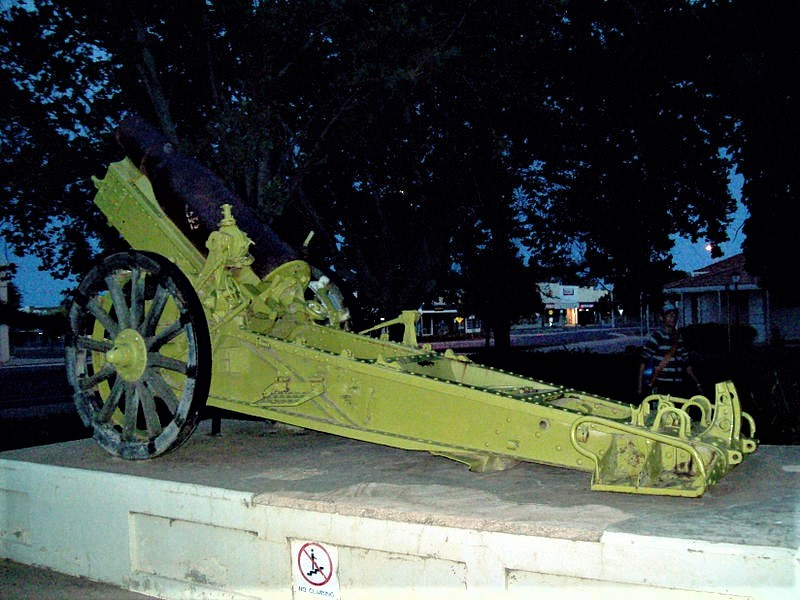
21 cm Versuchsmörser 06

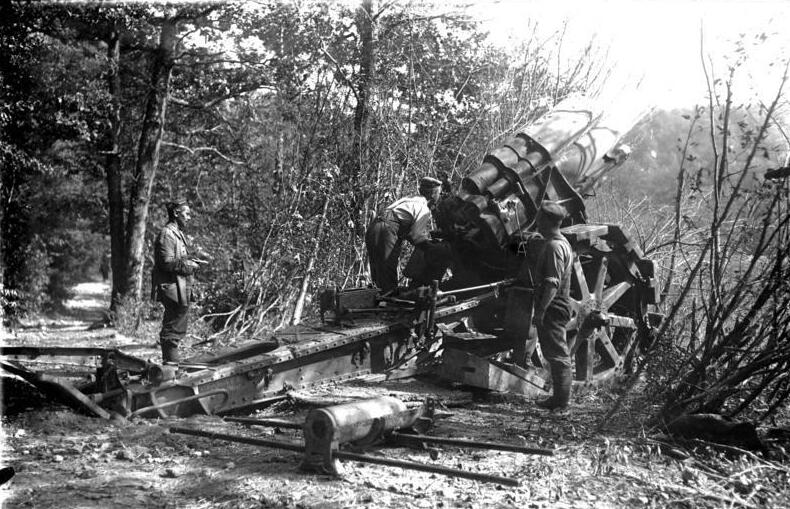
21 cm Mörser 10, July 1915

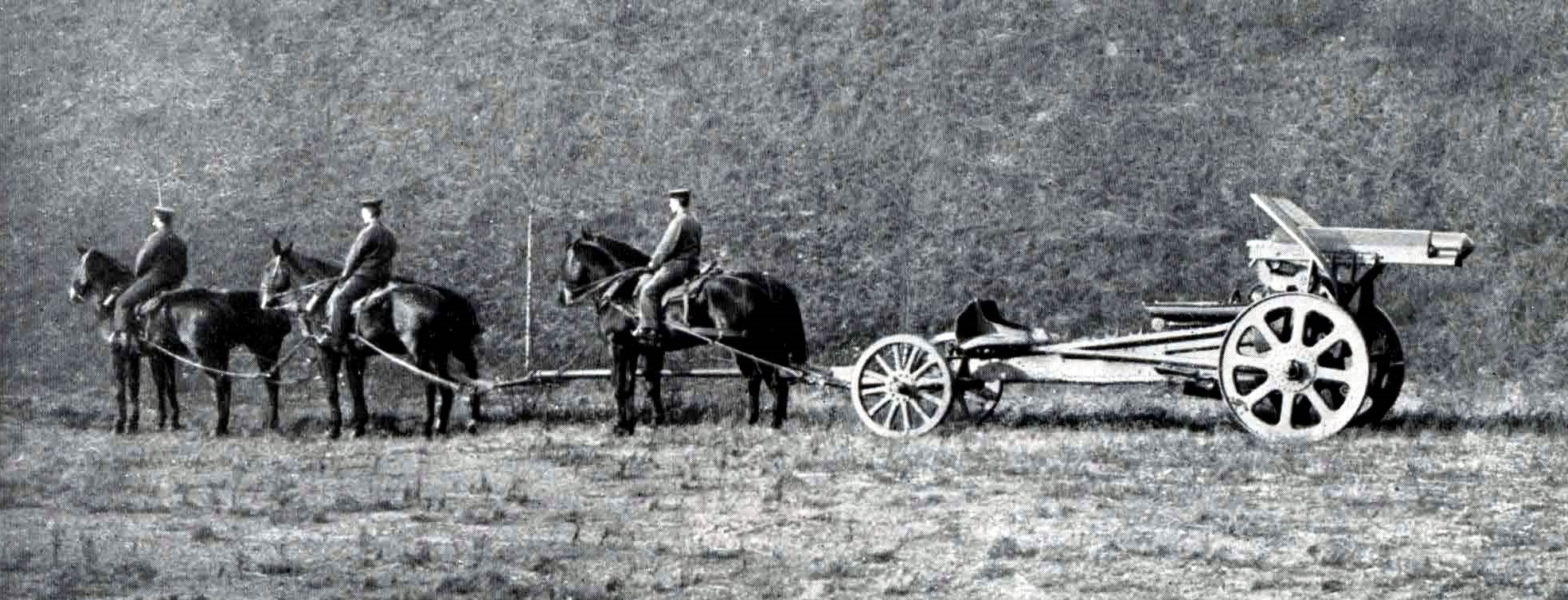
A 21 cm Mörser carriage being transported.

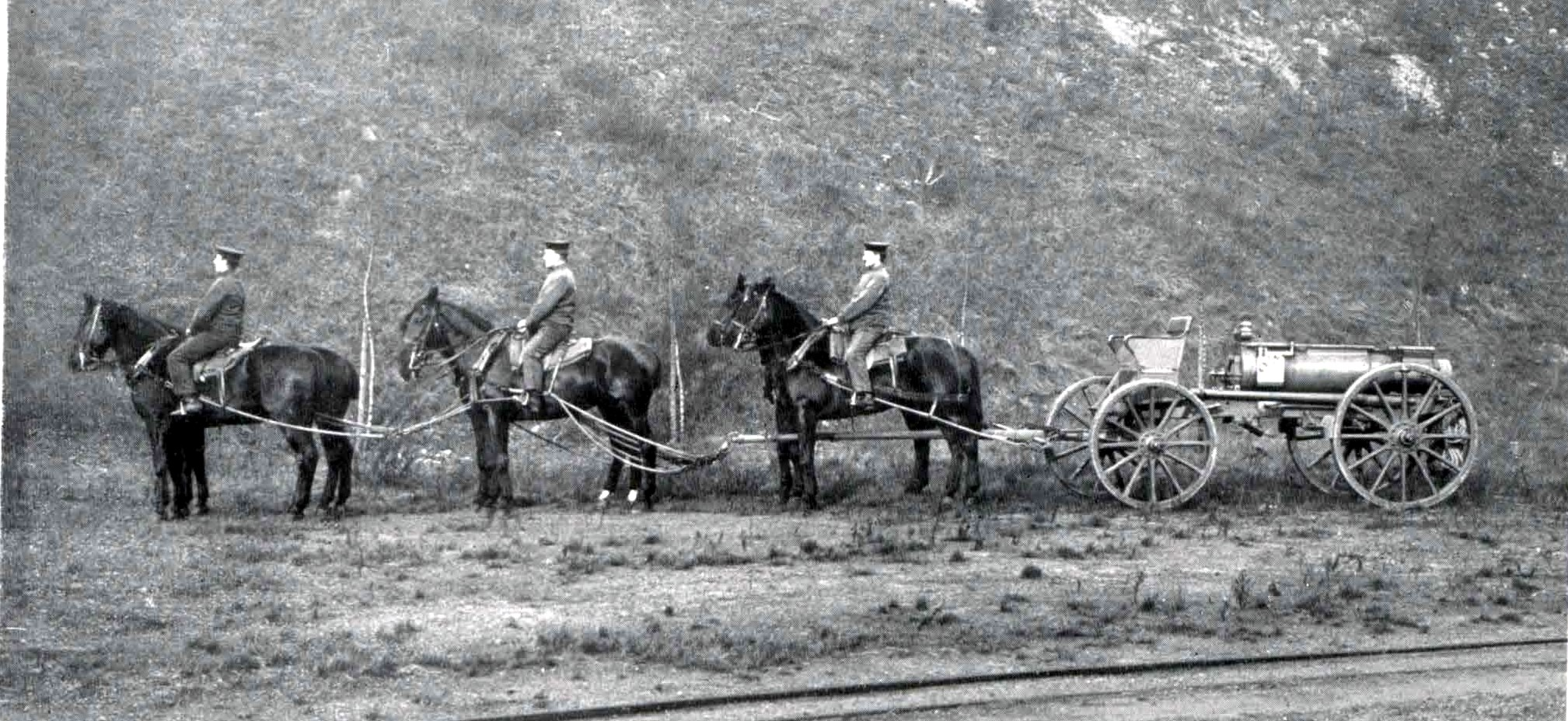
A 21 cm Mörser barrel being transported.

== See also ==
- Isis District War Memorial in Childers, Queensland, Australia, where a surviving 21 cm Mörser 10 engraved with "Nr 406 - Fried Krupp AG, Essen - 1916" is now located, having been captured by the Australian Army in Flanders.

=== Weapons of comparable role, performance and era ===
- BL 8 inch Howitzer Mk I – V British equivalent firing slightly lighter shell
