= Isis District War Memorial and Shire Council Chambers =

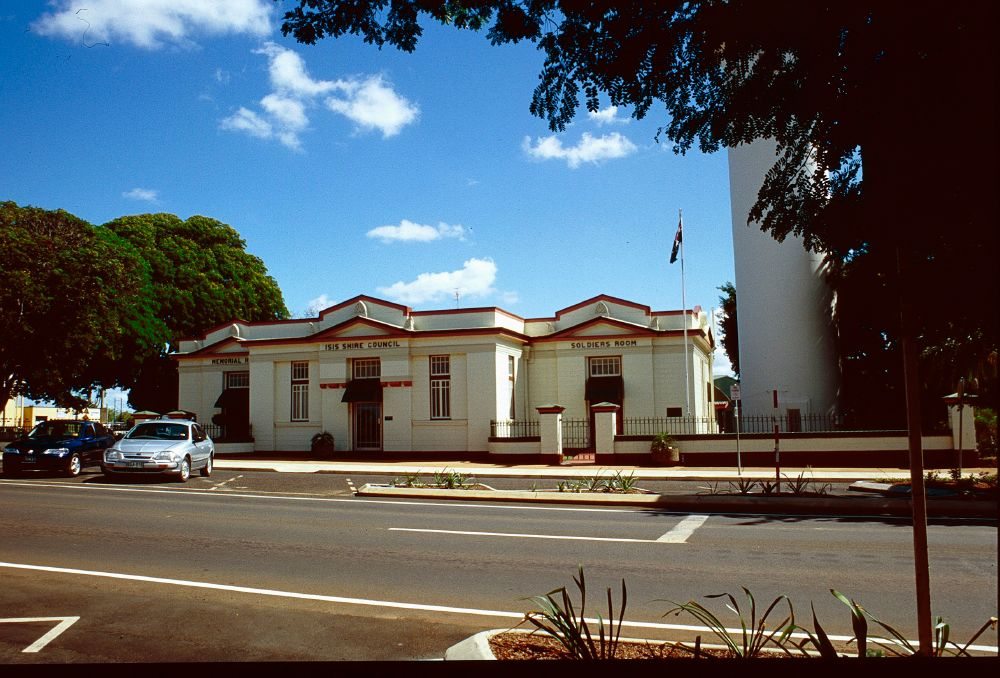
- Isis District War Memorial and Shire Council Chambers, 2000

- Location within Queensland
- 25.2355°S 152.2807°E
- Location: 45 Churchill Street, Childers, Bundaberg Region, Queensland, Australia

History
- Design period: 1919–1930s (interwar period)
- Built: 1925–1926

Site notes
- Architect: Francis Jones

Queensland Heritage Register
- Official name: Isis District War Memorial and Shire Council Chambers
- Type: state heritage (built)
- Designated: 26 May 2000
- Reference no.: 601507
- Significant period: 1920s (fabric)
- Significant components: memorial – chamber/room, office/s, toilet block/earth closet/water closet, memorial – honour board/ roll of honour, cannon, memorial – plaque, gate – entrance, fence/wall – perimeter, strong room, furniture/fittings
- Builders: Reuben Vacher Brady

Isis District War Memorial and Shire Council Chambers is a heritage-listed memorial hall and former shire council chambers at 45 Churchill Street, Childers, Bundaberg Region, Queensland, Australia. It was designed by Francis Jones and built from 1925 to 1926 by Reuben Vacher Brady. It was unveiled 15 October 1926. It was added to the Queensland Heritage Register on 26 May 2000.

== History ==
The Isis District War Memorial and Shire Council Chambers was constructed in 1926 and is the second administration building for the Isis Shire Council in the town of Childers. In the 1870s timber cutters were the first European settlers to come to the area surrounding Childers, attracted by large quantities of hoop pine, red cedar and other timbers. The town was established during the 1880s after the land in the nearby area was surveyed into 50-acre (20 ha) farm blocks in 1882. There was no official town survey and Childers developed following the private subdivision of portions 870 and 871, at the railhead of the 1887 Isis railway line from Isis Junction.

Childers and other towns in the present Isis Shire were originally part of the Burrum Divisional Board which was based in Maryborough. There was considerable discontent during the 1880s amongst the ratepayers of the fledgling town who felt disadvantaged and neglected. The Burrum Divisional Board covered a very extensive area and the 36-mile (58 km) journey to Maryborough coupled with the poor condition of the roads meant that representatives from the Isis district often failed to attend meetings. The Isis ratepayers and Isis Progress Association presented a petition for separation to the then Governor-in-Chief, Sir Anthony Musgrave and the members of the Executive Council of Queensland. They requested that Sub-division 3 be severed from the Burrum Division and be constituted as a separate division, the Isis Division.

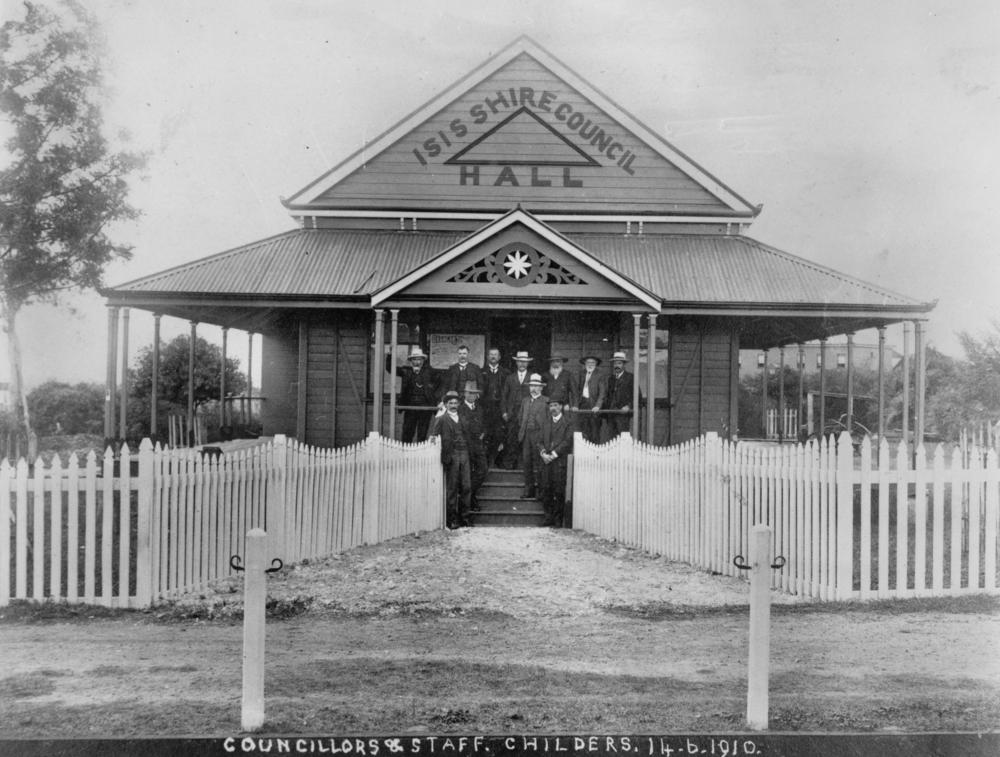
Town Councillors on the steps of the Isis Shire Hall, Childers, 1910

The Governor and Executive Council agreed to the petitioners' request and on 31 December 1886 the Isis Divisional Board was proclaimed. Meetings and elections were held in Howard at the Court House and board members from Childers rode on horseback to attend meetings once a month. The location of the Board's office was an issue of contention for a number of years and various propositions were presented for re-locating to Childers, Isistown or to a new building in Howard. In 1891, an offer of land in Childers was made to the Board and they subsequently made an application to the government for a loan of £250 to erect a new building. From 1891, the Isis Divisional Board met in the Land's Office, two rooms adjoining the Post and Telegraph Office in Childers. In 1903, the Isis Divisional Board was abolished by the Governor-in-Council and the Isis Shire Council was created. That same year, the Council moved to the Isis Shire Council Hall, a low-set timber building which had been constructed in Churchill Street on the site of the present swimming pool.

World War I had a profound impact on the small town. Large numbers of young men from the district enlisted and the town experienced a loss of 60 from a population of 1500. A deputation of men and women from the Isis District War Memorial Committee approached the Isis Shire Council at its General Meeting on 20 October 1924 to discuss the possibility of jointly constructing the "Isis District War Memorial Shire Council Chambers". The proposed building would house a Soldiers' Memorial and a room for returned soldiers as well as new Council Chambers. A joint committee was formed. A driving force behind the war memorial project was the then Shire Clerk, Mr Herbert Epps. Epps was a former councillor who had relinquished his position on Council to take up the job of Shire Clerk, a responsibility he maintained until his death in 1932. One of his three sons was killed in action in France in 1917 and he was passionate in his determination to have the War Memorial Council Chambers erected.

Epps strongly desire that Childer's contribution to the war effort should be reflected in the allocation of a significant war trophy to form part of the memorial. As early as 2 December 1918, he wrote to Edward Corser, the Member of the Australian House of Representatives for the local electorate of Wide Bay asking for two field guns to adorn the memorial. However, the initial response was that Childers was not a large enough town to warrant a large war trophy. The Isis Shire Council responded that "some 360 men enlisted from Childers, with 85 not returning from the war" as evidence of the district's commitment and sacrifice; this resulted in a decision that they would receive a smaller machine gun. However, the council continued to press its case arguing that "To suggest that a machine gun adequately expresses that part this district has played in the Great War ... is so absurd as to only arise from a want of appreciation as to the fact and to the importance of this as the centre". The council continued to argue their case for a field gun until on 29 April 1922 they were to be given a 210-millimetre (8.3 in) Howitzer field gun (in addition to the machine gun and 75-millimetre (3.0 in) trench mortar that they had previously been allocated).

The Joint Committee had decided to invite competitive designs for the building and received entries in early February 1925. The submissions were judged without knowledge of the authors and "design number two" was chosen. The winner was Brisbane architect Francis Jones. Jones had undertaken his architectural education in England and was the first Queensland-born architect to achieve the distinction of being admitted as an Associate of the Royal Institute of British Architects. He was an architect for both Queensland Railways and the Department of Public Works and lectured at the Brisbane Central Technical College and the University of Queensland. Jones was also a returned soldier having fought in both the Boer War and World War I. He received £26/5/- as prize money for his winning entry of a masonry building in the shape of a cross in plan, that was uncluttered and formal in appearance.

Tenders were considered at a special meeting of Council in August 1925 and Mr R.V Brady's tender of £3449/19/-, which included furnishings, was accepted. The Council borrowed £2000 from the AMP Society to pay for their share of the construction costs. The building is said to have been constructed of hand-formed blocks and it is believed that Thomas Pye was the architect who supervised the construction, however, the nature of the relationship between Pye and Jones' design is not clear. Pye was in private practice at this time having left the Department of Public Works. Pye had experienced a tumultuous working life in the Department despite his significant contribution to the design of many of Queensland's most important public buildings. Pye was a keen rifleman and also served with the army, rising to the rank of colonel, and it may have been through these connections that Pye became involved with the Isis project.

Construction was completed and the building opened on Anzac Day (25 April), 1926. The official opening and dedication of the Isis War Memorial was a significant event in the life of the Childers community. The Maryborough Chronicle reported that "the memorial was planned, supervised and built by returned soldiers and it is understood it is the first of its kind in the Commonwealth." The ceremony included an Anzac Day service, conducted by local priests, one of whom was also a returned soldier. The opening ceremony was performed by William Brand, who represented Burrum in the Queensland Legislative Assembly, the memorial was opened by Miss Adie, daughter of long-term Isis councillor and chairman of the Directors of the Isis Central Sugar Mill Company, Alex Adie and the soldier's room was opened by Mrs H Epps, wife of the Shire Clerk and mother of James Epps who features in the memorial. The Childers Town Band provided extensive musical accompaniment and the Union Jack was unfurled at the top of the building.

A visitor to the memorial in 1927 provides an evocative description in The Queensland Digger, capturing the powerful emotional impact of the War Memorial room:

"Many and varied are the types of memorial to be seen throughout this vast land of ours... but of the many which I have seen I was never more impressed than with the abovenamed memorial, which is situated in the little township of Childers; one of Queensland's sugar producing districts.

...in keeping with the sacrifice of which it reminds us, it takes the form of a Maltese Cross (sic.), which is decidedly emblematical... The centre of the building is occupied by the Local Authorities and takes the form of offices, strong room and board meeting room. The right portion is a recreation room for the use of returned soldiers, while the left hand side of the building presents a picture which I shall never forget; for this is the sanctuary where relatives of the fallen temporarily shut themselves in with the memory of their dear ones. The beautiful honour board extends nearly around the four walls. Mounted upon this board are many individual bronzed metal frames appropriate in design and where it has been possible to secure same, the photograph of the dead soldier appears. The effect is splendid and to complete the unique work a shelf has been arranged so that there is ample room for the relatives to place flowers in remembrance. What impressed me mostly was the fact that a number of the vases contained fresh flowers: showing that someone had gratefully made use of the facilities provided by this wonderful memorial."

The Shire of Isis ceased to exist in 2008, when it merged into the new Bundaberg Region, and as such the building was no longer needed as council chambers. However, the building has been retained by the successor council as its Childers Service Centre.

Isis District War Memorial and Shire Council Chambers was listed on the Queensland Heritage Register on 26 May 2000.

== Description ==
The Isis District War Memorial and Council Chambers is a one-story masonry building located at the southern end of Churchill Street, Childers. The town's water tower provides a backdrop to the building which is set amid wide lawns with several large shade trees. The building is centrally planned, taking the form of a Greek cross in plan and exhibiting a style most aptly described as abstract Classicism. This is emphasised in elevation by the use of elements such as pediments, acroteria and an austere, modulated facade that suggests an abstracted temple front.

The building sits low to the ground on a concrete slab and is constructed of painted, load-bearing concrete blocks with the appearance of vermiculated ashlar. A low masonry wall and cast-iron fence runs along the front boundary of the site, attaching to the corners of the front elevation. Two sets of gates defined by pairs of masonry piers lead to the entrances of the War Memorial and Soldier's Room. Each wall of the building has a centrally located, moulded pediment whose shape is reflected in a parapet wall above. Acroteria are located at the apex and ends of the pediments. Moulded string courses separate the pediments from the walls and sections of the lower facade are recessed around window openings. These recessed sections are further divided by an enlarged concrete sill that stretch the full width of the recess. Windows and doors are generally timber framed surmounted by large, painted iron hoods.

The central section of the building accommodates the Shire Council offices which are accessed via a recent, steel and glass entry door. A hallway runs the length of the building from the front entrance to an exit door at the back. An entry vestibule has been formed from a section of the hallway partitioned with a plasterboard wall and recent timber and glass door. To the right of the vestibule is a large open plan office with a long service counter and small waiting area. Other Council offices and a strong room are located either side of the hallway. All of these rooms have recent suspended ceilings which have been inserted to conceal air conditioning ducts. Many of the internal walls are painted, load-bearing masonry with timber skirting boards with other recent plasterboard partitions dividing some of the offices into two smaller offices. A second service counter area is located in the rear section of the hallway on the left-hand side, this is now unused.

The western wing of the building accommodates the War Memorial room and the eastern wing, formerly the Soldier's Room, now contains the Council meeting room, staff room and photocopy room. The Council meeting room has a recent plasterboard ceiling with recessed down-lighting, a dark brown upholstered dado and a large, horseshoe-shaped meeting table that was purpose built for the space. The tall, panelled, timber entrance doors in the southern wall are no longer used and a small exit door is situated on the eastern wall. On the exterior of the western and eastern wings, a bay of three windows consisting of a central pair flanked by single windows with fanlights above, is arranged directly below the pediment.

The War Memorial is entered via a gently sloping ramp and through a pair of tall, timber panelled doors. Dark timber honour boards stretch across all four walls of the room. There are two boards on the eastern wall, the upper one is in memory of the men who died in action in World War Two and is surmounted by an ornate timber pediment. The lower boards are in memory of the men who died in World War One. The boards are inscribed with gilt lettering and have a row of copper plaques mounted upon them. Alongside the names of battlefields, is a quote from Wilfred Owen's deeply ironic poem "Dulce Et Decorum Est" – "how wonderful it is to die for the fatherland". Each plaque is dedicated to the memory of an individual soldier and is embossed with the years of the war, the badge of the Australian Imperial Force and an oval-shaped photograph of the soldier framed by a pair of weeping women and the words "in memory of". The soldiers' names are engraved on small plaques below. The plaques for the First World War are brass and for the Second, chrome. A timber shelf runs below the copper plaques and a small vase with artificial red poppies is placed in front of each plaque. Above one of the plaques is a framed black and white photo of the foreign grave of the soldier to whom the plaque is dedicated.

Flags are mounted on the walls above the honour boards and chairs are located in each corner of the room. Wreaths, framed photographs of the reigning monarch and a visitor's book are to be found on a table in the centre of the room. The room is carpeted, the windows are shaded with venetian blinds and the plaster ceiling is decorated with a grid-like pattern.

Toilets are located in a small separate building at the back, north-eastern corner of the building. The toilet block is constructed of face brick with a skillion roof. Also situated at the back of the building are two areas of air conditioning plant enclosed by timber paling fences.

A German 21-centimetre (8.3 in) 21 cm Mörser 10 cannon is located on the western side of the building. It was manufactured in Essen, Germany in 1916 by Fried Krupp. It was captured by the Australian Army in Flanders and was presented by the French Government to the Australian Government, which allocated it to Childers. It has the marking "Nr 406 - Fried Krupp AG, Essen - 1916".
