= The Mud Soldier =

2017 mud sculpture installed in Trafalgar Square, London

Coordinates: 51°30′30.22″N 0°7′43.66″W

The Mud Soldier on display in London

The Mud Soldier was an artwork by Damian and Killian Van Der Velden (Grofweg Architecten) displayed in Trafalgar Square. It was commissioned to commemorate the 100th anniversary of the Battle of Passchendaele.

The sculpture, depicting a First World War soldier seated on a bedroll, was constructed from sand and mud taken from Flanders Fields. Situated in the open air, it was intended to disintegrate over the five days that it was on show. The location was chosen due to the proximity of the homes of two servicemen who had received the Victoria Cross for their actions at Passchendaele.
