= 21 cm Mörser 16 =

German heavy howitzer

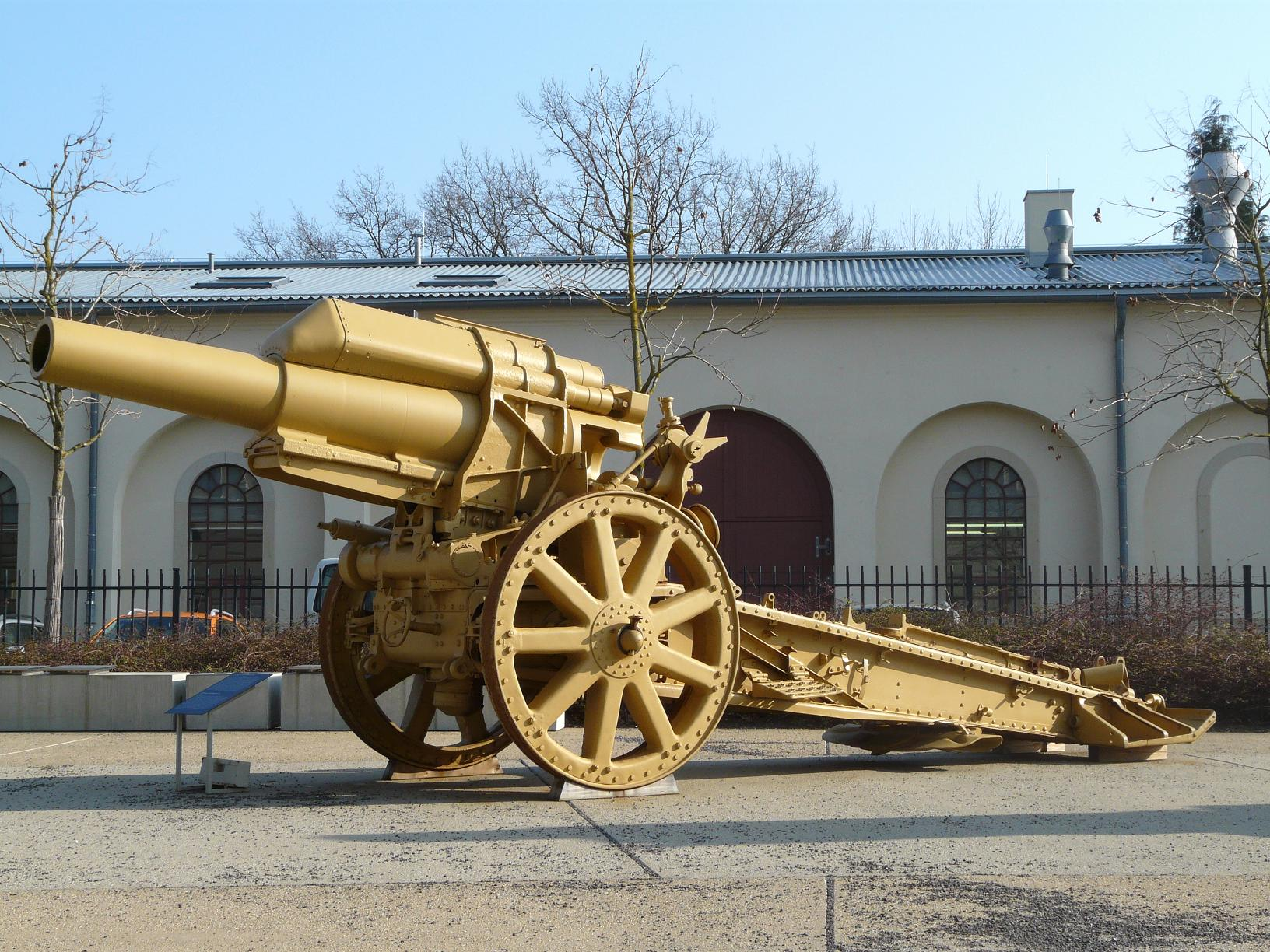
- 21 cm Mörser 16 in Dresden Bundeswehr Military History Museum.
- Type: Howitzer
- Place of origin: German Empire

Service history
- In service: 1916–50
- Used by: German Empire; Sweden; Nazi Germany; Finland
- Wars: World War I, World War II

Production history
- Designer: Krupp
- Designed: 1915
- Manufacturer: Krupp
- Produced: 1916–1918
- No. built: 736 examples

Specifications
- Mass: 6,680 kg (14,730 lb)
- Barrel length: 2.67 m (8 ft 9 in) L/14.5
- Shell: separate-loading, cased charge
- Caliber: 211 mm (8.3 in)
- Breech: horizontal sliding-wedge
- Recoil: Hydro-pneumatic
- Carriage: Box trail
- Elevation: -6° to +70°
- Traverse: 4°
- Rate of fire: 1–2 rpm
- Muzzle velocity: 393 m/s (1,290 ft/s)
- Maximum firing range: 11,100 m (12,100 yd)
- Filling: TNT

The 21 cm Mörser 16 (21 cm Mrs 16), or 21 cm Lange Mörser M 16/L14.5, was a heavy howitzer used by Germany in World War I and World War II (although classified as a mortar (Mörser) by the German military).

== History ==
It was based on the earlier 21 cm Mörser 10 but had a longer barrel, a gun shield and other refinements. Originally, it broke down into two loads for transport but the Germans rebuilt surviving guns during the 1930s with rubber-rimmed steel wheels to allow for motor traction in one piece with a limber under the trail and generally removed the gun shield.

== Combat service ==
In German service, it used two shells, the 21 cm Gr 18 (HE) that weighed 113 kg (249 lb) and the 21 cm Gr 18 Be concrete-piercing shell of 121.4 kg (268 lb) with a filler of 11.61 kg (25.6 lb) of TNT.

They remained in first-line use with the Germans until replaced by the 21 cm Mörser 18 by about 1940. Afterwards, they were used for training, although some equipped units in secondary theaters.

In 1918, Sweden bought a dozen weapons from the Germans; these remained in service until 1950. Finland bought four of these from Sweden during the Winter War, although they did not participate in the war because the Finns lacked vehicles strong enough to tow their great weight to the front. This had been rectified before the Continuation War and the Finns equipped the 10th Separate Super-Heavy Artillery Battery with them for the duration of the war. The Swedes had their own concrete-piercing shells, called 210 tkrv 51/65-ps R-/33 by the Finnish army, weighing 120.75 kg (266.2 lb), which had dispersion problems as the Finns found out. The weapons were put into reserve after the war and remained there until the late 1960s before being discarded.

== Gallery ==
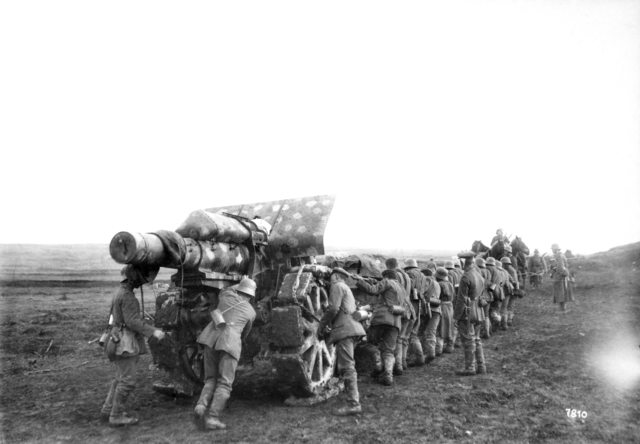
Moving into action, Ham, March 1918.

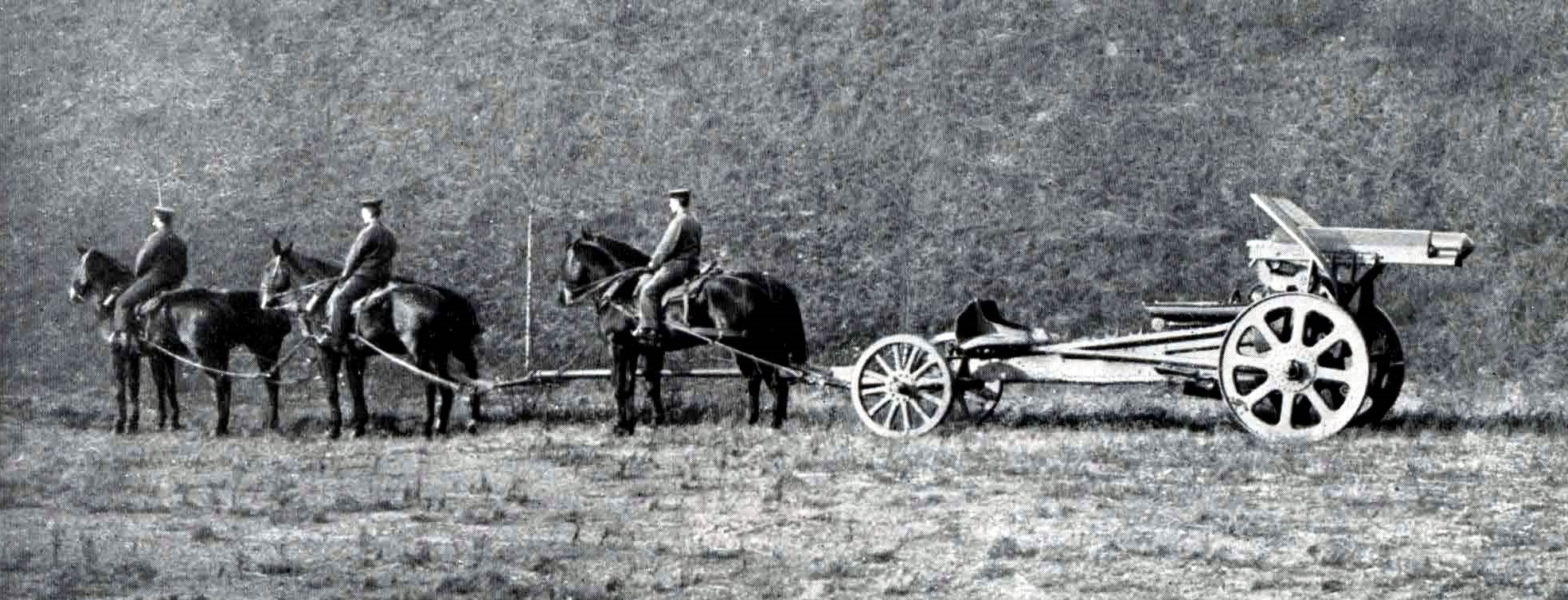
A 21 cm Mörser carriage being transported.

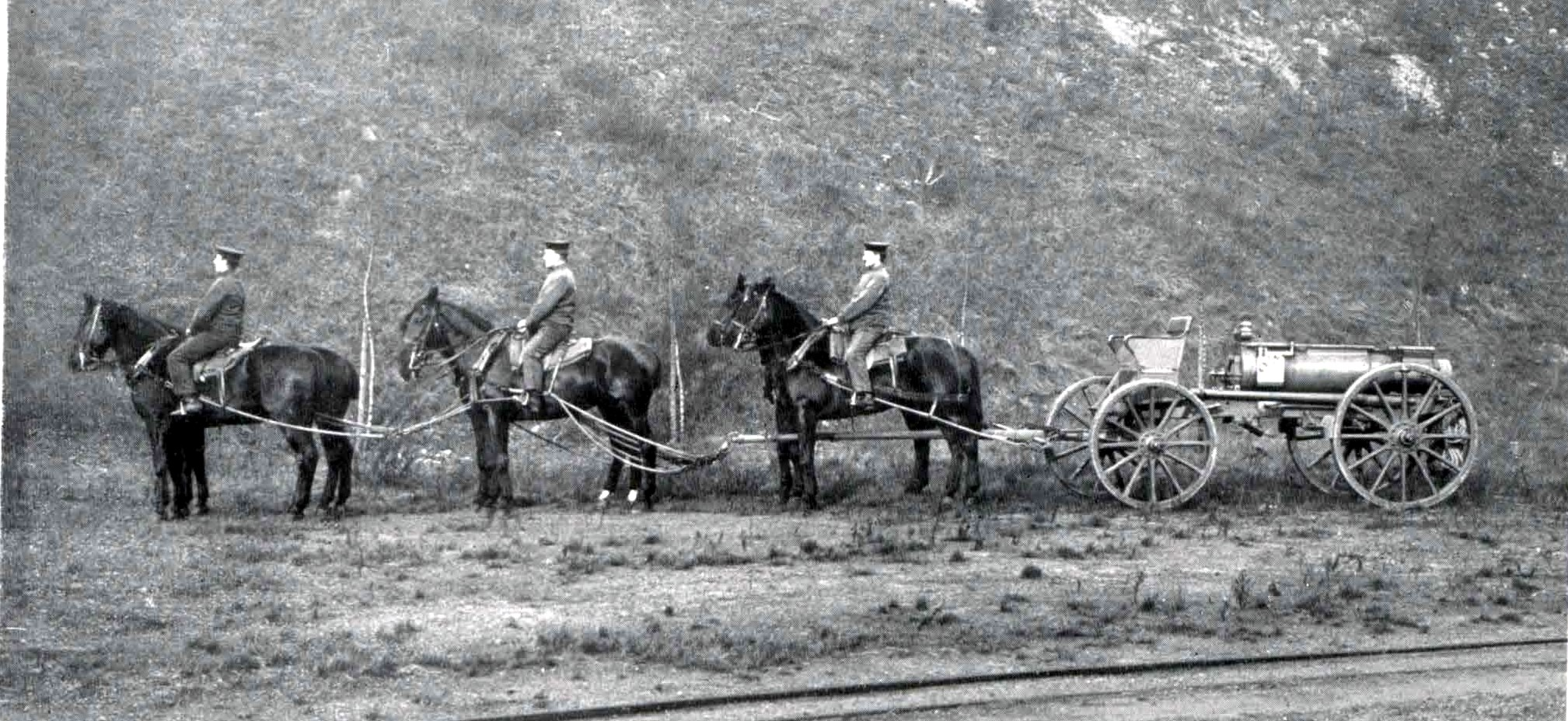
A 21 cm Mörser barrel being transported.

== See also ==
=== Weapons of comparable role, performance and era ===
- 220 mm TR mle 1915/1916 – French equivalent
- BL 8-inch howitzer Mk VI – VIII – British equivalent firing slightly lighter shell
