= Moina Michael =

American academic (1869–1944)

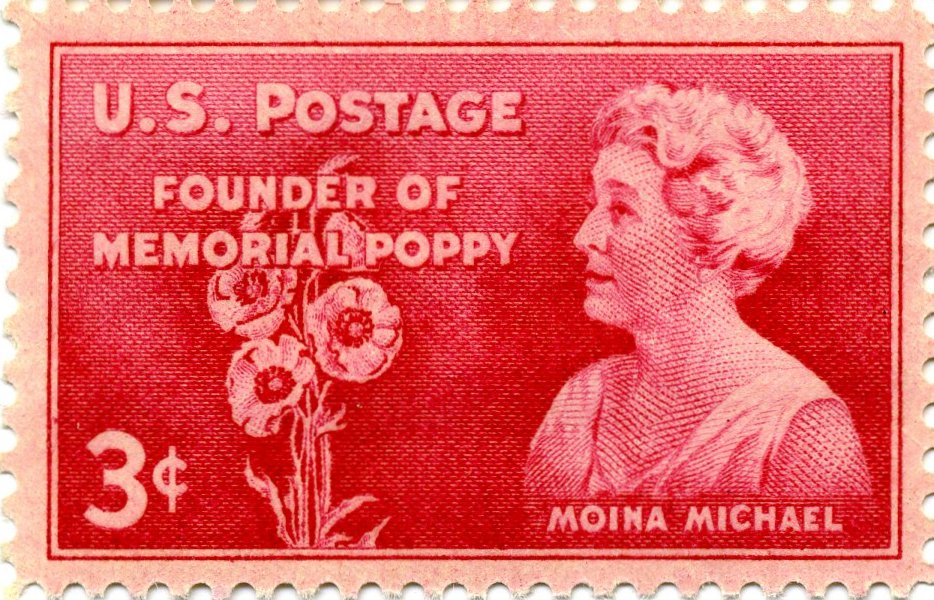
Moina Michael on a 1948 U.S. commemorative stamp

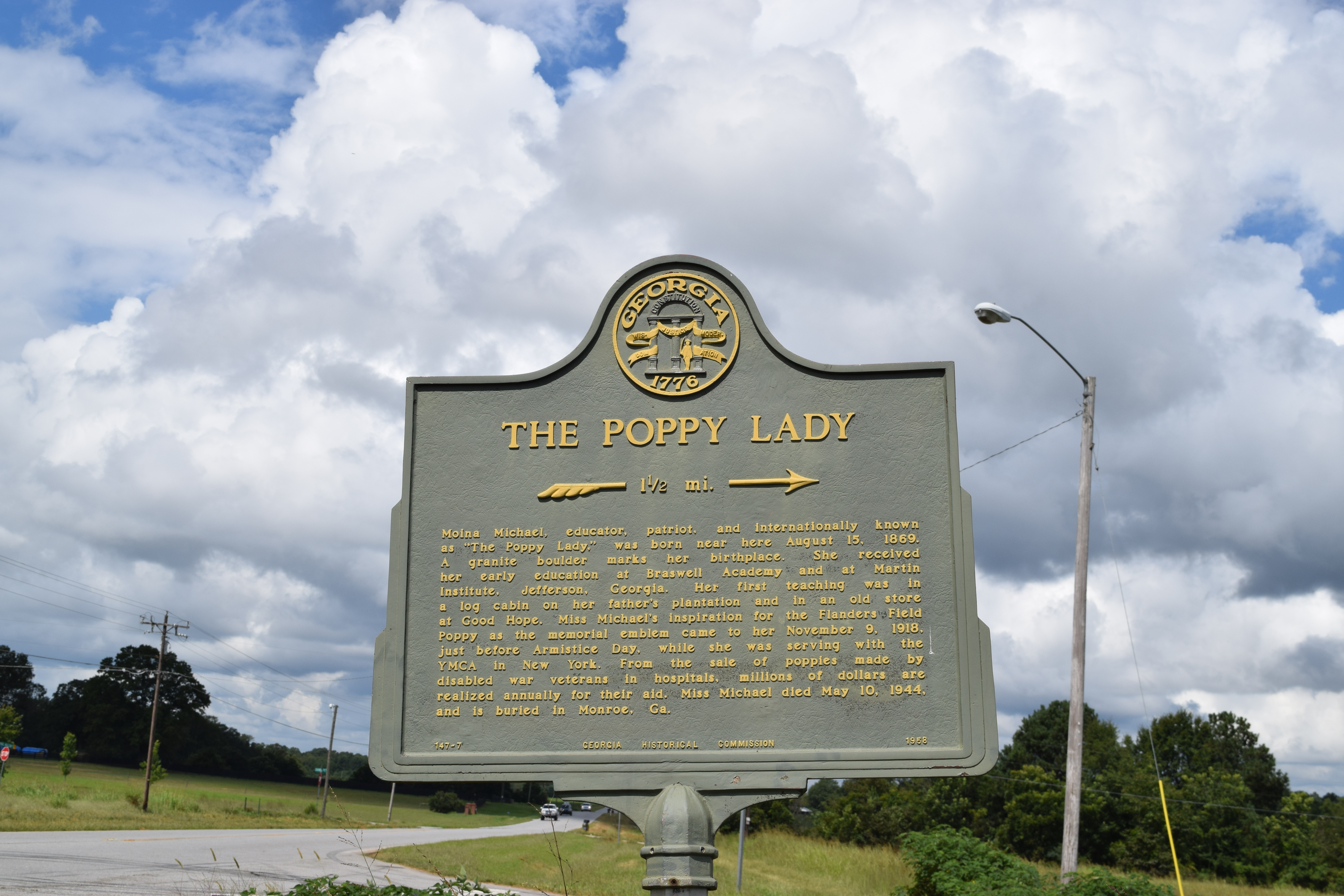
The Poppy Lady Georgia Historical Marker

Moina Belle Michael (August 15, 1869 – May 10, 1944) was an American professor and humanitarian who conceived the idea of using poppies as a symbol of remembrance for those who served in World War I.

== Early life ==
Michael was born in 1869 and lived on what is now known as 3698 Moina Michael Road in Good Hope, in Walton County, Georgia. She was the eldest daughter and second of the seven children of John Marion Michael, a Confederate veteran of the American Civil War, and Alice Sherwood Wise. She was distantly related to General Francis Marion on her father's side, and the Wise family of Virginia state governors on her mother's side. Both sides of her family had Huguenot ancestry, with origins in Brittany and Flanders respectively. Her family was wealthy and owned a cotton plantation until 1898. She was educated at Braswell Academy in Morgan County, and the Martin Institute in Jefferson, Georgia.

She became a teacher in 1885, initially in Good Hope and then in Monroe, Georgia. She taught at the Lucy Cobb Institute and State Normal School, both located in Athens, Georgia. She studied at Columbia University in New York City in 1912–13.

== First World War ==
Michael visited Europe in June and July 1914. She was in Germany when the First World War broke out in August 1914, and travelled to Rome to return home to the US. In Rome, she assisted around 12,000 US tourists to seek passage back across the Atlantic. She returned to the US on the RMS Carpathia and returned to teaching at Normal School in Athens, Georgia.

She was a professor at the University of Georgia when the U.S. entered World War I in April 1917. She took a leave of absence from her work and volunteered to assist in the New York-based training headquarters for overseas YWCA workers.

== Remembrance poppy ==
On November 9, 1918, inspired by the Canadian John McCrae battlefront-theme poem "In Flanders Fields", she wrote a poem in response called "We Shall Keep the Faith". In tribute to the opening lines of McCrae's poem – "In Flanders fields the poppies blow / Between the crosses row on row," – Michael vowed to always wear a red poppy as a symbol of remembrance for those who served in the war.

After the war was over, Michael returned to the University of Georgia and taught a class of disabled servicemen. Realizing the need to provide financial and occupational support for these servicemen, she pursued the idea of selling silk poppies as a means of raising funds to assist disabled veterans. In 1921, her efforts resulted in the poppy being adopted as a symbol of remembrance for war veterans by the American Legion Auxiliary, and by Earl Haig's British Legion Appeal Fund (later the Royal British Legion) later that year.

== Later life and legacy ==
Known as the "Poppy Lady" for her humanitarian efforts, Michael received numerous awards during her lifetime. She retired from the University of Georgia in 1934, and published an autobiography in 1941, The Miracle Flower: The Story of the Flanders Fields Memorial Poppy.

In 1944, a Liberty ship constructed in Georgia was named SS Moina Michael in her honor. In 1948, four years after her death, the U.S. Postal Service issued a commemorative 3-cent stamp honoring her life's achievement. In 1969, the Georgia General Assembly named a section of U.S. Highway 78 the Moina Michael Highway. In 1999 she was named to the Georgia Women of Achievement Hall of Fame. She was a member of the Daughters of the American Revolution and the United Daughters of the Confederacy. A statue of Moina Michael is located in front of the courthouse in Monroe, Georgia. Moina Michael is buried in Rest Haven Cemetery, 200 North Madison Avenue in Monroe, GA.

== See also ==
- Lillian Bilsky Freiman
