= We Shall Keep the Faith =

1918 poem by Moina Michael

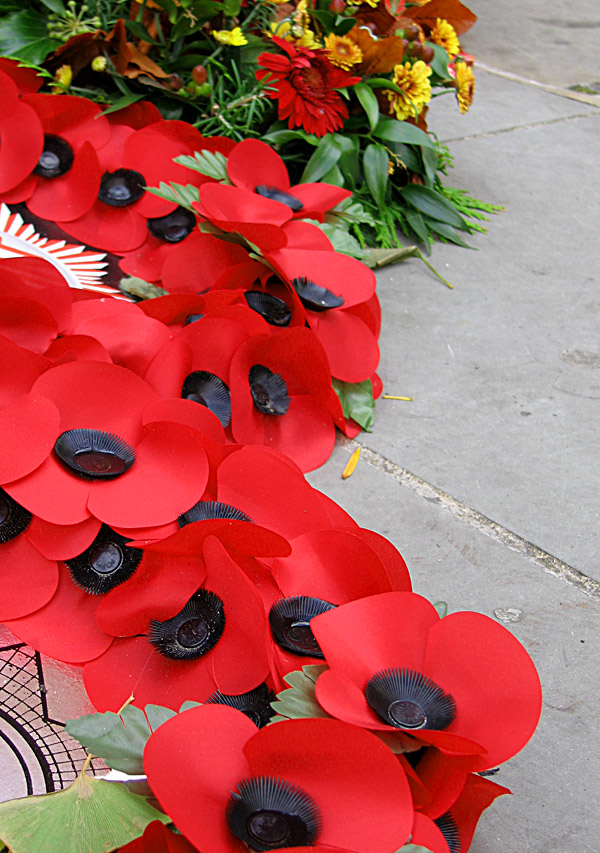
Wreaths of artificial poppies used as a symbol of remembrance

"We Shall Keep the Faith" is a poem penned by Moina Michael in November 1918. She received inspiration for this poem from "In Flanders Fields". The "poppy red" refers to Papaver rhoeas.

Oh! you who sleep in Flanders Fields,
Sleep sweet – to rise anew!
We caught the torch you threw
And holding high, we keep the Faith
With All who died.

We cherish, too, the Poppy red
That grows on fields where valor led;
It seems to signal to the skies
That blood of heroes never dies,
But lends a lustre to the red
Of the flower that blooms above the dead
In Flanders Fields.

And now the Torch and Poppy Red
We wear in honor of our dead.
Fear not that ye have died for naught;
We'll teach the lesson that ye wrought
In Flanders Fields.
