= 21 cm Mörser 99 =

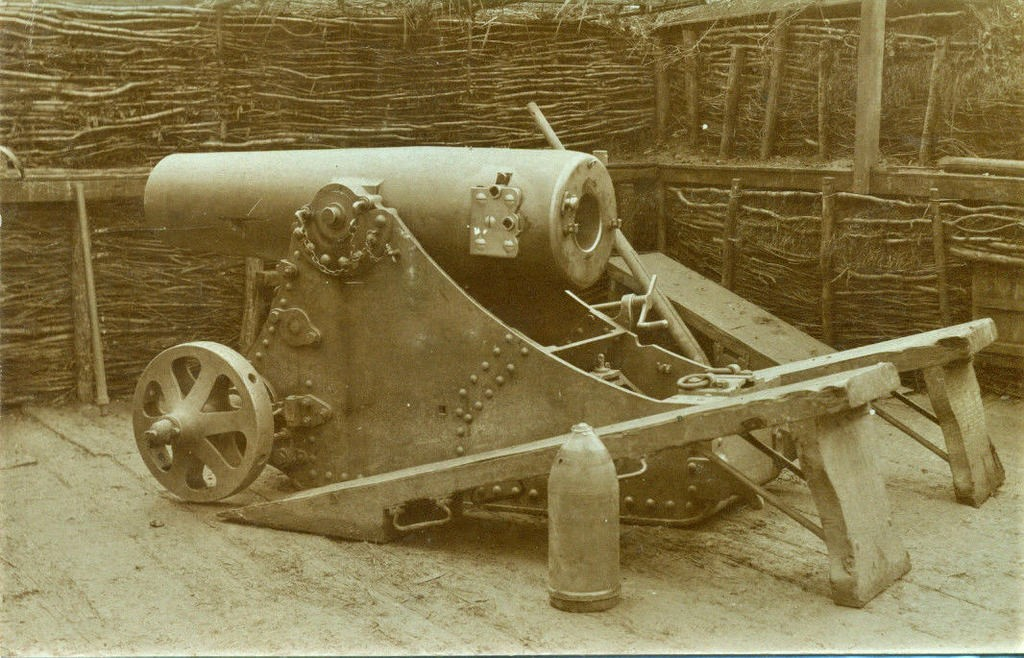
- Type: Siege mortar
- Place of origin: German Empire

Service history
- In service: 1899−1918
- Used by: German Empire
- Wars: World War I

Production history
- Designer: Krupp
- Designed: 1893
- Manufacturer: Krupp
- Produced: 1899

Specifications
- Mass: Travel: 6,380 kg (14,070 lb); Combat: 4,820 kg (10,630 lb)
- Barrel length: 2.1 m (6 ft 11 in) L/10
- Shell: Separate-loading, bagged charges and projectiles
- Shell weight: 83–144 kg (183–317 lb)
- Caliber: 211 mm (8.3 in)
- Breech: Horizontal sliding-block
- Recoil: None
- Carriage: Garrison mount
- Elevation: +6° to +70°
- Traverse: 4°
- Rate of fire: 1 round every 3 minutes
- Muzzle velocity: 300–394 m/s (980–1,290 ft/s)
- Maximum firing range: 6.8–8.3 km (4.2–5.2 mi)

The 21 cm Mörser 99 (Abbr. 21 cm Mrs 99) was a German siege mortar built by Krupp that served during World War I. The mortar utilized a new nickel-steel alloy of greater strength than other cast cannons, though it lacked a recoil mechanism. While the gun was more effective than previous models, it was soon phased out because of improved field artillery and counter-battery fire, though it remained in service in limited numbers throughout the war because of heavy German losses.

== History ==
=== Background ===
The majority of military planners before the First World War were wedded to the concept of fighting an offensive war of rapid maneuver, which in a time before mechanization meant a focus on cavalry and light horse artillery firing shrapnel shells. Although the majority of combatants had heavy field artillery prior to the outbreak of the First World War, none had adequate numbers of heavy guns in service, nor had they foreseen the growing importance of heavy artillery once the Western Front stagnated and trench warfare set in.

The theorists hadn't foreseen that trenches, barbed wire, and machine guns would rob them of the mobility they had been counting on, and like in the Franco-Prussian and Russo-Turkish wars the need for high-angle heavy artillery to deal with fortifications reasserted itself. Since aircraft of the period were not yet capable of carrying large diameter bombs, the burden of delivering heavy firepower fell on the artillery. The combatants scrambled to find anything that could fire a heavy shell, meant emptying fortresses and scouring depots for guns held in reserve. It also meant converting coastal artillery and naval guns to siege guns by either giving them simple field carriages or mounting the larger pieces on rail carriages.

=== Service ===
The Mrs 99 was designed in 1893 and built by Krupp in 1899. The Mrs 99 was a successor to earlier 21 cm mortars that had been in service since the Franco-Prussian War. The Mrs 99 was fairly conventional for its time and most nations had similar mortars such as the Mortier de 220 mm modèle 1880 or Mortaio da 210/8 D.S. However, its lack of recoil mechanism made it dated, and by the time the First World War broke out it had been largely made obsolete by the 21 cm Mörser 10.

In 1914, it was estimated that 48 were in service with reserve units. However, it was brought back into service due to a combination of higher than expected losses and insufficient numbers of heavy guns which led to them being issued as replacements to heavy field artillery battalions. Each battery consisted of four guns with four batteries per battalion.

== Design ==
The Mrs 99 was a short barreled breech-loading mortar on a rigid garrison mount consisting of a U-shaped gun cradle, which held the trunnioned barrel. Like many of its contemporaries, its carriage did not have a recoil mechanism. The barrel was a typical built-up gun of the period with all steel construction. The gun had an early form of horizontal sliding-block breech and it fired separate-loading bagged charges and projectiles. The Mrs 99 could fire a variety of different projectiles, which the later Mörser 10 also used. The advantage the Mrs 99 had over its predecessors was that it was made from nickel-steel of much greater strength than previous guns made of cast bronze or cast iron. This meant that the Mrs 99 could be smaller in diameter, lighter in weight, fire heavier projectiles, and have longer range. However, field artillery also improved during that time and the threat of counter-battery fire led to the Mrs 99 being phased out soon after its introduction.

For transport, the Mrs 99 could be broken down into two separate wagon loads for the barrel and gun cradle. At the front of the gun cradle, a two-wheeled wooden spoked axle was attached and the rear of the cradle was then hooked up to a limber so the mortar could be towed by a horse team or artillery tractor. The barrel was towed on its own four-wheeled wagon with an integral hoist to mount/demount the barrel. Once on site, the axle was removed and a set of small wheels could be fitted to the front of the gun cradle. A piece of ground was then leveled, a wooden firing platform was assembled, and the mortar was placed on the firing platform. The mortar could then be connected to an external recoil mechanism, which connected to a steel eye on the firing platform and a hook on the carriage between the wheels. Two wooden ramps were then placed behind the wheels and when the mortar fired the wheels rolled up the ramp and were returned to position by gravity. There was also no traversing mechanism and the gun had to be levered into position to aim. A drawback of this system was the gun had to be re-aimed each time which lowered the rate of fire.

== Photo Gallery ==
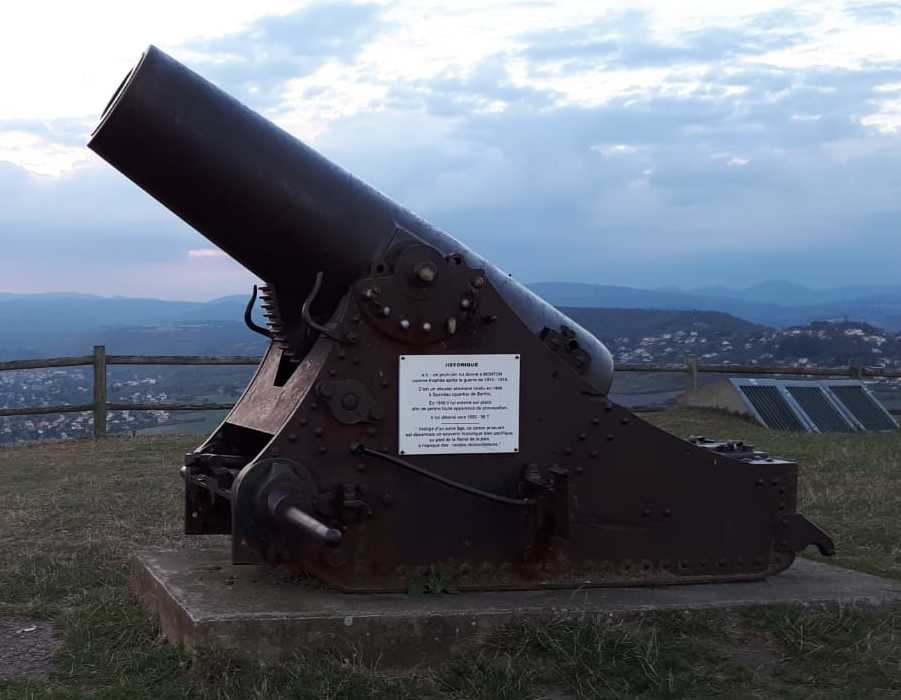
A Mrs 99 at Mt. Monton France.

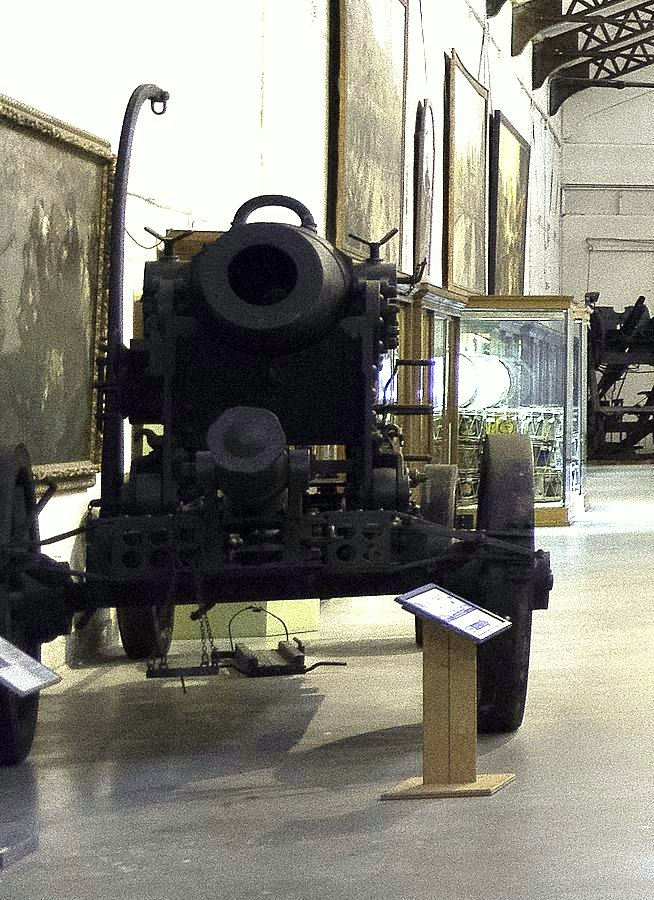
A Mrs 99 on its field carriage at the Royal Military Museum, Brussels.

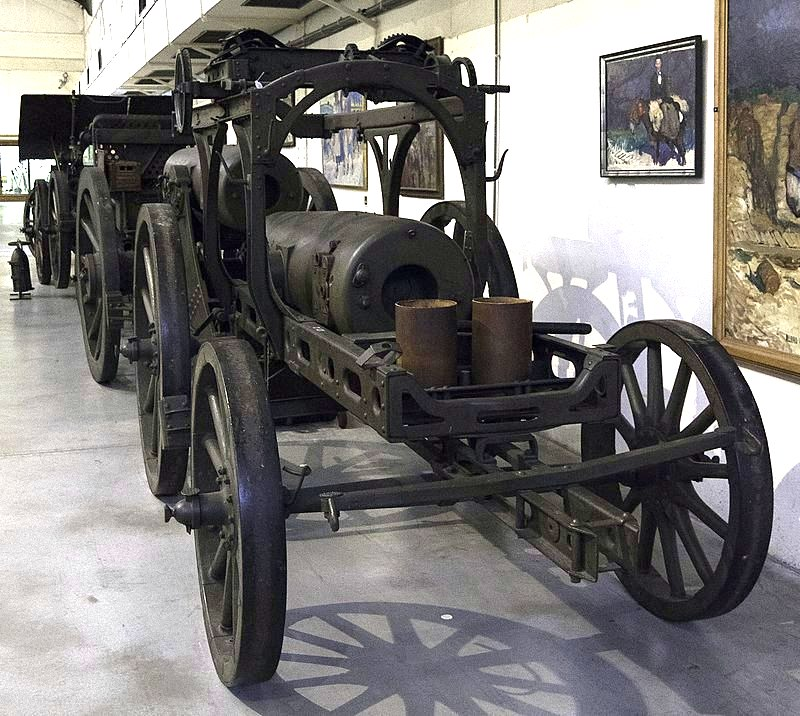
A Mrs 99 barrel on its transport wagon at the Royal Military Museum, Brussels.

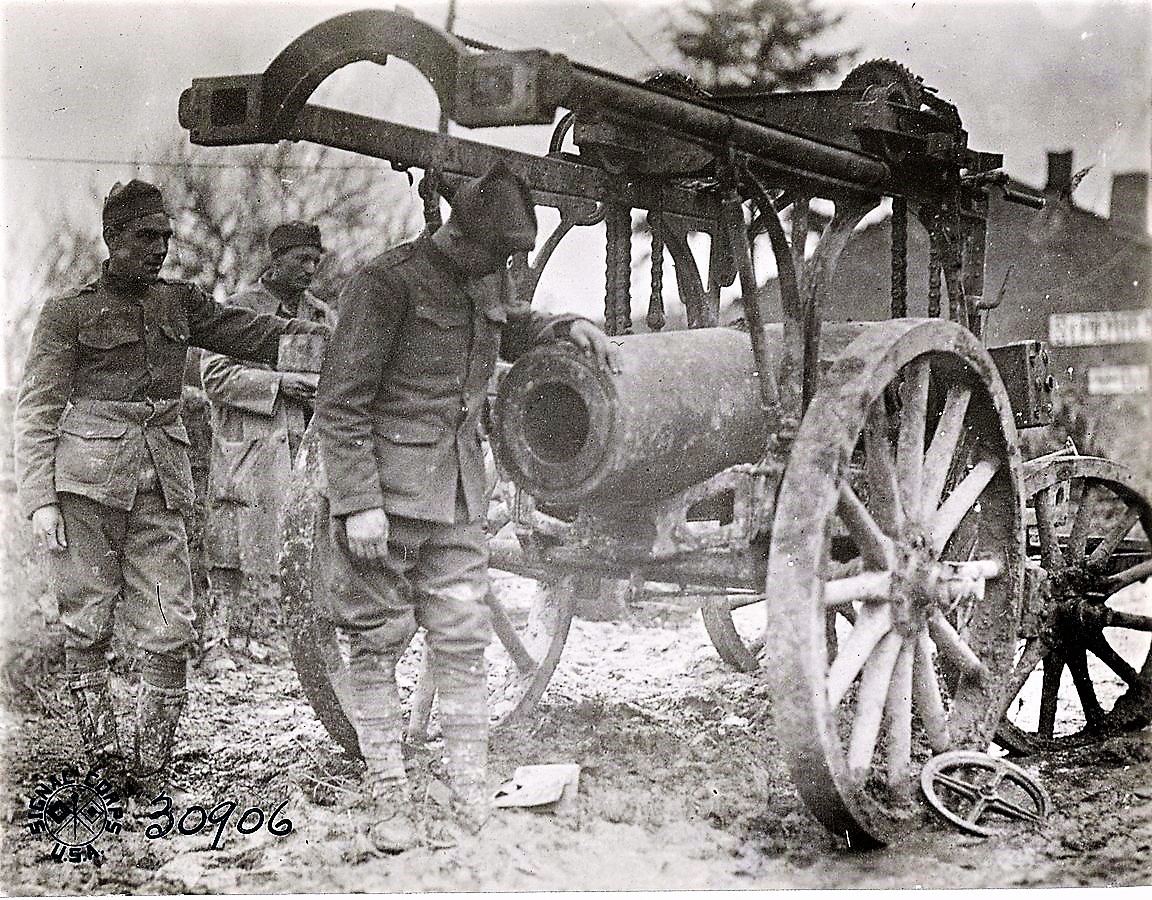
A captured Mrs 99 barrel on its transport wagon.

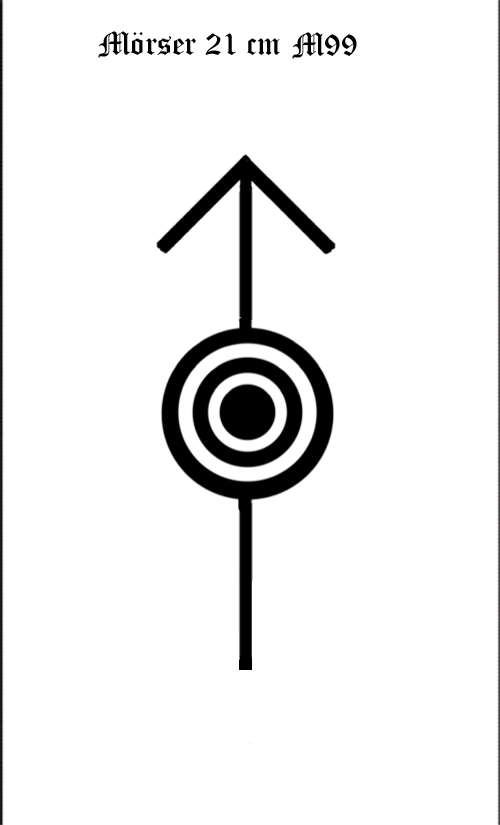
The tactical symbol for the Mrs 99.

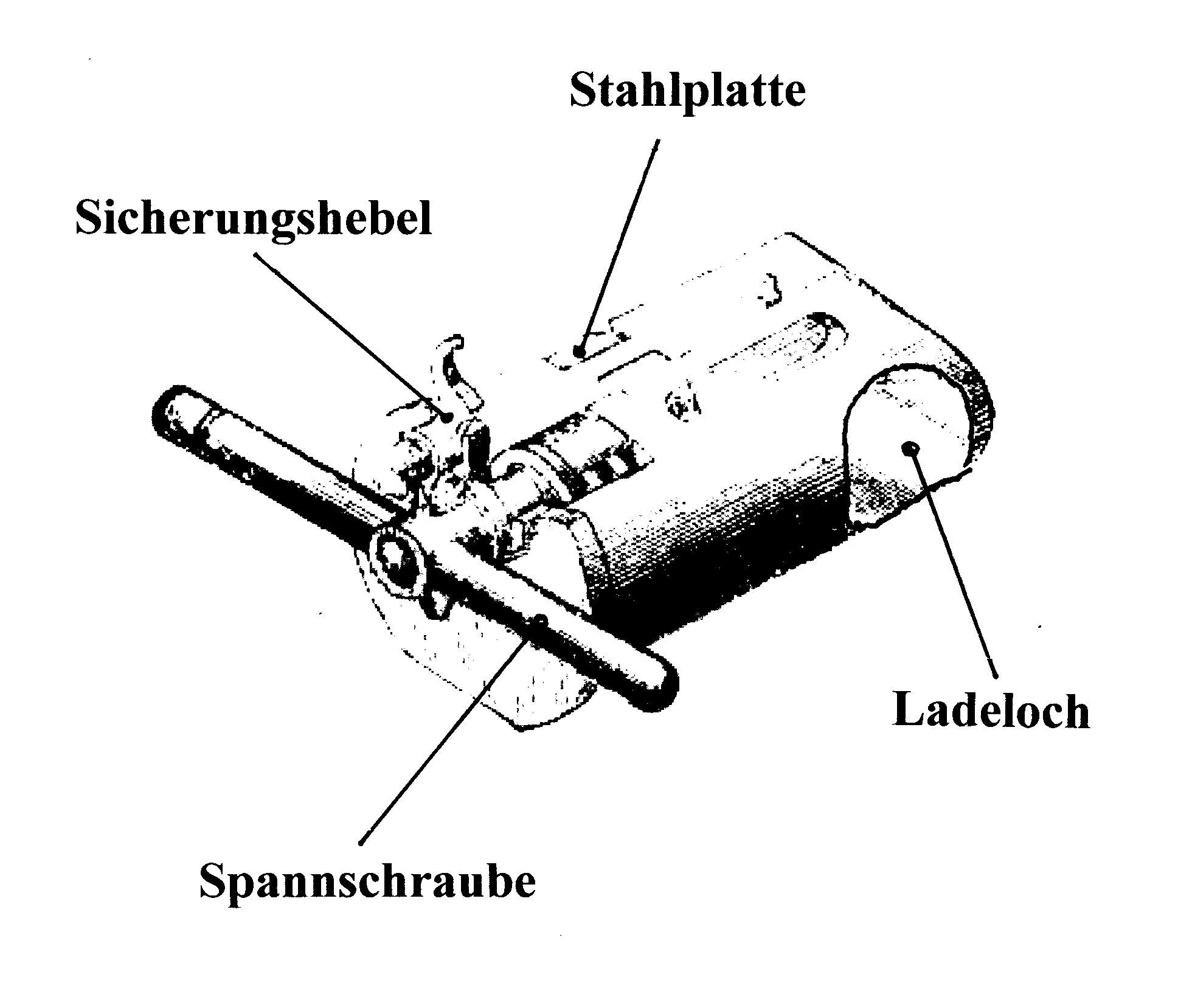
The Mrs 99's breech block.
