= 220 mm TR mle 1915/1916 =

Heavy howitzer

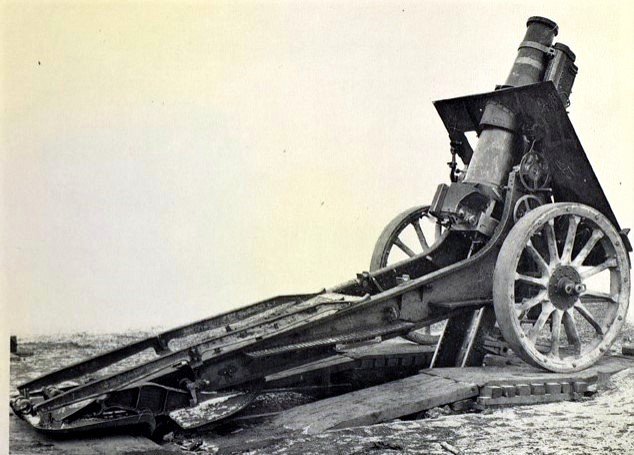
- A mle 1915/1916 at maximum elevation. Notice the pit dug to allow the gun to recoil.
- Type: Howitzer
- Place of origin: France

Service history
- In service: 1916–1945
- Used by: France; Nazi Germany
- Wars: World War I World War II

Production history
- Designer: Schneider et Cie
- Designed: 1915
- Manufacturer: Schneider et Cie
- Produced: 1915
- Variants: mle 1909 mle 1915 mle 1916

Specifications
- Mass: 7,455–7,792 kg (16,435–17,178 lb)
- Barrel length: 2.33 m (7 ft 8 in) 10.6 caliber
- Width: 2 m (6 ft 7 in)
- Height: 1.8 m (5 ft 11 in)
- Shell: Separate loading bagged charges and projectiles
- Shell weight: 100 kg (220 lb)
- Caliber: 220 mm (8.7 in)
- Breech: Interrupted screw
- Recoil: Hydro-pneumatic
- Carriage: Box trail
- Elevation: +10° to +65°
- Traverse: 6°
- Rate of fire: 2 rpm
- Muzzle velocity: 415 m/s (1,360 ft/s)
- Maximum firing range: 10.8 km (6.7 mi)

Mortier Schneider de 9" de seige Mortier de 9" Belgique Mortier de 9" Russie
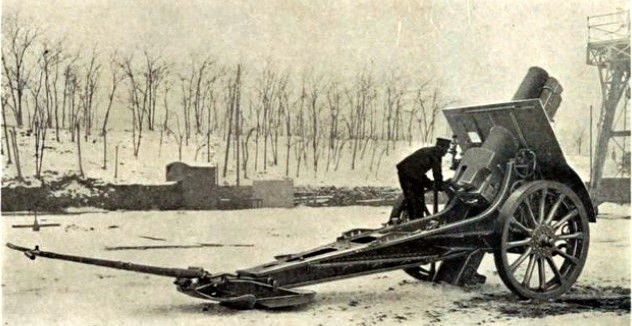
- The Belgian/Russian predecessor of the 220 mm TR mle 1915/1916

Service history
- In service: 1909-?
- Used by: Belgium; Russian Empire
- Wars: World War I

Specifications
- Mass: 5,975 kg (13,173 lb)
- Barrel length: 2.05 m (6 ft 9 in) 9 caliber
- Width: 2.13 m (7 ft)
- Height: 1.83 m (6 ft)
- Shell weight: Belgium: 172 kg (379 lb); Russia: 139 kg (306 lb)
- Caliber: 228.6 mm (9 in)
- Elevation: +10° to +60°
- Traverse: 6°
- Muzzle velocity: Belgium: 260 m/s (850 ft/s); Russia: 270 m/s (890 ft/s)
- Maximum firing range: Belgium: 6.2 km (3.9 mi); Russia: 6.6 km (4.1 mi)

The Mortier de 220 mm Tir Rapide modèle 1915/1916 Schneider or 220 mm TR mle 1915/1916 was a French howitzer designed and produced during the First World War. A number were still on hand during the Second World War and served in Belgian, French and German service.

== History ==
Before the First World War, the doctrine of the French Army was geared towards a war of rapid maneuver. Consequently, attention was focused on light mobile field guns such as the Canon de 75 modèle 1897 with little consideration given to heavy artillery. As the Western Front settled into trench warfare, the light field guns that the combatants went to war with were beginning to show their limitations when facing an enemy who was now dug into prepared positions. Indirect fire, interdiction, and counter-battery fire emphasized the importance of long-range heavy artillery.

The 43 kg (95 lb) projectiles from the heaviest howitzer available the 155 mm CTR Mle 1904, were found to be ineffective against deeply dug in German positions. The heaviest pieces available were the de Bange 220 mm mle 1880/1891 mortars. However, these lacked mobility, had a range of only 7 km (4.3 mi) and a slow rate of fire (1 round every three minutes) and required large crews to dig positions and erect wooden firing platforms before use.

== Design ==
In 1909 Schneider had produced a 228.6 mm (9 in) mortar given the designations Mortier Schneider de 9" de seige, Mortier de 9" Belgique, Mortier de 9" Russie in Schneider catalogs for Belgium and Russia. The Belgian/Russian mortar was similar in design to the mle 1915/1916 but was lighter, had a shorter barrel, had shorter range, and fired heavier projectiles. Schneider also decided to develop a 220 mm version in order to use existing stocks of de Bange ammunition. These projectiles weighed about 100 kg (220 lb) which made shell handling an issue. The solution was a set folding rails which went from the breech to end of the box trail. Between shots, the barrel was lowered and the projectile was slid on a stretcher up the rails to the breech for ramming home.

The first order for 40 howitzers was issued in October 1915, with the first deliveries beginning in 1916. The new howitzer designated the Mortier de 220 mm Tir Rapide Modèle 1915 surpassed the de Bange mortars performance with twice the rate of fire and a range of 10.8 km (6.7 mi). The howitzer's weight 7,455 kg (16,435 lb) was beyond the horse teams' towing capability, so it was designed to be broken down and transported in two loads. However, the axle of the new carriage was fragile and had to be towed at low speeds.

== Service ==
Battlefield experience suggested several enhancements to improve mobility: the installation of a sprung suspension, replacement of the curved axle with a straight axle, use of 14 spoke instead of 12 spoke wheels and solid rubber tires. The majority of these changes were incorporated in the new mle 1916, with the exception of a straight axle. The problem of low towing speed, which did not exceed a walking pace, remained unresolved throughout the life of the gun and represented its greatest shortcoming. The increasing availability of artillery tractors later in the war meant that the gun was often transported in one load, with the barrel withdrawn from battery and fastened to the box trail, a wheeled limber was then placed beneath the box trail.

The mle 1915/1916 was considered a successful design until the later stages of the First World War when battlefield mobility was restored and its slow towing speed limited its usefulness. With the armistice, the French army had 272 mle 1915/1916s in its inventory. During the inter-war years the mle 1915/1916 was placed in reserve and Belgium bought eight. At the beginning of Second World War, the French army deployed 376 mle 1915/16s of the 462 still available. When France signed an armistice in 1940, the German army used surviving pieces under the designation 22 cm Mörser 530(b) and 22 cm Mörser 531(f). The Spanish Blue Division used 7 captured French pieces at the Siege of Leningrad.

The 220 mortar returned to service with the French army after the liberation of France. In March 1945, twelve were in service.

== Gallery ==
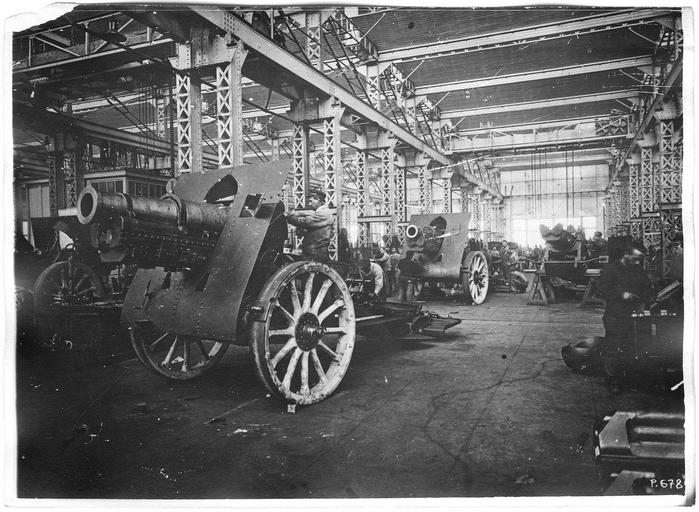
Mle 1915/1916s at the Le Havre factory.

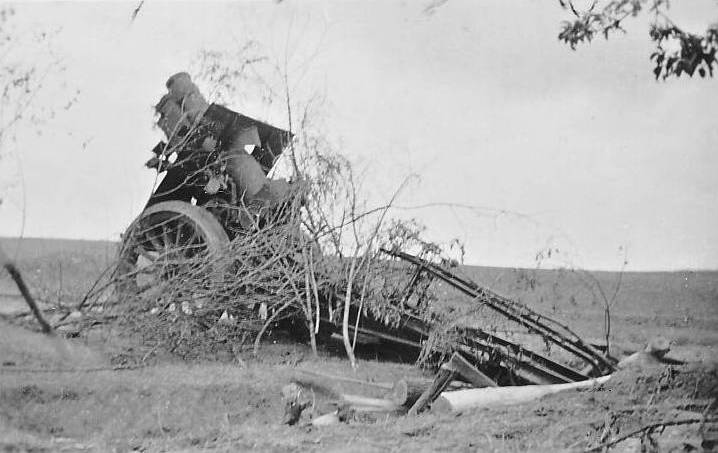
Abandoned French mle 1915/1916 May 1940

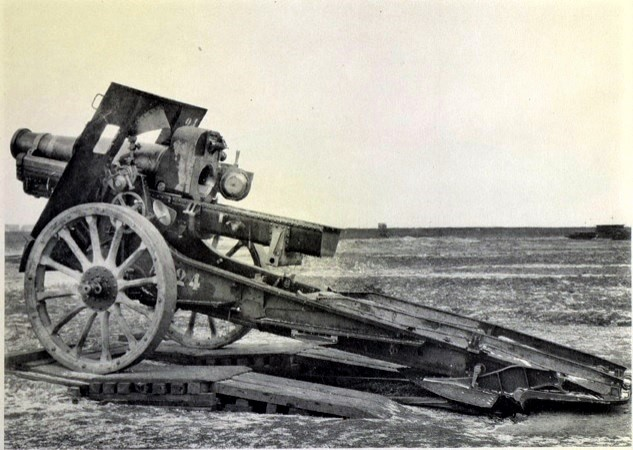
An mle 1915/1916 ready to be loaded.

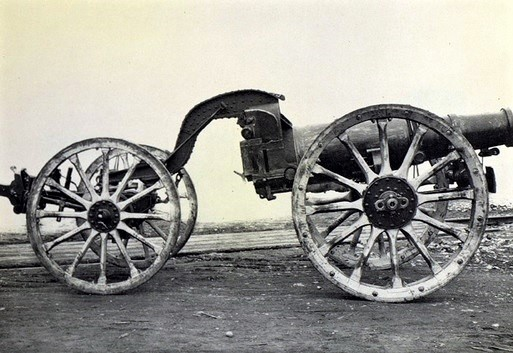
An mle 1915/1916 barrel being transported.

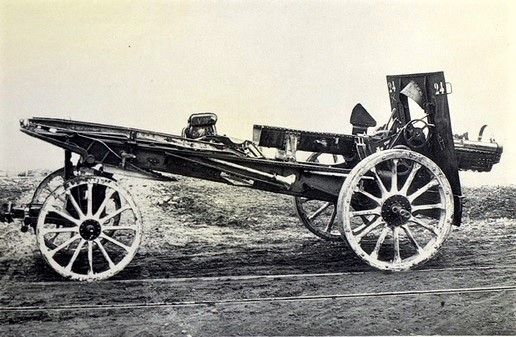
An mle 1915/1916 carriage being transported.
