= Flanders Fields =

English term for World War I battlefields

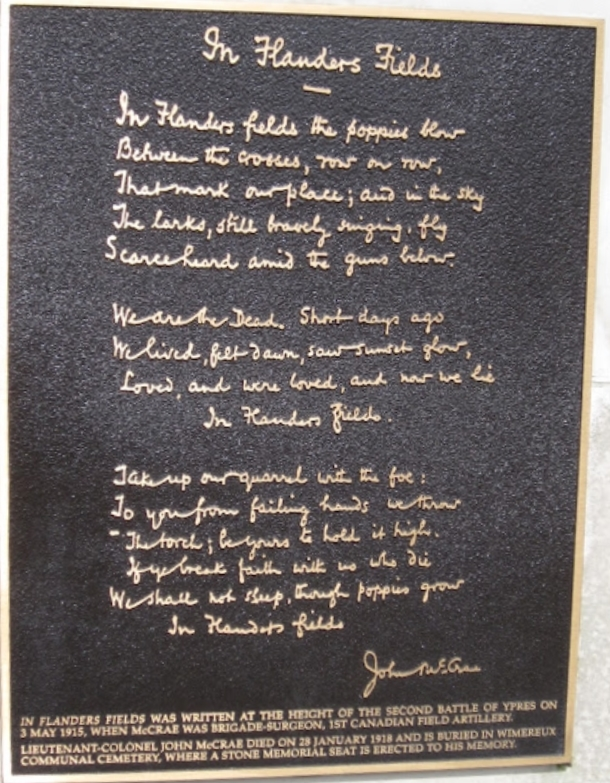
The memorial plaque to the poem "In Flanders Fields"

Flanders Fields (Dutch: Vlanderens Velden; French: Les Champs de Flandre) is a common English name of the World War I battlefields in an area straddling the Belgian provinces of West Flanders and East Flanders as well as the French department of Nord, part of which makes up the area known as French Flanders.

== Description ==
The name Flanders Fields is particularly associated with battles that took place in the Ypres Salient, including the Second Battle of Ypres and the Battle of Passchendaele. For most of the war, the front line ran continuously from south of Nieuwpoort on the Belgian coast, across Flanders Fields into the centre of Northern France before moving eastwards and it was known as the Western Front.

The phrase was popularized by a poem, "In Flanders Fields", by Canadian Lieutenant-Colonel John McCrae which was inspired by his service during the Second Battle of Ypres.

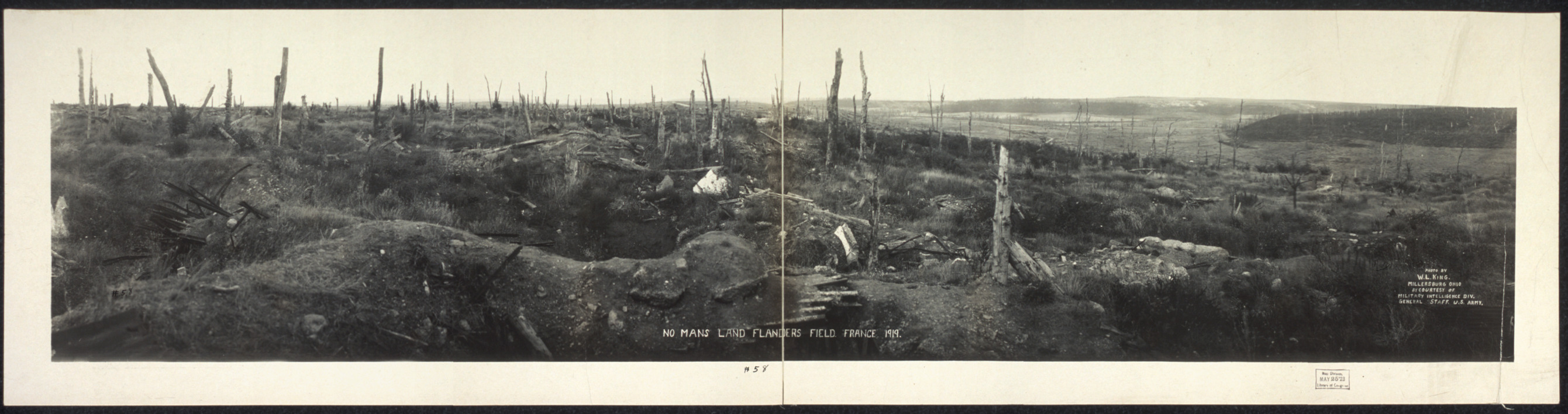
Trenches and No Man's Land at Flanders Fields.

== See also ==
- Flanders Field American Cemetery and Memorial
- In Flanders Fields Museum
- Lange Max Museum
- Red poppy
- La leggenda del Piave
