= List of books on military executions in World War I =

This is a bibliography of works on military executions in World War I.

== In English ==
- Babington, Anthony, For the Sake of Example: Capital Courts-Martial, 1914–1920, (London: Penguin. 2002) ISBN 978-0-14-139100-7
- Chielens, Piet & Putkowski, Julian; Unquiet Graves / Rusteloze Graven Guide: Execution Sites of the First World War in Flanders (UK: Francis Boutle Publishers, 2000) ISBN 978-1-903427-00-2
- Corns, Caroline & Hughes-Wilson, John; Blindfold and Alone (London, Cassell. 2001) ISBN 0-304-35397-3
- Corrigan, Gordon, Mud, Blood and Poppycock (London: Weidenfeld Military. 2004) ISBN 978-0-304-36659-0
- Godefroy, Andrew, For Freedom and Honour? The Story of 25 Canadians Executed During the Great War (Toronto: CEF Books, 1998) ISBN 1-896979-22-X
- Lister, David; Die Hard, Aby!, (England: Pen & Sword, 2005) ISBN 978-1-84415-137-0
- Moore, William, The Thin Yellow Line, (London: Wordsworth. 1999) ISBN 978-1-84022-215-9
- Oram, Gerard, Death Sentences passed by military courts of the British Army 1914–1924, (UK: Francis Boutle Publishers, 1999) ISBN 1-903427-26-6
- Oram, Gerard; Worthless Men: Race, eugenics and the death penalty in the British Army during the First World War, (UK: Francis Boutle Publishers, 1999) ISBN 0-9532388-3-0
- Pugsley, Chris; On the Fringes of Hell (1991: Hodder & Stoughton) ISBN 978-0-340-53321-5
- Putkowski, Julian & Sykes, Julian; Shot at Dawn: Executions in World War One by Authority of the British Army Act, (England: Pen & Sword, 1996) ISBN 978-0-85052-613-4
- Putkowski, Julian; British Army Mutineers 1914–1922, (UK: Francis Boutle Publishers, 1998) ISBN 978-0-9532388-2-8
- Putkowski, Julian; The Kinmel Park Camp riots 1919, (England: Flintshire Historical Society. 1989) ISBN 978-0-9512776-1-4 (however none of the rioters were executed)
- Sellers, Leonard; For God's Sake Shoot Straight! (Leo Cooper, London, UK, 1995) (an account of the trial and execution of Royal Navy officer Sub-Lt Edwin Dyett)
- Thurtle, Ernest; Military discipline and democracy, (London: Daniel Books. 1920)
- Thurtle, Ernest; Shootings at dawn: The Army death penalty at work, (Pamphlet)

== In French ==
- fr:Soldat fusillé pour l'exemple
- Offenstadt, Nicolas; Les fusillés de la Grande Guerre (Paris: Éditions Odile Jacob, 1999)
- Pedroncini, Guy; Les mutineries de 1917, Presse universitaires de France, Paris, 1967
- Putkowski, Julian (trans. Yves Buffetaut); Les Fusillés de King Crater (II) (France: Ysec éditions, 2002) ISBN 2-84673-012-1
- Rolland, Denis; La grève des tranchées, Paris, Imago, 2005.
