= Oram =

Oram is an Old Norse surname particularly found in the North of England. Notable people with this surname are:

- Albert Oram, Baron Oram (1913–1999), British politician; MP from East Ham South
- Alice Lawrence Oram ((1864–1948)), British journalist and translator living in Portugal
- Andrew Oram (born 1975), English cricketer
- Chandre Oram (contemporary), Indian man who has a tail; believed by some to be an incarnation of Hanuman
- Christopher Oram (contemporary), British theatre set and costume designer
- Daphne Oram (1925–2003), British composer and electronic musician; creator of the "Oramics" technique
- Eddie Oram (1914–2004), American basketball player
- Gerard Oram (contemporary), British cultural and social historian
- Jacob Oram (born 1978), New Zealand cricketer
- Jual Oram (born 1961), Indian politician representing the Sundargarh constituency of Orissa in the Indian parliament
- Kenneth Oram (1919–2001), clergyman
- Matthew Oram (1885–1969), New Zealand politician, MP for Manawatu
- Nick Oram (born 1979), American television producer and actor
- Neil Oram (born 1938) British musician, poet, artist and playwright
- Paul Oram (contemporary), Canadian politician from Newfoundland and Labrador
- Richard Oram (contemporary), Scottish historian, professor, and author
- Rod Oram (1950–2024), New Zealand journalist, columnist, and radio commentator
- Sarah Oram (1860–1946), British nurse
- Steve Oram (born 1973), English comedian, actor, writer, and musician
- Tara Oram (born 1984), Canadian singer and Canadian Idol finalist
- William Oram (1711–1777), English painter and architect
- Wilma Oram (1916–2001), Australian Army nurse during World War II

== See also ==
- ORAM (organization, now part of Alight, UNHCR partner Organization advocating for (LGBTI) Refuge, Asylum & Migration
- Oblivious RAM
- Apostolides v Orams
