= Berlinde De Bruyckere =

Belgian artist (born 1964)

- Born: 1964 (age 61–62); Ghent, Belgium
- Known for: Sculpture

Berlinde De Bruyckere (born 1964) is a Belgian contemporary artist who works in sculpture and installation. Her sculptures use body-like forms . Her work is influenced by religious imagery, mythology, and the Flemish Renaissance. Themes in her artwork display human experience, existence, and raw emotion.

== Early life and education ==
Berlinde De Bruyckere was born in Ghent, Belgium, in 1964. Her dad worked as a butcher, which desensitized her to seeing corpses. De Bruyckere's studio in Ghent was once a Catholic school, and what used to be the headmaster's home is where her family lives. At the beginning of her artistic career, she had to convince her parents to let her go to the art academy, and in order to fund her studies, she gave drawing lessons.

In her youth, De Bruyckere was sent to Catholic boarding school which would later influence her artwork. She graduated from the LUCA School of Arts in Ghent in 1986, and did her residency at the In Flanders Field Museum. In 2013, she visited a skin-trader workshop in Anderlecht, Belgium, which expanded her repertoire, and she began working with wax casts of animal hides.

== Art making ==
De Bruyckere uses a variety of mediums, such as animal skin, wood, metal, watercolor, and gouache. Before working on the life-size sculptures for her exhibitions, De Brucyckere would make a scale model of the artwork rather than sketching it out. Throughout the 1990s and 2000s, De Bruyckere would make large cast wax sculptures of human figures. Specifically in the early 1990s many of her major works have featured structures involving blankets. Their use is symbolic both of warmth and shelter, and of the vulnerable circumstances such as wars that make people seek such shelter. As De Bruyckere works on her piece, she pays attention to the details, such as the surfaces of her work, to express the meaning of her art. Additionally, she tends to use props that connect with her story's artwork.

== Artworks ==
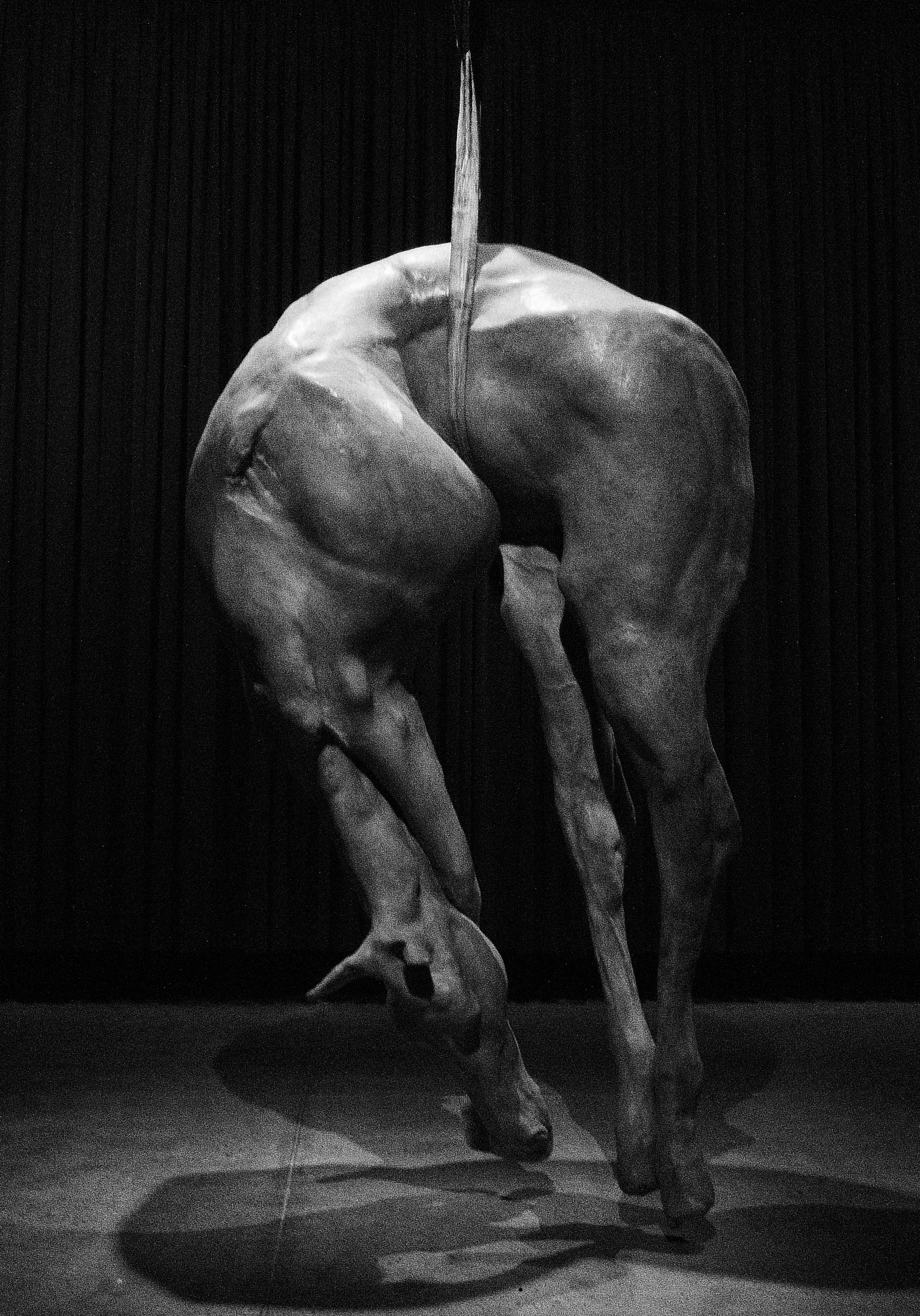
PXIII, Museum of Old and New Art (MONA), Hobart, Tasmania, Australia

Arcangelo I (2022-2023) is part of De Bruyckere A Simple Prophecy exhibition. The sculpture is made out of bronze, lead, and chrome steel. It was made during the COVID-19 pandemic and is a tribute to healthcare workers and how they had a major role during the pandemic as they were taking care of many patients during that time. In her previous works, the body figures either do not have a head or their head is covered. Arcangelo I is an example of this method. The angel's body is in a still position, covered with a cloth-like texture, making the face hidden from the viewer and their wings faintly extending. The Angel is slightly hovered yet weighted down as it represents it being burden, by the weight it is carrying. It's mysterious yet comforting and inviting to the viewer. The cloth-like texture is an influence from De Bruyckere's past works, as she would use blankets as an element in her art as they symbolize intimacy and protection. Furthermore, Bruyckere got inspiration from Christianity and how she connects it with blankets, as she believes religion should give comfort and hope.

The K36 (The Black Horse) (2003) is made from horse skin, wood, iron, and polyurethane foam. It is a mutilated horse that has no facial futures, and its upper body and front legs are crouching down and touching the surface of the table that it is on top of. Horses have been a subject that Bruyckere has used repeatedly. It was first introduced in her exhibition In Flanders Fields. When Bruyckere was doing her residency at the In Flanders Field Museum, she found photos of war horses that were dead on the battlefield, which inspired her to use horses as her subject. At that time, when she discovered the photos, the horses became a metaphor for death. When De Bruyckere uses horses, it becomes a whole different meaning as she puts them in different positions and changes their figures. Bruyckere uses animals to share physical vulnerability with animals, as horses are traditionally seen as strong and powerful.

Lost V (2021-2022) is a sculpture of a young horse laying on its side on the marble table and covered with a blanket. The material that was used for it was horse skin, marble, textile, iron, and epoxy. Besides being influenced by her past exhibition of In Flanders Field of war horse, she was also influenced by Francisco de Zurbarán's Agnus Dei. The sculpture gives the illusion that the body of the horse is either dead, alive, or between life and death, and the blanket around it is used as a self-protection. Its a reminder of death and how humans feel about death and mortality.

== Select exhibitions ==
=== Solo ===
- 2024: Berlinde De Bruyckere: City of Refuge III, Abbazia di San Giorgio Maggiore, Venice, Italy.
- 2024: Berlinde De Bruyckere: No Life Lost, Artipelag, Stockholm, Sweden.
- 2023: Berlinde De Bruyckere: Crossing a bridge on fire, MAC/CCB Museum of Contemporary Art, Lisbon, Portugal
- 2023: Berlinde De Bruyckere: City of Refugee II, Diözesan museum Freising, Freising, Germany
- 2023: Berlinde De Bruyckere: City of Refugee I, Commanderie de Peyrassol, Flassans sur Issole, France.
- 2022: Berlinde De Bruyckere: Plunder/ Ekphrasis, Montpellier, MO.CO. Montpellier Contemporain, France.
- 2022: Berlinde De Bruyckere: PEL/ Becoming the figure, Arp Museum, Remagen, Germany.
- 2021: Berlinde De Bruyckere: Engelenkeel, Bonnefantenmuseum, Maastricht, The Netherlands
- 2020: Berlinde De Bruyckere, Middelheimmuseum, Antwerp, Belgium.
- 2019: Aletheia, Fondazione Sandretto Re Rebaudengo, Turin.
- 2019: Berlinde De Bruyckere, San Sebastian, Rubenshuis, Antwerp, Belgium.
- 2019: A single bed, a single room, Galleria Continua, San Gimignano, Italy.
- 2019: It almost seemed a lily, Hof Van Busleyden, Mechelen, Belgium.
- 2017: Berlinde de Bruyckere: Embalmed, Kunsthal Aarhus, Aarhus, Denmark
- 2013: Berlinde De Bruyckere: In the Flesh, Kunsthaus Graz, Graz, Austria
- 2011: Berlinde De Bruyckere, DHC/ART Foundation for Contemporary Art, Montreal, Canada
- 2004: Berlinde De Bruyckere, Hauser & Wirth, Zurich, Switzerland
- 2000: In Flanders Fields, In Flanders Fields Museum, Ieper, Belgium
- 1997: De Slaapzaal, Kunstvereniging Diepenheim, Diepenheim, The Netherlands.
- 1994: Washington Velvets (Two from Flanders), The Corcoran Gallery of Art, Washington DC, USA.
- 1993: Huis, Galerie Joost Declercq, Ghent, Belgium.
- 1991: Berlinde De Bruyckere, Gallerie van Academie, Kasteel Blauwendael, Waasmunster, Belgium.
- 1990: Reflecting on Confinement and death, Museo Dhondt-Dhaenens, Deurle, Belgium.
- 1990: Berlinde De Bruyckere, Galleria S. & H. de Buck, Gent, Belgium.
- 1988: Berlinde De Bruyckere, Galleria Fred Lanzenberg, Brussel, Belgium.

=== Group ===
- 2023: The Embodied Spirit, White Cube, Seoul, Korea.
- 2022: Strange: Sandretto Re Rebaudengo Collection, Centro Andaluz de Arte Contemporáneo, Seville, Spain
- 2020: Still Still Life, Sara Hildén Art Museum, Tampere, Finland
- 2017: Beyond The Pleasure Principle: Affective Operations in Art, Zachęta National Gallery of Art, Warsaw, Poland
- 2014: Barockt, Kulturhuset, Stockholm, Sweden
- 2011: Shape of Things to Come, Saatchi Gallery, London, UK
- 2005: Baroque and Neobaroque: The Hell of the Beautiful, Artium, Salamanca, Spain
- 2000: Selection Summer 2000, The Drawing Center, New York NY
- 1995: La condition humaine, een confrontatie, Witte Zaal, Ghent, Belgium
- 1990: Ateliers d'été / Sommeratelier, Deutsche Messe AG, Hanover, Germany

== Collections ==
De Bruyckere's artwork can be found in numerous public collections including The Museum of Modern Art, New York; Fondazione Sandretto Re Rebaudengo, Turin; Collezione Gori Fattoria di Cella, Pistoia: and La Fondation Antoine de Galbert, Paris.

== Other activities ==
In 2026, De Bruyckere served on the jury of the Marcel Duchamp Prize.

== Honor and awards ==
- 2015, Honorary doctorate from Ghent University
- 2013, Selected to represent Belgium at the 55th Venice Biennale along with J.M. Coetzee a Nobel Prize winner in Literature
- 1986, Recipient of the Young Belgian Art Prize

== Publications ==
Bruyckere has been featured in several catalogue raisonnés including: Berlinde de Bruyckere (2014), Cripplewood/ Kreupelhout (2013), We are All Flesh (2013), Berlinde de Bruyckere Romeu My Deer (2012), Berlinde De Bruyckere Pel/ Becoming the figure (2022), Berlinde De Bruckere The Embalmer (2015), and Berlinde De Bruyckere: Angel’s Throat (2021).

== See also ==
- Watercolor painting
- Gouache
- Dutch and Flemish Renaissance painting
- LUCA School of Arts
- Sculpture
- Flanders Field Museum
- Francisco de Zurbarán
- Lamb of God
