= Herbert Cyrus Farnum =

American painter (1866–1926)

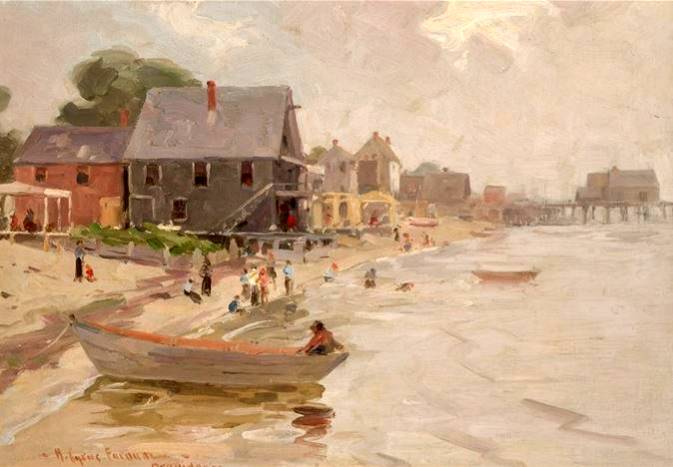
View of Providence

Herbert Cyrus Farnum (September 19, 1866 – February 15, 1926) was an American landscape painter in the late 19th and early 20th century. Born in Glocester, Rhode Island, he became well known for his paintings of Algiers and other parts of Africa, as orientalism was a trend during this time period in American history.

== Early life ==
"Cy" Farnum, as he was more generally known, was a son of Cyrus A. and Mary (Eddy) Farnum. He was a descendant from old New England settlers who trace their history to Ralph and Alice Farnham of England who settled in Ipswich, Massachusetts. in 1635. The first of the name to settle in Rhode Island was John Farnum, a grandson of Ralph the immigrant, who moved from Uxbridge, Massachusetts to Georgiaville, Rhode Island. in 1755. As a boy he gave evidence of the great talent that he later developed as an artist.

== Education ==
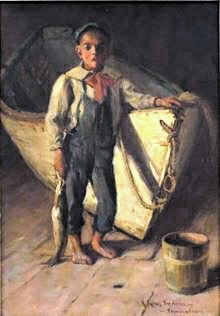
Boy with a Fish

He was a pupil of the Rhode Island School of Design. Farnum studied at the Academie Julian in Paris under Jean-Paul Laurens and (Benjamin) Jean-Joseph Benjamin-Constant where he won several awards for drawings. He also studied at Académie Colarossi in the evening, studying figure drawing under Jean-Léon Gérôme and Castaigne. He also had the advantage of criticism from Adolphe William Bouguereau. His most remarkable canvas of that period was his Tarantella.

== Career ==
On July 21, 1896, a large landscape entitled "Piccolo Piazza, Ana Capri" was accepted by the Royal Academy of Arts, London, a distinction accorded few American artists.

He returned abroad in April 1904, when he was absent for 2 years which he spent in London, Paris and then in Madrid and Algiers and later spent considerable time in Italy, with special stay at Capri.

He belonged in the group of late 19th- and early 20th-century artists in Rhode Island, and for years his studio in Butler Exchange was an important art centre in the city of Providence. He painted many portraits of local politicians while occupying this studio.

After pursuing his art studies in Paris he spent many years in travel and study abroad, following in the footsteps of Marcus Waterman, also a noted RI artist, in Northern Africa, winning a wide reputation for his African subjects.

He also painted a number of official portraits for city and state, some of which still hang in the Rhode Island state house and the city hall. A number of lovely studies of children, notably of his nephew, Earl F. C. Farnum, and his daughter, Elodie Farnum, the musical genius whose death at an early age was a great blow to him.

== Personal life ==
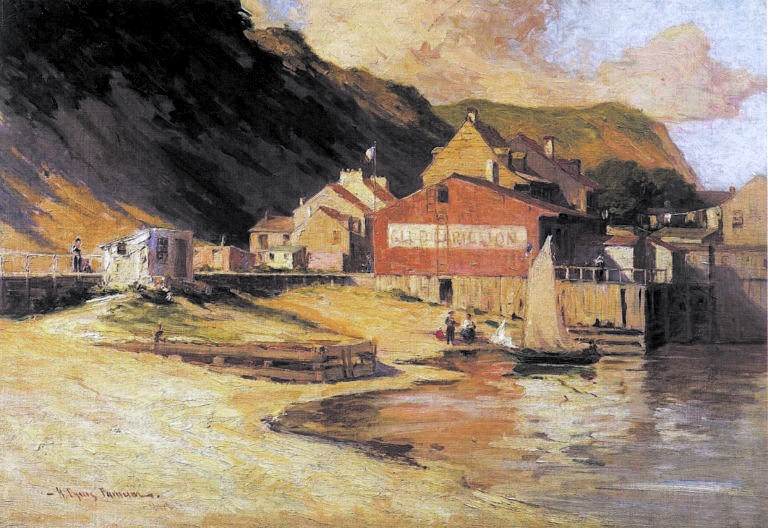
The Club Carollion

He was married twice. His first wife was Alice Leigh of Fall River, Massachusetts, to whom he was married in 1898 in Chelsea. To them was born one child, a daughter, Elodie, who gave great promise of becoming a violinist of distinction and was looked upon as one of the most remarkable girls in the city. Her death in 1914 was a tragedy in the artist's life. His wife, inseparable companion of his daughter, failed gradually in health after her child's death and died in December, 1920. The memory of young Elodie Farnum, as well as her portrait by the artist, survives in the library at the Rochambeau branch of the Providence public library.

He was a prominent figure in RI cycling history, was a veteran member of the RI wheelmen and rated high as a road and track rider. He was captain of the club for many years.

In his later years he maintained his studio at his home on Fruit Hill section of North Providence. He was stricken by a cerebral hemorrhage at home on February 15, 1926, and did not recover, leaving his second wife Mabel (Carter) Farnum. He was a president of the Providence Water Color Club and member of the Providence Art Club. His works are widely owned in Rhode Island.
