= John Lynn (VC) =

Recipient of the Victoria Cross

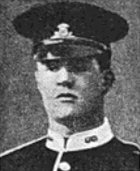
- Born: 1887; Forest Hill, London, England
- Died: 3 May 1915 (aged 27); Wieltje, Ypres salient, Belgium
- Burial place: Vlamertinghe Churchyard (grave lost); Memorial headstone in Grootebeek British Cemetery, Reningelst
- Military career
- Allegiance: United Kingdom
- Branch: British Army
- Service years: 1901–1913, 1914–1915
- Rank: Private
- Nickname: Jackie Lynn
- Units: The Lancashire Fusiliers
- Conflicts: World War I: Western Front; Second Battle of Ypres (DOW)
- Awards: Victoria Cross; Distinguished Conduct Medal; Cross of the Order of St. George, 4th Class (Russia)

John Lynn VC DCM (a.k.a. Jackie Lynn; 1887 – 3 May 1915) was an English recipient of the Victoria Cross, the highest and most prestigious award for gallantry in the face of the enemy that can be awarded to British and Commonwealth forces.

== Biography ==
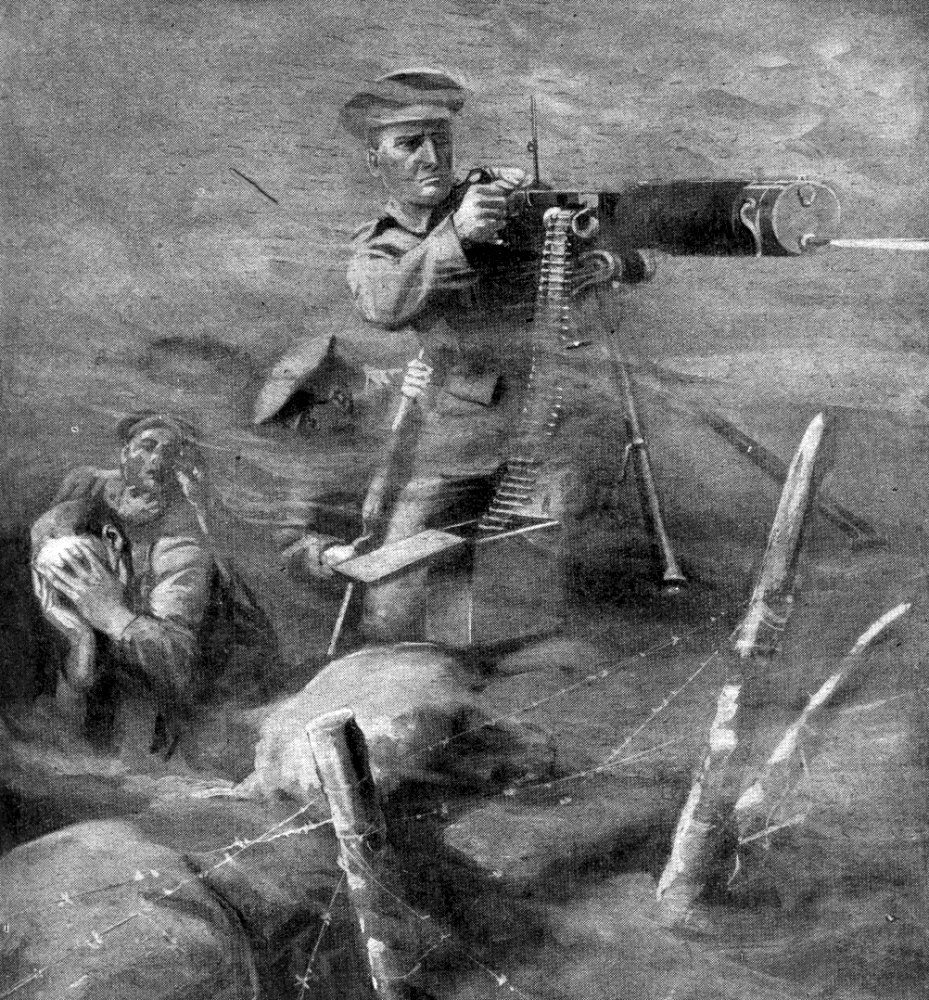
Drawing of Private Lynn's VC action from The War Illustrated, 24 July 1915

He was 27 years old, and a private in the 2nd Battalion, The Lancashire Fusiliers, British Army during the First World War when the following deed took place for which he was awarded the VC.

On 2 May 1915 near Ypres, Belgium, when the Germans were advancing behind their wave of asphyxiating gas, Private Lynn, although almost overcome by the deadly fumes, handled his machine-gun with great effect against the enemy, and when he could not see them, he moved his gun higher up the parapet so that he could fire more effectively. This eventually checked any further advance and the outstanding courage displayed by this soldier had a great effect upon his comrades in the very trying circumstances. Private Lynn died the next day from the effects of gas poisoning.

Lynn was also awarded the Cross of the Order of St. George, 4th Class (Russia).

His Victoria Cross is displayed at the Fusilier Museum, Bury, Greater Manchester.

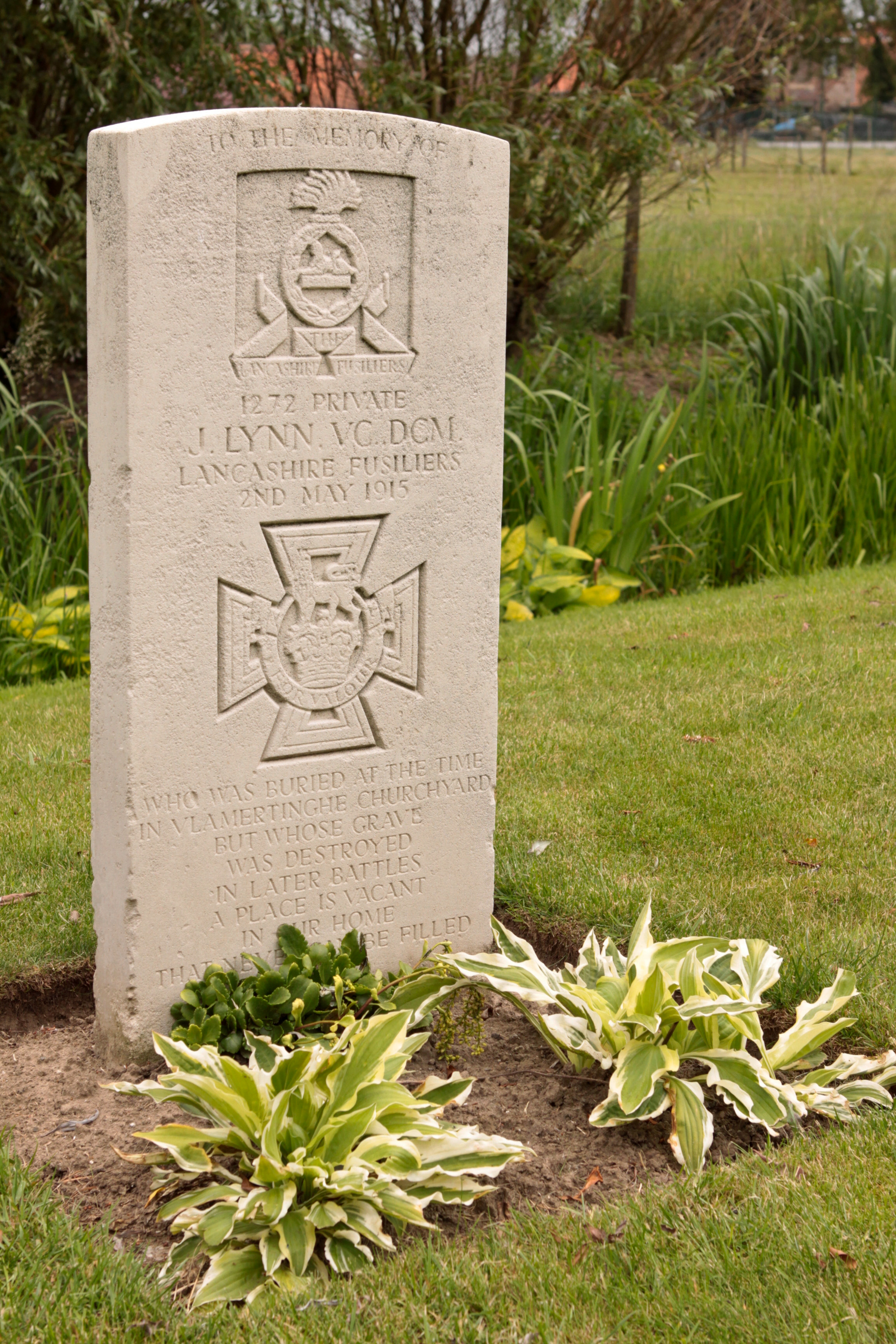
Lynn's memorial marker

John Lynn's original grave (now lost) was in Vlamertinghe Churchyard. A memorial headstone is in Grootebeek British Cemetery, bearing the inscription: WHO WAS BURIED AT THE TIME IN VLAMERTINGHE CHURCHYARD BUT WHOSE GRAVE WAS DESTROYED IN LATER BATTLES A PLACE IS VACANT IN OUR HOME THAT NEVER CAN BE FILLED.

== Bibliography ==
- Batchelor, Peter; Matson, Christopher (2011). The Western Front 1915. VCs of the First World War. Stroud, Gloucestershire: The History Press. ISBN 978-0-7524-6057-4.
- Buzzell, Nora, ed. (1997). The Register of the Victoria Cross. Cheltenham, Gloucestershire: This England Alma House. ISBN 0-906324-27-0.
- Oldfield, Paul (2014). Victoria Crosses on the Western Front August 1914–April 1915: Mons to Hill 60. Pen and Sword Books. ISBN 978-1783030439.
