= Marcus Waterman =

American painter (1834–1914)

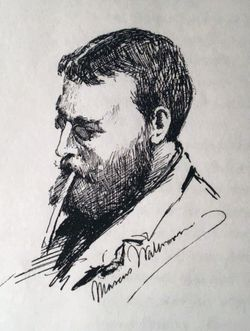
- Waterman, self-portrait c. 1890
- Born: September 1, 1834; Providence, Rhode Island, U.S.
- Died: April 2, 1914 (aged 79); Maderno, Italy
- Education: Thomas Hill and William Morris Hunt
- Known for: Painter
- Movement: Orientalist

Marcus ("Mark") Waterman (1 September 1834 – 2 April 1914) was an American painter, mainly of landscapes and Orientalist subjects.

== Life ==
Waterman was born in Providence, Rhode Island to William Henry and Martha Burrill Pearce Waterman, oldest of six siblings, including a brother, William Clarence Waterman, who survived him. He graduated from Brown University in 1857 and moved to New York, where for twenty years he kept a studio in the New York University building. His training is unclear; some sources claim that he was entirely self-taught, while others, including Waterman himself, claim that he either worked with or was influenced by Thomas Hill and William Morris Hunt. Before moving to New York he was part of a group of "art enthusiasts" in Providence, including Thomas Harris Robinson, John N. Arnold, James Morgan Lewin, and Frederick Stone Batcheller; Robinson would go on to be a friend of his for many years. Waterman is known to have attended a life drawing class at the National Academy of Design during the 1858–1859 academic year. In the former year, he began exhibiting at the academy as well, a habit which he kept up as long as he lived in the city. Early on, he chose to specialize in landscape painting, and many of the pictures he showed at the academy were in this vein. He was elected an associate of the academy in 1861.

In 1874, Waterman accompanied a group of painters including Hunt on a sketching trip along the Massachusetts coast, and as a result soon resettled in Boston. He maintained studio/apartments on Washington Street and Hamilton Place in Boston's theater and art district from 1877 through 1909. He also spent much time traveling in the 1870s, 1880s and 1890s; among his destinations were the Netherlands, France, southern Spain, and North Africa. Visiting Algiers was a revelation to the artist, and he said in an 1894 interview that "for the first time he felt at home". Having first visited in 1879, he returned there a second time, staying between 1884 and 1886. He continued depicting American subjects as well, favoring the beaches of Cape Cod and the mountains of Vermont.

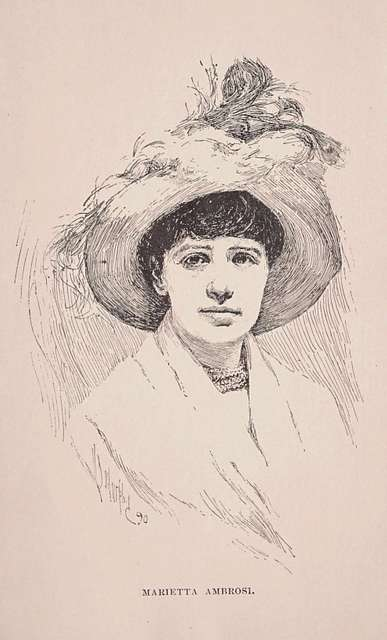
Marietta Ambrosi (1852-1921) 1890 frontis portrait from Italian Child-Life

At some point early in his tenure in Boston, Waterman began a romantic relationship with artist's model, costumer and Italian language teacher, Marietta Ambrosi, that lasted the rest of his life. Maria “Marietta” Giacinta Massimigliana Ambrosi was born in 1852 in the northeastern Italian city of Rovereto, which at that time was a municipality in the County of Tyrol in the Austrian Empire. Her father was born in Brescia, Italy, but her mother was from Dorchester, Massachusetts. She immigrated to Boston in 1871. She returned to Europe for extended periods in 1878 and 1882, and in Paris, she reportedly “became very popular among the big artists as a model. She was an especial favorite with Falero, the Spanish painter.” Back in Boston in 1884, she set up shop as teacher and translator of Italian and French in the same building as Waterman and soon became “a good deal of a pet among the artists [...] Her naturalness – her genuineness – appealed to Mark Waterman from the beginning [...] And there is no doubt but she brought a great deal of sunshine into the life of this quiet man years before they were married. She was the one person who understood him.” Ambrosi posed for at least four extant Waterman paintings in the 1880s and 90s – Portrait of a Young Woman, Spanish Toreador, Yasemeen, and Portrait of the Artist’s Wife. Waterman and Ambrosi eventually married in Boston in 1908. Waterman reportedly “wanted to marry Marietta years before, but his mother did not desire that he should, and out of his deep love for his aged mother he put off the marriage until she died” in 1907.

In spring 1909, Waterman attended an exhibition of paintings by the Spanish artist Joaquín Sorolla and was deeply shaken by his immediate recognition that Sorolla had mastered with apparent ease a style of painting that he himself had struggled with his entire life. He was so disturbed by the experience that he reportedly returned to his studio to close his paintbox, never to open it again, and destroyed all but a few of his pictures there. Wishing to leave behind what he felt was his failure in America, he and Marietta retired later the same year to Lake Garda, Italy, near Marietta's childhood home in Brescia, returning to Boston only briefly in 1911 to settle business affairs. He died in Maderno, Italy, on 2 April 1914, and was cremated and inurned at Cimitero Vantiniano in Brescia on April 8. His brother Clarence erected a cenotaph to him at Swan Point Cemetery in Providence, Rhode Island. Marietta returned to Boston and lived with her sister in Watertown, Massachusetts, until her sister’s death in 1920. She revisited Brescia in 1921, caught pneumonia and died there on 5 June 1921, and was inurned next her husband at Cimitero Vantiniano. Waterman was described after his death as a man of broad intellect and a deep thinker, something of a philosopher; he was said to hold the average American art buyer in contempt, and was well-off enough to enjoy the art of painting for itself, rather than for any pecuniary reasons. Boston Globe art editor A. J. Philpott wrote in his obituary:

Mark Waterman was a proud man and considerable of a recluse […] Yet, though dignified and reserved to strangers, [… he] was always cheerful, companionable and helpful to those who knew him well and had his confidence. Many artists when sorely troubled in their work benefited by his sympathetic and helpful advice and by the free-will offering of the results of his own studies and experiences.

He was a member of the Paint and Clay Club of Boston, of the American Watercolor Society, and the Artists Fund Society.

== Career ==
Though Waterman was primarily a painter of landscapes, he turned his hand to other genres at times during his career. An early attempt was a self-portrait of 1861, presented to the National Academy of Design upon presentation of his diploma the following year. He bore no fondness for the work, and a 1906 letter detailing his opinions of the painting survives:

"I regret to confess that I am the guilty party who painted the frightful portrait in question. I never saw it but once since I did it & it filled me with horror & remorse. If there is any survivor of the scores of painters who were friends of mine in New York some fifty years ago, he will oblige me by taking the said painting & giving it a good glaze of ivory black, wiping out a spot somewhere & thus converting it into a Whistler. I was a boy in my twenties when I did it & had never painted a head before. I hope I may be forgiven".

The self-portrait, too, survives, in the academy's collection. Waterman turned to Orientalist subjects after his visits to Algiers, and his paintings in this arena have been described as "rather literary"; many of them depict scenes from The Arabian Nights, while others are based on landscape studies made during his travels in Oram, Algiers, Andalusia, and the Sahel. It was already noted during his career that his paintings, though praised by critics, were out of step with trends in the contemporary artistic scene; within three years of his death his work was described as "old-fashioned" when it was shown in Boston. Even so, at his death he was remembered by A. J. Philpot as "the greatest colorist this country has produced, and far and away the greatest painter of light."

Besides the National Academy, museums which include work by Waterman in their collections include the Museum of Fine Arts, Boston, the Addison Gallery of American Art, the Worcester Art Museum, the Pilgrim Monument and Provincetown Museum, the Boston Public Library, and the Indiana University Art Museum.

== See also ==
- List of Orientalist artists
- Orientalism
