= The War Illustrated =

British magazine during World War I and World War II

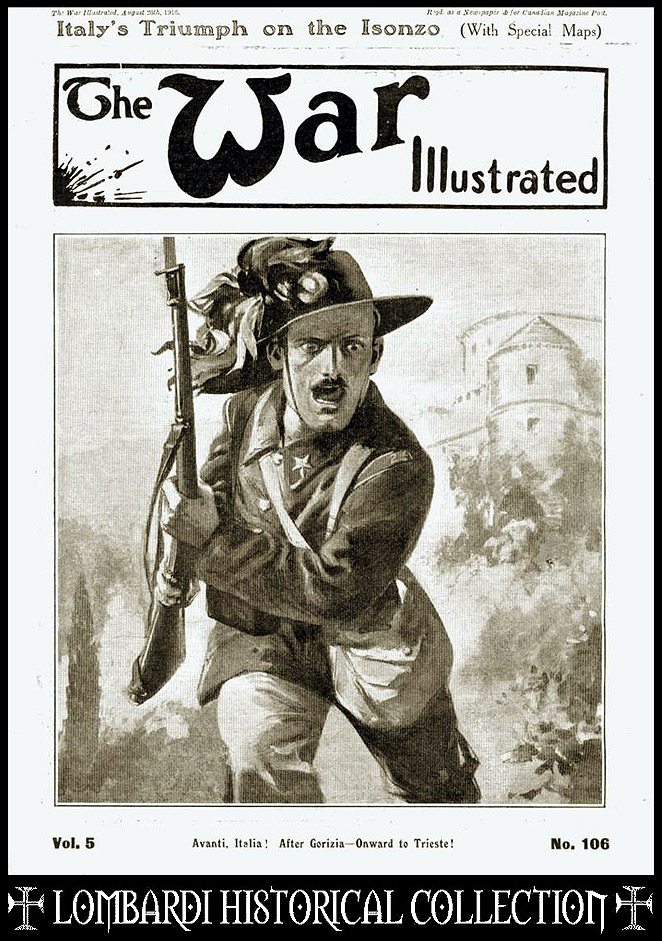
- Cover featuring an Italian Bersagliere (August 26, 1916, Vol 5 Issue 106)
- Editor: John Hammerton
- First issue: World War I: August 22, 1914; World War II: September 16, 1939
- Final issue: February 8, 1919; World War II: April 11, 1947
- Country: United Kingdom
- Based in: London
- Language: English

The War Illustrated was a British war magazine published in London by William Berry (later Viscount Camrose and owner of The Daily Telegraph). It was first released on 22 August 1914, eighteen days after the United Kingdom declared war on Germany, and regular issues continued throughout the First World War.

The magazine was discontinued after the 8 February 1919 issue, but returned 16 September 1939 following the start of the Second World War. 255 issues were published throughout the Second World War before the magazine permanently ceased production on 11 April 1947.

== Background ==
The magazine offers a pictorial record of both World War I and World War II. It includes numerous maps, photographs and illustrations, and the work of war artists, weekly reporting, and editorials on the conduct, events, and consequences of global conflict.

Subtitled "A Pictorial Record of the Conflict of the Nations", The War Illustrated was initially sensationalistic and patriotic. Although it contained articles, the main focus was on photographs and illustrations, most notably those of Stanley Wood dramatising (or in some cases fabricating) events involving German troops. The magazine became more diligent in properly verifying its reports from 1916 onwards.

Both versions of The War Illustrated were edited by John Hammerton, who also contributed articles throughout the magazine's run. The magazine contained personal accounts of the war by war correspondents such as Hamilton Fyfe and Luigi Barzini, Sr., descriptions and illustrations of Victoria Cross actions (for example those of John Lynn and John George Smyth) and articles by authors such as H. G. Wells ("Why Britain Went To War", "Will The War Change England?") and Winston Churchill ("The Right View of Verdun"). It was extremely popular: at its peak at the end of World War I, The War Illustrated had a circulation of 750,000.

== Contributors ==
- Stanley Llewellyn Wood (1866–1928), illustrator of many covers of the World War I editions. Most bound editions omitted the cover-pages.
- Paul Nash (1889–1946), artist and photographer
- Julien Bryan (1899–1974), American photographer
- H. G. Wells (1866–1946), English writer
- Sidney Low (1857–1932), British journalist and historian
- Jerome K. Jerome (1859–1927), English writer and humourist
- Fred T. Jane (1865–1916), English writer, wargamer, illustrator, founder of Janes Fighting Ships, an annual reference work
- Philip Gibbs (1877–1962), English journalist
- Ellis Ashmead-Bartlett (1881–1931), English war correspondent during World War I
- Ernest Brooks (1876–1957), British photographer, known for his war photography from World War I

== Illustrations ==
World War I

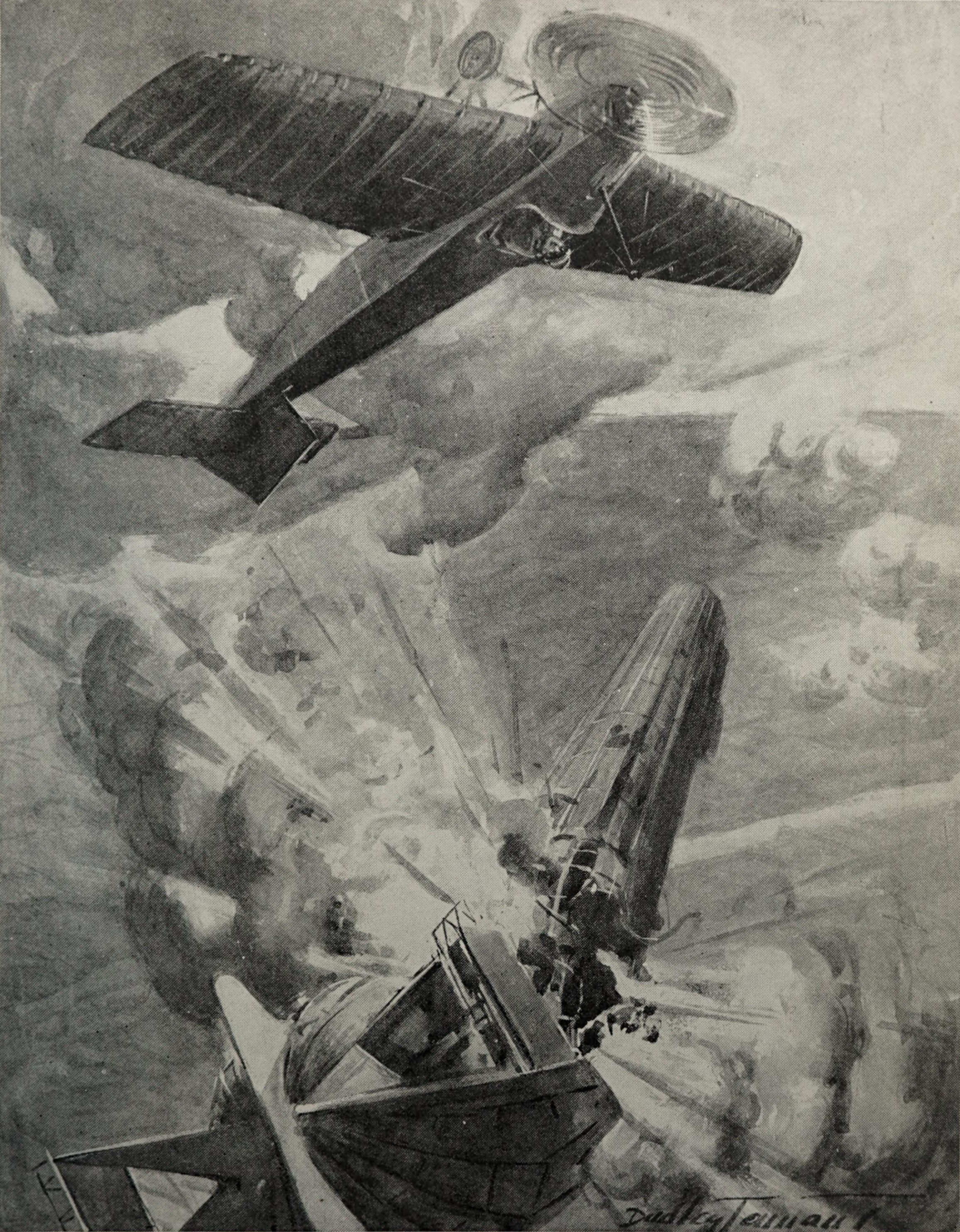
An artist's impression of the destruction of German Zeppelin LZ 37 by Sub-Lieutenant Rex Warneford on 7 June 1915

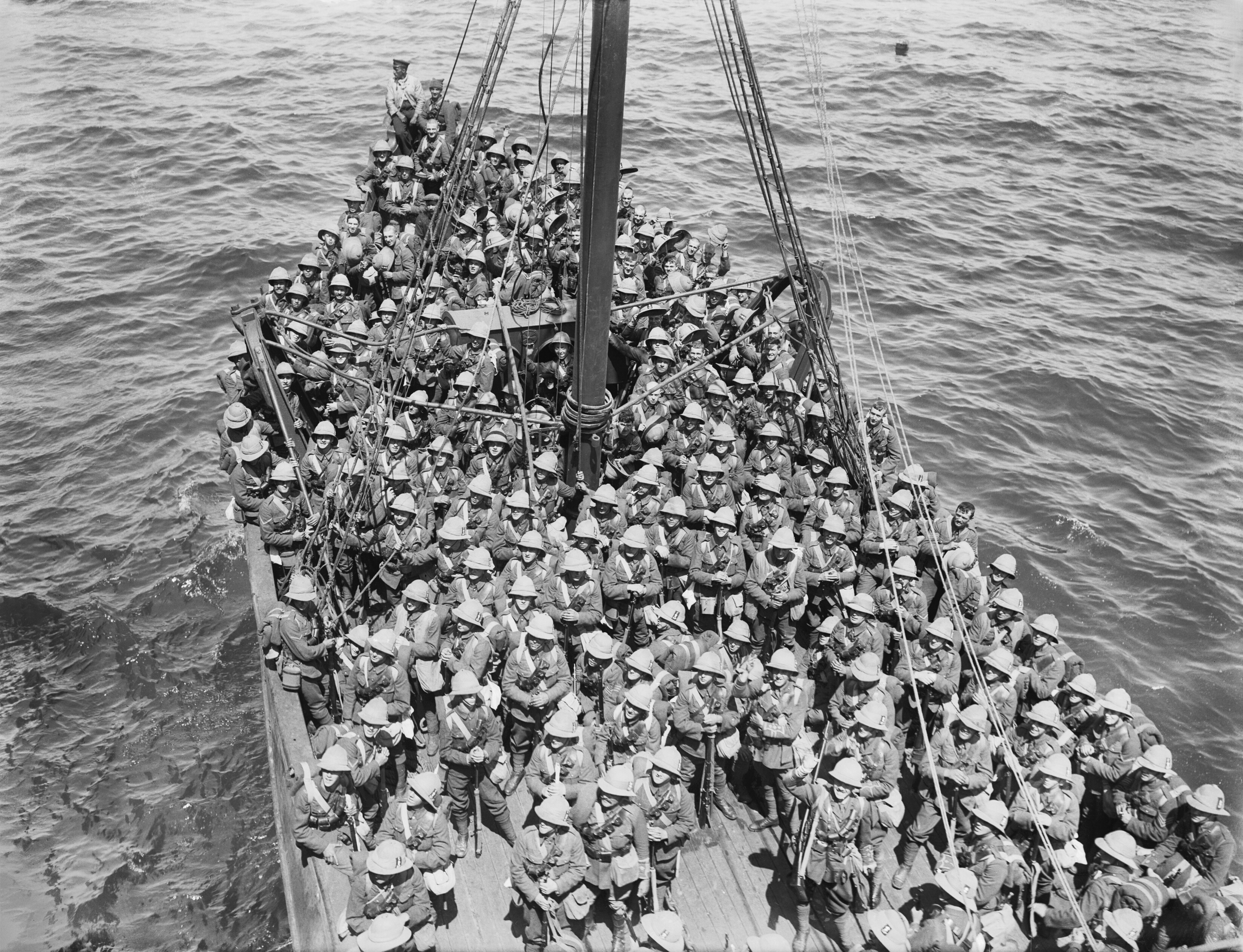
Photo by Ernest Brooks (Note: The caption credits Ellis Ashmead-Bartlett as the photographer, perhaps referring to one of the other 2 photos on the page. The Imperial War Museum, however, credits Ernest Brooks) – viewing from the deck of the Transport SS Nile – of the Lancashire Fusiliers aboard the Trawler 318 used in the Dardanelles landings, before disembarking at 'W' and 'V' beaches off Cape Helles on May 5, 1915

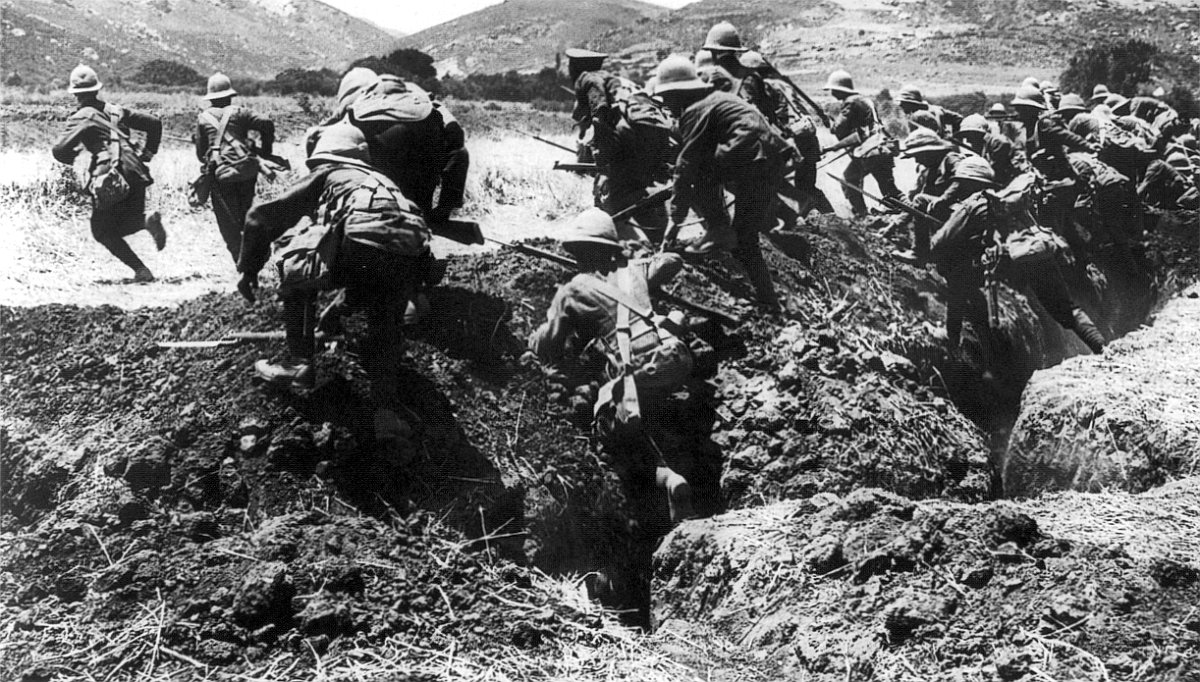
Photo by Ernest Brooks of the Infantry from the Royal Naval Division in training on the Greek island of Lemnos during the Battle of Gallipoli, 1915

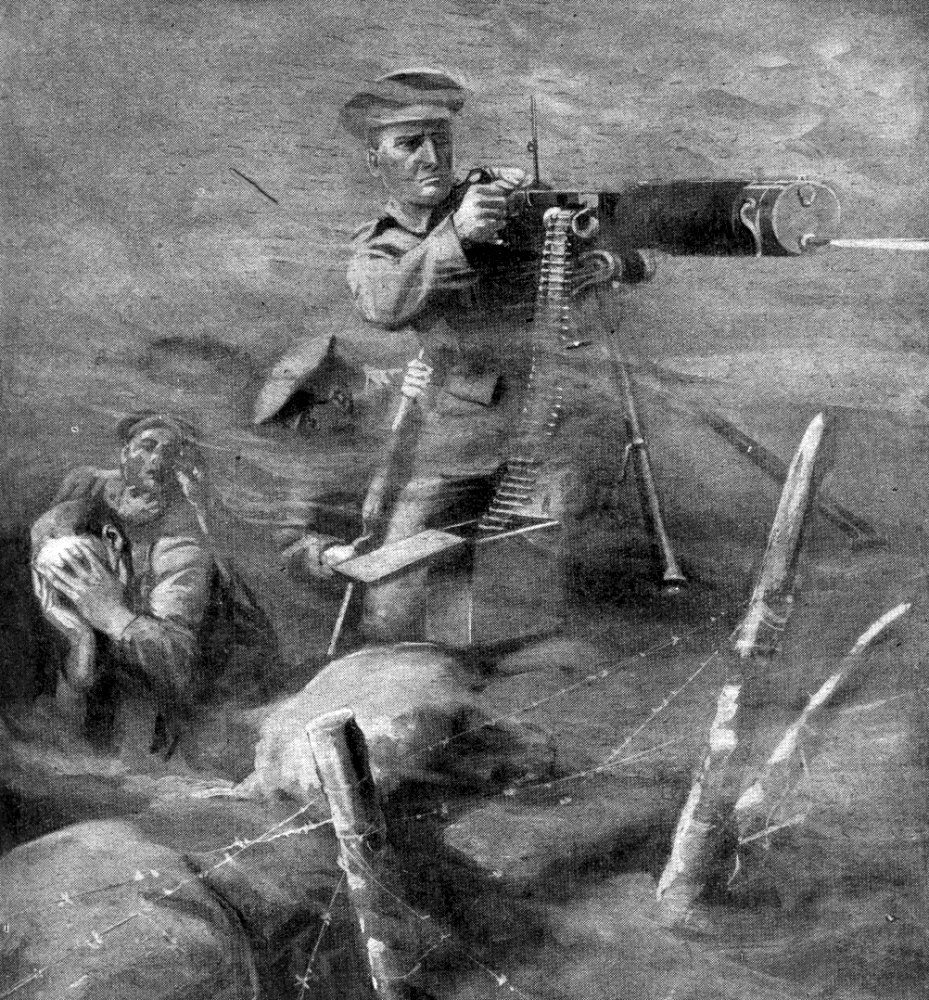
Illustration of the action in which Private John Lynn earned the Victoria Cross

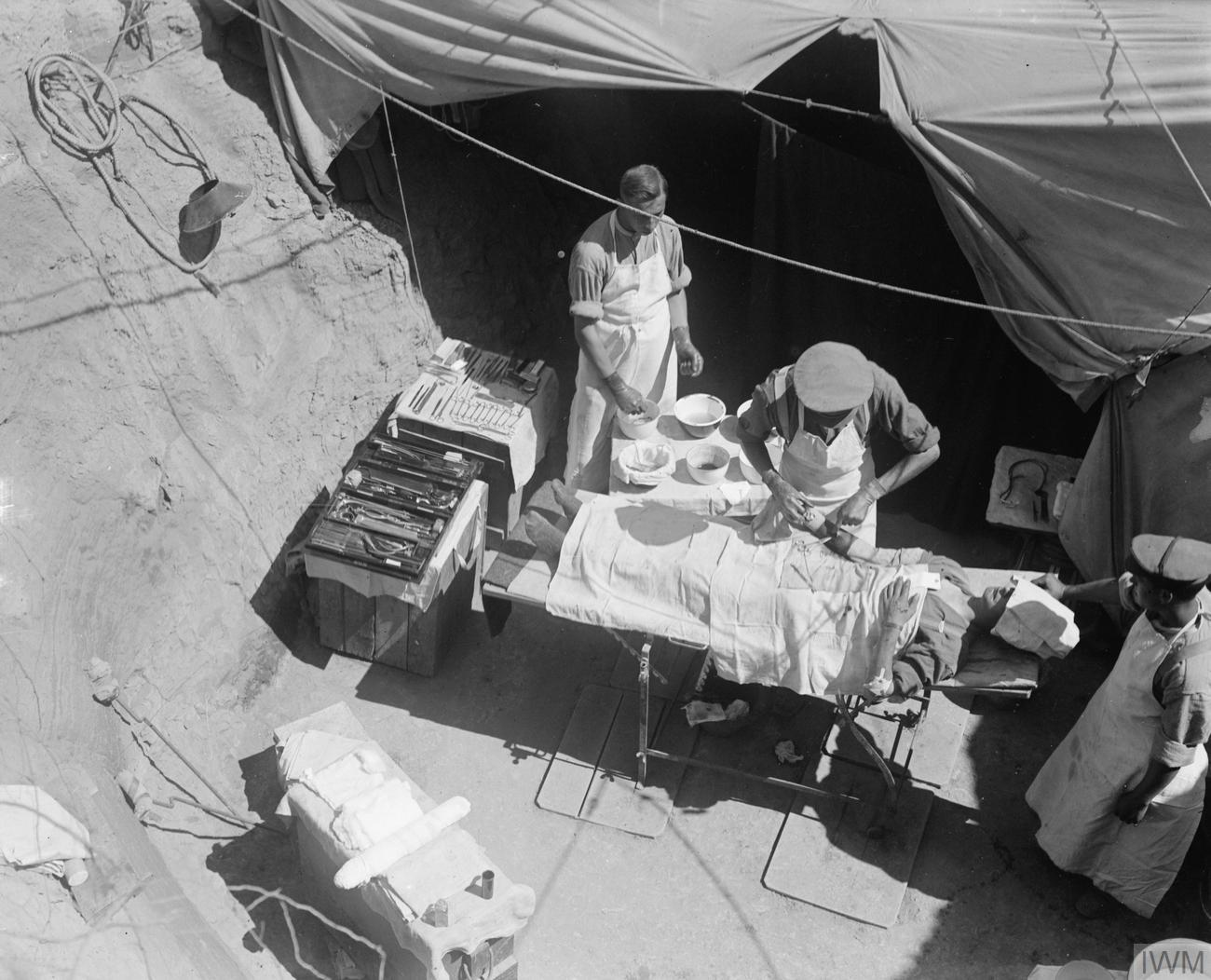
Photo by Ernest Brooks of a surgeon removing a bullet from a soldier's arm in a field-ambulance tent of the East Lancs Territorials at Cape Helles, Gallipoli, in 1915

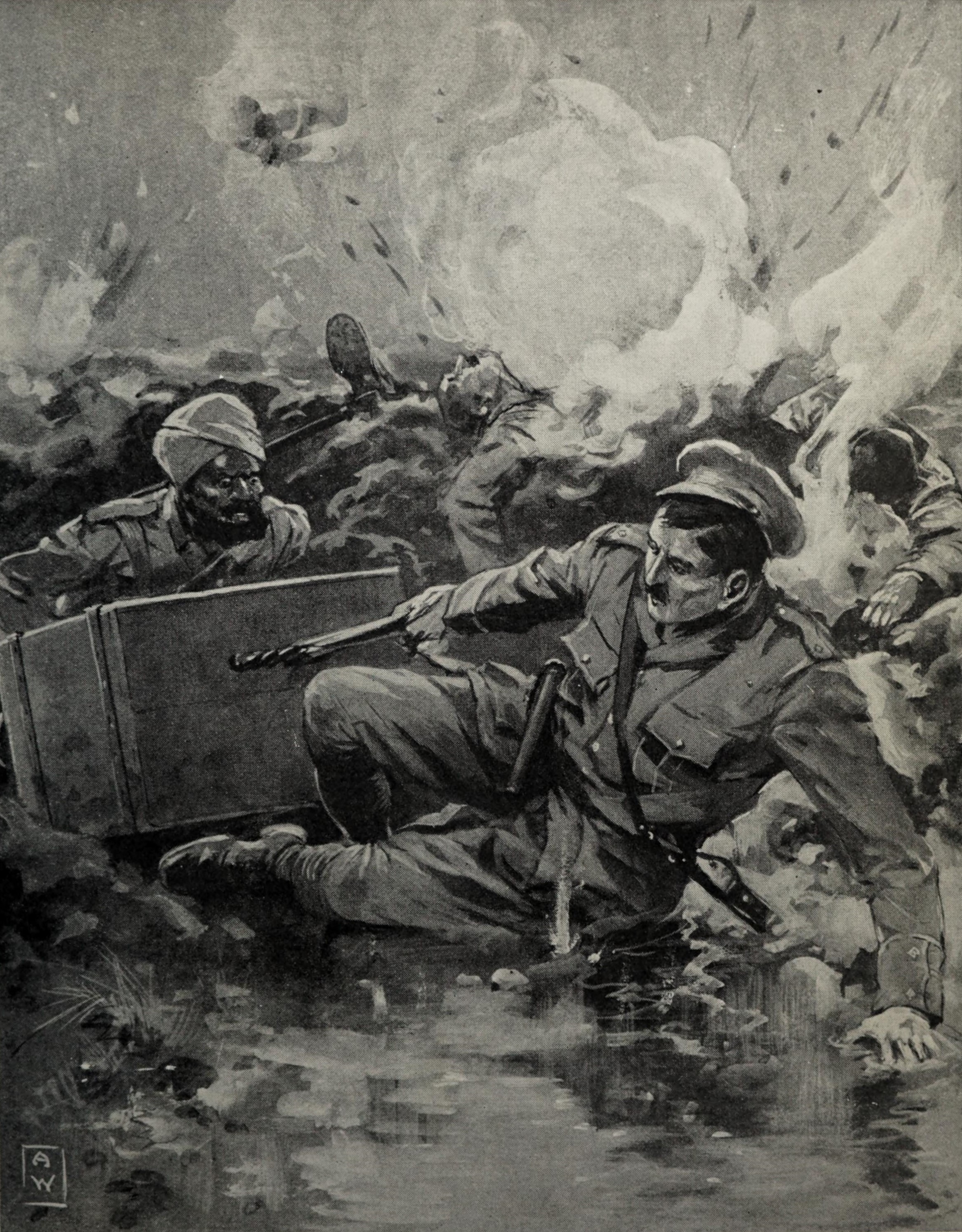
Drawing of Lieutenant John Smyth at the time he earned the Victoria Cross

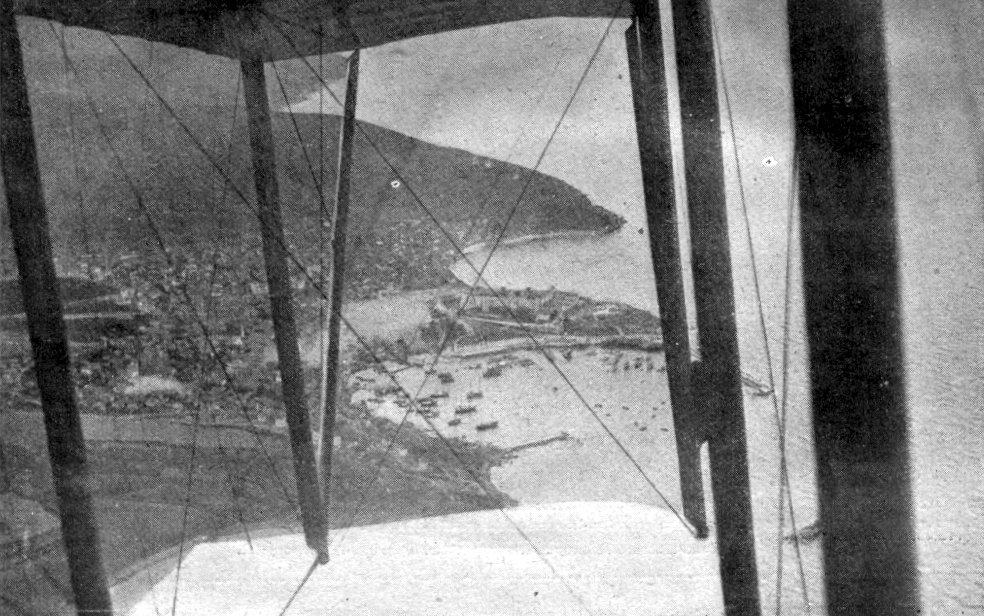
Aerial view of Dardanelles

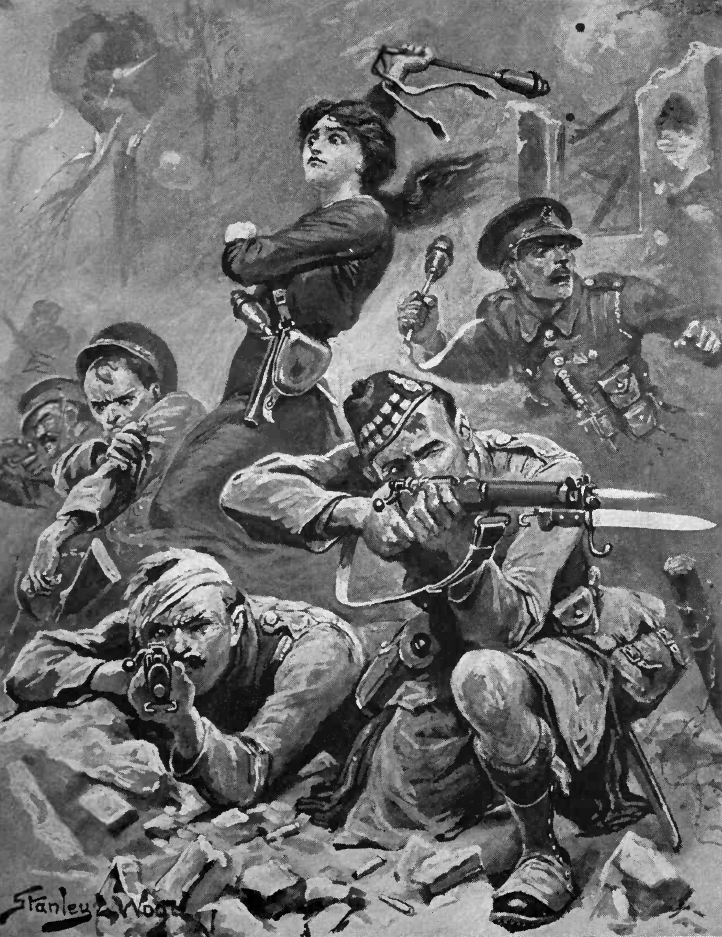
Émilienne Moreau-Evrard fighting alongside Scottish soldiers, illustrated by Stanley L. Wood

== Digitized copies online ==
=== World War I ===
Bound magazine copies

- Vol. 1; Issues 1 – Vol. 1, Issue 19 (August 22, 1914 – December 26, 1914). 1914.
- Vol. 1; Issues 20 – Vol. 2, Issue 45 (January 2, 1915 – June 26, 1915). 1915.
- Vol. 2; Issues 46 – Vol. 3, Issue 71 (July 3, 1915 – December 25, 1915). 1915.
- Vol. 3, Issue 72 – Vol. 4, Issue 97 (January 1, 1916 – June 24, 1916). 1916.
- Vol. 4, Issue 98 – Vol. 5, Issue 124 (July 1, 1916 – December 30, 1916). 1916.
- Vol. 5, Issue 125 – Vol. 6, Issue 150 (January 5, 1917 – June 30, 1917). 1917.
- Vol. 6, Issue 151 – Vol. 7, Issue 176 (July 7, 1917 – December 29, 1917). 1917.
- Vol. 7, Issue 177 – Vol. 8, Issue 202 (January 5, 1918 – June 29, 1918). 1918.
- Vol. 8, Issue 203 – Vol. 9, Issue 228 (July 6, 1918 – December 28, 1918). 1918.
- Vol. 9, Issue 229 – Vol. 9, Issue 234 (January 4, 1919 – February 8, 1919). 1919.

Republished, bound in volumes

- Hammerton, Sir John Alexander, ed. (1915–1919). The War Illustrated Album de Luxe; The Story of the Great European War Told by Camera, Pen and Pencil. The Amalgamated Press, Limited. LCCN 15-23051, LCCN 44-45155; OCLC 6460128 (all editions).
  - "The First Phase". The War Illustrated Album de Luxe. Vol. 1. 1915.
  - "The Winter Campaign, 1914–15". The War Illustrated Album de Luxe. Vol. 2. 1915.
  - "The Spring Campaign, 1915". The War Illustrated Album de Luxe. Vol. 3. 1915.
  - "The Summer Campaign, 1915". The War Illustrated Album de Luxe. Vol. 4. 1916.
  - "The Second Winter Campaign, 1915–16". The War Illustrated Album de Luxe. Vol. 5. 1916.
  - "Spring and Summer Campaign of 1916". The War Illustrated Album de Luxe. Vol. 6. 1916.<
  - "The Autumn Campaign of 1916". The War Illustrated Album de Luxe. Vol. 7. 1917.
  - "Ending the First Three Years". The War Illustrated Album de Luxe. Vol. 8. 1917.
  - "The Fourth Year, 1917–18". The War Illustrated Album de Luxe. Vol. 9. 1918.
  - "The Last Phase". The War Illustrated Album de Luxe. Vol. 10. 1919.

=== World War II ===
Cover of first issue of Second World War

Reprinted in 2000 by Trident Press International, LCCN 2002-511310 (bound vols.); OCLC 220168380 (all editions).

- Vol 1 (No. 1). September 16, 1939.
- Vol 1 (No. 2). September 23, 1939.
- Vol 1 (No. 3). September 30, 1939.
- Vol 1 (No. 4). October 7, 1939.
- Vol 1 (No. 5). October 14, 1939.
- Vol 1 (No. 6). October 21, 1939.
- Vol 1 (No. 7). October 28, 1939.
- Vol 1 (No. 8). November 4, 1939.
- Vol 1 (No. 9). November 11, 1939.
- Vol 1 (No. 10). November 18, 1939.
- Vol 1 (No. 11). November 25, 1939.
- Vol 1 (No. 12). December 2, 1939.
- Vol 1 (No. 13). December 9, 1939.
- Vol 1 (No. 14). December 16, 1939.
- Vol 1 (No. 15). December 18, 1939.
- Vol 1 (No. 16). December 23, 1939.
- Vol 1 (No. 17). December 29, 1939.
- Vol 1 (No. 18). January 5, 1940.
- Vol 1 (No. 19). January 12, 1940.
- Vol 1 (No. 20). January 19, 1940.
- General Index to Volume One. 1–20 (September 16, 1939 – January 19, 1940). 2000. ISBN 1582791007 (Vol. 1)

General Index to Volume Two. Issues 21–44 (January 26, 1940 – July 5, 1940). 2000. ISBN 1582791015 (Vol. 2)

- Vol 2 (No. 21). January 26, 1940.
- Vol 2 (No. 22). February 2, 1940.
- Vol 2 (No. 23). February 9, 1940.
- Vol 2 (No. 24). February 16, 1940.
- Vol 2 (No. 25). February 23, 1940.
- Vol 2 (No. 26). March 1, 1940.
- Vol 2 (No. 27). March 8, 1940.
- Vol 2 (No. 28). March 15, 1940.
- Vol 2 (No. 29). March 22, 1940.
- Vol 2 (No. 30). March 29, 1940.
- Vol 2 (No. 31). April 4, 1940.
- Vol 2 (No. 32). April 12, 1940.
- Vol 2 (No. 33). April 19, 1940.
- Vol 2 (No. 34). April 26, 1940.
- Vol 2 (No. 35). May 3, 1940.
- Vol 2 (No. 36). May 10, 1940.
- Vol 2 (No. 37). May 17, 1940.
- Vol 2 (No. 38). May 24, 1940.
- Vol 2 (No. 39). May 31, 1940.
- Vol 2 (No. 40). June 7, 1940.
- Vol 2 (No. 41). June 14, 1940.
- Vol 2 (No. 42). June 21, 1940.
- Vol 2 (No. 43). June 28, 1940.
- Vol 2 (No. 44). July 5, 1940.

Vol. 3: "Under Siege" ("Index"). Issues 45–70 (July 12, 1940 – January 3, 1941). 2000. ISBN 1582791023 (Vol. 3)

- Vol 3 (No. 45). July 12, 1940.
- Vol 3 (No. 46). July 19, 1940.
- Vol 3 (No. 47). July 26, 1940.
- Vol 3 (No. 48). August 2, 1940.
- Vol 3 (No. 49). August 9, 1940.
- Vol 3 (No. 50). August 16, 1940.
- Vol 3 (No. 51). August 23, 1940.
- Vol 3 (No. 52). August 30, 1940.
- Vol 3 (No. 53). September 6, 1940.
- Vol 3 (No. 54). September 13, 1940.
- Vol 3 (No. 55). September 20, 1940.
- Vol 3 (No. 56). September 27, 1940.
- Vol 3 (No. 57). October 4, 1940.
- Vol 3 (No. 58). October 11, 1940.
- Vol 3 (No. 59). October 18, 1940.
- Vol 3 (No. 60). October 25, 1940.
- Vol 3 (No. 61). November 1, 1940.
- Vol 3 (No. 62). November 8, 1940.
- Vol 3 (No. 63). November 15, 1940.
- Vol 3 (No. 64). November 22, 1940.
- Vol 3 (No. 65). November 29, 1940.
- Vol 3 (No. 66). December 6, 1940.
- Vol 3 (No. 67). December 13, 1940.
- Vol 3 (No. 68). December 20, 1940.
- Vol 3 (No. 69). December 27, 1940.
- Vol 3 (No. 70). January 3, 1941.

Vol. 4: "Sands of Blood" ("Index"). Issues 71–100 (January 10, 1941 – August 1, 1941). 2000. ISBN 1582791031 (Vol. 4)

- Vol 4 (No. 71). January 10, 1941.
- Vol 4 (No. 72). January 17, 1941.
- Vol 4 (No. 73). January 24, 1941.
- Vol 4 (No. 74). January 31, 1941.
- Vol 4 (No. 75). February 7, 1941.
- Vol 4 (No. 76). February 14, 1941.
- Vol 4 (No. 77). February 21, 1941.
- Vol 4 (No. 78). February 28, 1941.
- Vol 4 (No. 79). March 7, 1941.
- Vol 4 (No. 80). March 14, 1941.
- Vol 4 (No. 81). March 21, 1941.
- Vol 4 (No. 82). March 28, 1941.
- Vol 4 (No. 83). April 4, 1941.
- Vol 4 (No. 84). April 10, 1941.
- Vol 4 (No. 85). April 18, 1941.
- Vol 4 (No. 86). April 25, 1941.
- Vol 4 (No. 87). May 2, 1941.
- Vol 4 (No. 88). May 9, 1941.
- Vol 4 (No. 89). May 16, 1941.
- Vol 4 (No. 90). May 23, 1941.
- Vol 4 (No. 91). May 30, 1941.
- Vol 4 (No. 92). June 6, 1941.
- Vol 4 (No. 93). June 13, 1941.
- Vol 4 (No. 94). June 20, 1941.
- Vol 4 (No. 95). June 27, 1941.
- Vol 4 (No. 96). July 4, 1941.
- Vol 4 (No. 97). July 11, 1941.
- Vol 4 (No. 98). July 18, 1941.
- Vol 4 (No. 99). July 25, 1941.
- Vol 4 (No. 100). August 1, 1941.

Vol. 5: "Japan Attacks" ("Index"). Issues 101–130 (August 8, 1941 – June 12, 1942). 2000. ISBN 158279104X (Vol. 5).

- Vol 5 (101). August 8, 1941.
- Vol 5 (102). August 15, 1941.
- Vol 5 (103). August 22, 1941.
- Vol 5 (104). August 29, 1941.

- Vol 5 (105). September 10, 1941.
- Vol 5 (106). September 20, 1941.
- Vol 5 (107). September 30, 1941.
- Vol 5 (108). October 10, 1941.
- Vol 5 (109). October 20, 1941.
- Vol 5 (110). October 30, 1941.
- Vol 5 (111). November 10, 1941.
- Vol 5 (112). November 20, 1941.
- Vol 5 (113). November 29, 1941.
- Vol 5 (114). December 10, 1941.
- Vol 5 (115). December 20, 1941.
- Vol 5 (116). December 30, 1941.
- Vol 5 (117). January 10, 1942.
- Vol 5 (118). January 20, 1942.
- Vol 5 (119). January 30, 1942.
- Vol 5 (120). February 10, 1942.
- Vol 5 (121). February 20, 1942.
- Vol 5 (122). February 28, 1942.

- Vol 5 (123). March 3, 1942.
- Vol 5 (124). March 20, 1942.
- Vol 5 (125). April 2, 1942.
- Vol 5 (126). April 17, 1942.
- Vol 5 (127). May 1, 1942.
- Vol 5 (128). May 15, 1942.
- Vol 5 (129). May 29, 1942.
- Vol 5 (130). June 12, 1942.
Vol. 6: Axis Domination" (full volume). Issues 131–155 (June 26, 1942 – May 28, 1943). 2000. ISBN 1582791058 (Vol. 6).
Vol. 6: Axis Domination" ("Index").
- Vol 6 (131). June 26, 1942.
- Vol 6 (132). July 10, 1942.
- Vol 6 (133). July 24, 1942.
- Vol 6 (134). August 7, 1942.
- Vol 6 (135). August 21, 1942.
- Vol 6 (136). September 4, 1942.
- Vol 6 (137). September 18, 1942.
- Vol 6 (138). October 2, 1942.
- Vol 6 (139). October 16, 1942.
- Vol 6 (140). October 30, 1942.
- Vol 6 (141). November 13, 1942.
- Vol 6 (142). November 27, 1942.
- Vol 6 (143). December 11, 1942.
- Vol 6 (144). December 26, 1942.
- Vol 6 (145). January 8, 1943.
- Vol 6 (146). January 22, 1943.
- Vol 6 (147). February 5, 1943.
- Vol 6 (148). February 19, 1943.
- Vol 6 (149). March 5, 1943.
- Vol 6 (150). March 19, 1943.
- Vol 6 (151). April 2, 1943.
- Vol 6 (152). April 16, 1943.
- Vol 6 (153). April 30, 1943.
- Vol 6 (154). May 14, 1943.
- Vol 6 (155). May 28, 1943.
Vol. 7: "Scorched Earth" ("Index"). Issues 156–180 (June 11, 1943 – May 12, 1944). 2000. ISBN 1582791066 (Vol. 7).
- Vol 7 (156). June 11, 1943.
- Vol 7 (157). June 25, 1943.
- Vol 7 (158). July 9, 1943.
- Vol 7 (159). July 23, 1943.
- Vol 7 (160). August 6, 1943.
- Vol 7 (161). August 20, 1943.
- Vol 7 (162). September 3, 1943.
- Vol 7 (163). September 17, 1943.
- Vol 7 (164). October 1, 1943.
- Vol 7 (165). October 15, 1943.
- Vol 7 (166). October 23, 1943.
- Vol 7 (167). November 12, 1943.
- Vol 7 (168). November 26, 1943.
- Vol 7 (169). December 10, 1943.
- Vol 7 (170). December 24, 1943.
- Vol 7 (171). January 7, 1944.
- Vol 7 (172). January 21, 1944.
- Vol 7 (173). February 4, 1944.
- Vol 7 (174). February 18, 1944.
- Vol 6 (175). March 3, 1944.
- Vol 7 (176). March 17, 1944.
- Vol 7 (177). March 31, 1944.
- Vol 7 (178). April 14, 1944.
- Vol 7 (179). April 14, 1944.
- Vol 7 (180). May 12, 1944.
Vol. 8: "Invasion" ("Index"). Issues 181–205 (May 26, 1944 – April 27, 1945). 2000. ISBN 1582791074 (Vol. 8).
- Vol 8 (181). May 26, 1944.
- Vol 8 (182). June 9, 1944.
- Vol 8 (183). June 23, 1944.
- Vol 8 (184). July 7, 1944.
- Vol 8 (185). July 21, 1944.
- Vol 8 (186). August 4, 1944.
- Vol 8 (187). August 18, 1944.
- Vol 8 (188). September 1, 1944.
- Vol 8 (189). September 15, 1944.
- Vol 8 (190). September 29, 1944.
- Vol 8 (191). October 13, 1944.
- Vol 8 (192). October 27, 1944.
- Vol 8 (193). November 10, 1944.
- Vol 8 (194). November 24, 1944.
- Vol 8 (195). December 8, 1944.
- Vol 8 (196). December 22, 1944.
- Vol 8 (197). January 5, 1945.
- Vol 8 (198). January 19, 1945.
- Vol 8 (199). February 2, 1945.
- Vol 8 (200). February 16, 1945.
- Vol 8 (201). March 2, 1945.
- Vol 8 (202). March 16, 1945.
- Vol 8 (203). March 29, 1945.
- Vol 8 (204). April 13, 1945.
- Vol 8 (205). April 27, 1945.
Vol. 9: "Victory" (full volume). Issues 206–230 (May 11, 1945 – April 12, 1946). 2000. ISBN 1-5827-9108-2 (Vol. 9).
Vol. 9: "Victory" ("Index").
- Vol 9 (206). May 11, 1945.
- Vol 9 (207). May 25, 1945.
- Vol 9 (208). June 8, 1945.
- Vol 9 (209). June 22, 1945.
- Vol 9 (210). July 6, 1945.
- Vol 9 (211). July 20, 1945.
- Vol 9 (212). August 3, 1945.
- Vol 9 (213). August 17, 1945.
- Vol 9 (214). August 31, 1945.
- Vol 9 (215). September 14, 1945.
- Vol 9 (216). September 28, 1945.
- Vol 9 (217). October 12, 1945.
- Vol 9 (218). October 26, 1945.
- Vol 9 (219). November 9, 1945.
- Vol 9 (220). November 23, 1945.
- Vol 9 (221). December 7, 1945.
- Vol 9 (222). December 21, 1945.
- Vol 9 (223). January 4, 1946.
- Vol 9 (224). January 18, 1946.
- Vol 9 (225). February 1, 1946.
- Vol 9 (226). February 15, 1946.
- Vol 9 (227). March 1, 1946.
- Vol 9 (228). March 15, 1946.
- Vol 9 (229). March 29, 1946.
- Vol 9 (230). April 12, 1946.
Vol. 10: "Liberation & Beyond" ("Index"). Issues 231–255 (April 26, 1946 – April 11, 1947). 2000. ISBN 1582791090 (Vol. 10).
- 10 (231). April 26, 1946.
- 10 (232). May 10, 1946.
- 10 (233). May 24, 1946.
- 10 (234). June 7, 1946.
- 10 (235). June 21, 1946.
- 10 (236). July 5, 1946.
- 10 (237). July 19, 1946.
- 10 (238). August 2, 1946.
- 10 (239). August 16, 1946.
- 10 (240). August 30, 1946.
- 10 (241). September 13, 1946.
- 10 (242). September 27, 1946.
- 10 (243). October 11, 1946.
- 10 (244). October 25, 1946.
- 10 (245). November 8, 1946.
- 10 (246). November 22, 1946.
- 10 (247). December 6, 1946.
- 10 (248). December 20, 1946.
- 10 (249). January 3, 1947.
- 10 (250). January 17, 1947.
- 10 (251) (PDF). January 31, 1947.
- 10 (252) (PDF). February 14, 1947.
- 10 (253) (PDF). March 14, 1947.
- 10 (254) (PDF). March 28, 1947.
- 10 (255) (PDF). April 11, 1947.

== Bibliography ==
- Anthony "Tony" Langley. "The War Illustrated, a Pictorial Record of the Conflict of the Nations". The Great War in a Different Light. Archived from the original on July 14, 2006.
- "Scope of the Collections for British Military History, 1801–1945". British Library. Archived from the original on July 1, 2006 – via Wayback Machine.
- Wells, H.G. "Will the War Change England?" (February 20 & 27, 1915).

"Will the War Change England? Part1". The War Illustrated. Vol. 2, no. 27. February 20, 1915. pp. 2, 4. LCCN 44045155.
"Will the War Change England? Part 2". The War Illustrated. Vol. 2, no. 28. February 27, 1915. pp. 26, 28. LCCN 44045155.

Reprinted The War Illustrated Album de Luxe. Vol. 2: "The First Phase". 1915. pp. 608, 610–611, 613. LCCN 15023051 – via Internet Archive.

- Wells, H.G. (August 10, 1914). "Why Britain Went to War". The War Illustrated. Vol. 1, no. 1. London: The Amalgamated Press, Limited. p. 2. LCCN 44045155. OCLC 880596026.
