= Reningelst =

Coordinates: 50°49′N 2°45′E

- Deelgemeente
- Country: Belgium
- Province: West Flanders
- Municipality: Poperinge

Area
  - Total: 15.20 km^{2} (5.87 sq mi)

Population (2008)
  - Total: 1,405
  - Density: 92.4/km^{2} (239/sq mi)
- Source: NIS
- Postal code: 8970

Reningelst is a rural village in the Belgian province of West Flanders, and a "deelgemeente" of the municipality Poperinge. The village has about 1405 inhabitants.

The deelgemeente of De Klijte used to be a part of Reningelst (then independent, now part of Heuvelland). De Klijte split from Reningelst in 1976 and is now part of the Heuvelland municipality.

== Sports ==
Reningelst is host to several major cycling races each year. Reningelst calls itself a wielerdorp (cycling village). Every year during the kermisweek a number of major cycling races happen here. The Eight of Reningelst owes its name to an 8-shaped trail in and around the village.

== Sightseeing and cultural life ==
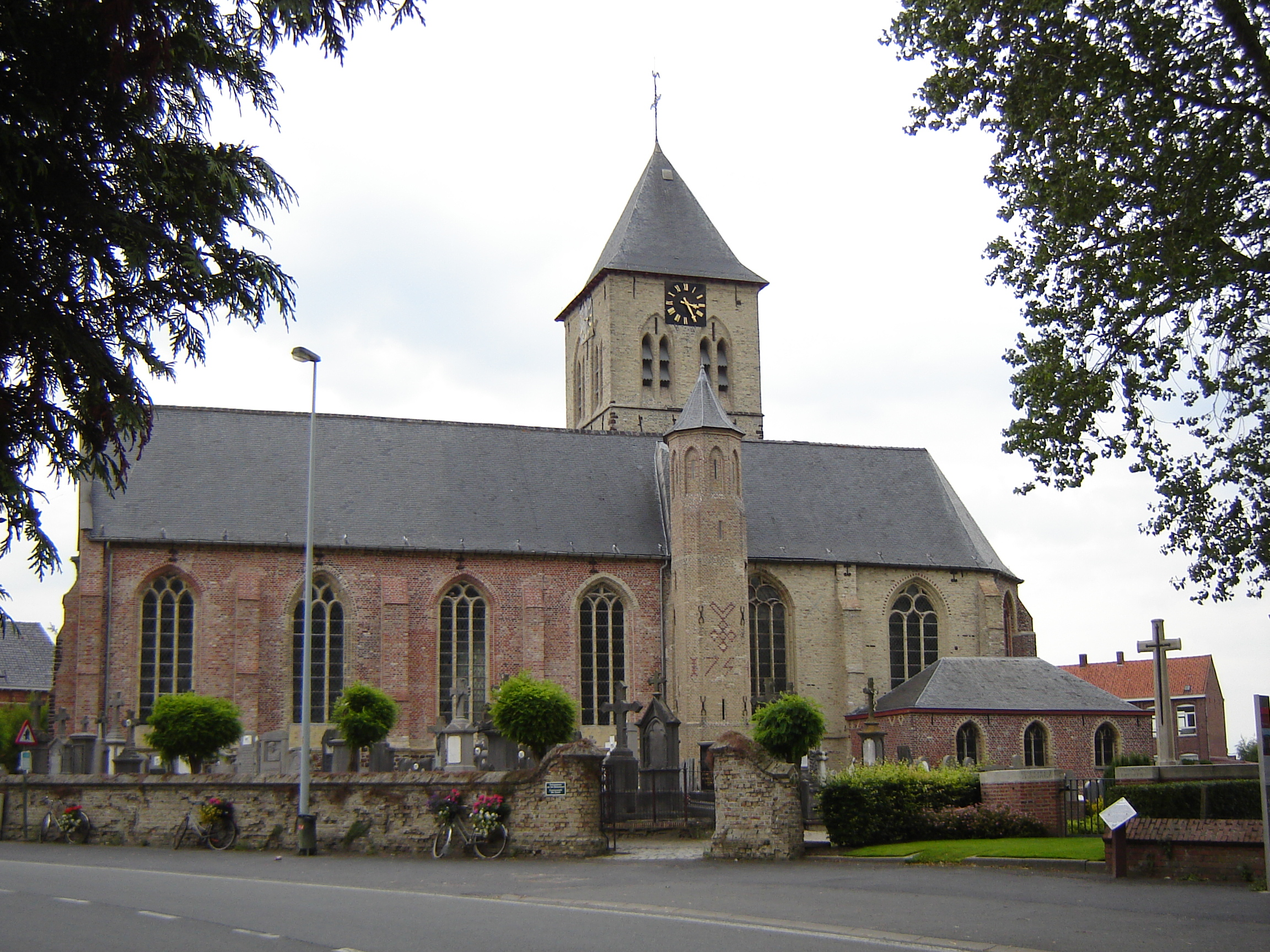
St. Vedastuskerk

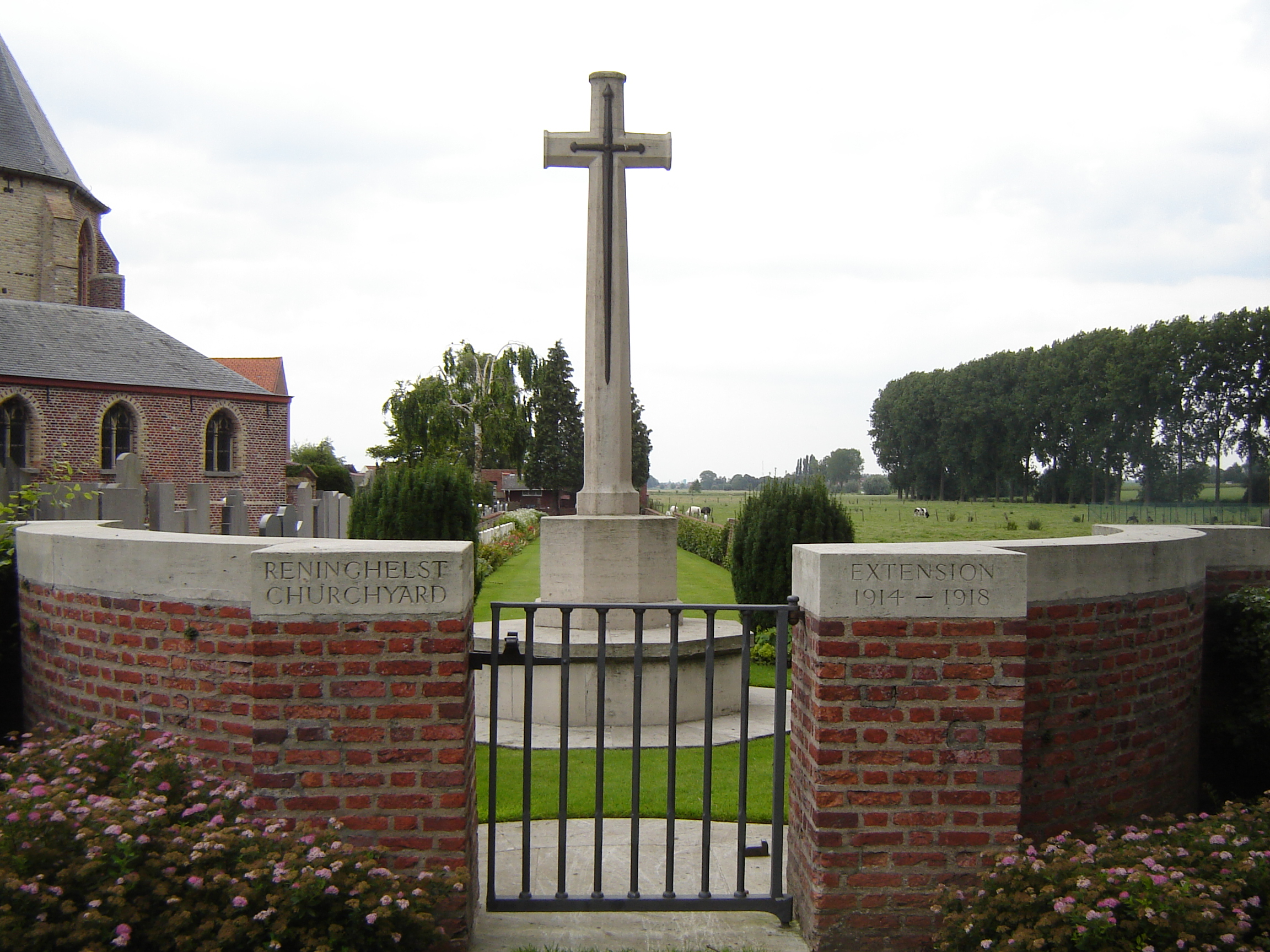
Reningelst Churchyard Extension. Commonwealth military cemetery next to the churchyard of the church of Saint Vedast in Reningelst.

Probably the most popular tourist site is the Catholic village church, the St. Vedastuskerk. In the year 1568 three priests of Reningelst were murdered here because of the religious persecution during that period. The church was burned down in 1623 by Ypres Geuzen and was rebuilt to it current, Gothic architecture circa 1623. However, it was again destroyed during the First World War (1914–1918) and again repaired. Although it was the town center during these perilous times, was never occupied by the German army. Today, still, much of the wooden interior of the church is of important historical value.

The village used to have a castle that was built around 1100. On September 6, 1793 the fortified castle was completely burnt down, on the orders of Napoleon's General Van Damme. A double railway was constructed where the castle stood (now a meadow) during the First World War. Reningelst was a stopover for many soldiers on their way to or from the front. After the war, several military cemeteries were built across the Westhoek, as well as in Reningelst. There is the Grootebeek British Cemetery, the Reninghelst Churchyard Cemetery next to the civil cemetery around the church. The Reninghelst New Military Cemetery includes those from the Chinese Labour Corps. There is also a Memorial for the military and civilian victims of World War I and World War II from Reningelst.

In the former village hall, the history of Reningelst appears on a stained-glass window.

Until the 1960s a brewery on the village square brewed Roökop (translated from Flemish: Red Head). The beer has now gone, but the brewery still stands (though part of it in ruins), now as the local cultural centre, also called Rookop. The Rookop cultural centre houses many local sports and hobby clubs. Local theatre groups sometimes play there. Since 2006 it is also the location for the annual "Troost van Schoonheid" (Comfort of Beauty) one-day music and poetry festival.

There are two bed-and-breakfasts in the village centre.

== Public services ==
The village currently has a primary school, spread over two locations: one in the Pastoorstraat, and one in the Baljuwstraat.

Reningelst also has a forward firefighter station, part of Firefighters Great Poperinge. The firefighter station is composed of 19 officers and troops.

== Notable people from Reningelst ==
- Piet Chielens was born in Reningelst in 1956. He is coordinator of the In Flanders Fields Museum in Ypres (Ieper).
