= Grootebeek British Cemetery =

CWGC cemetery in Belgium

- Commonwealth War Graves Commission
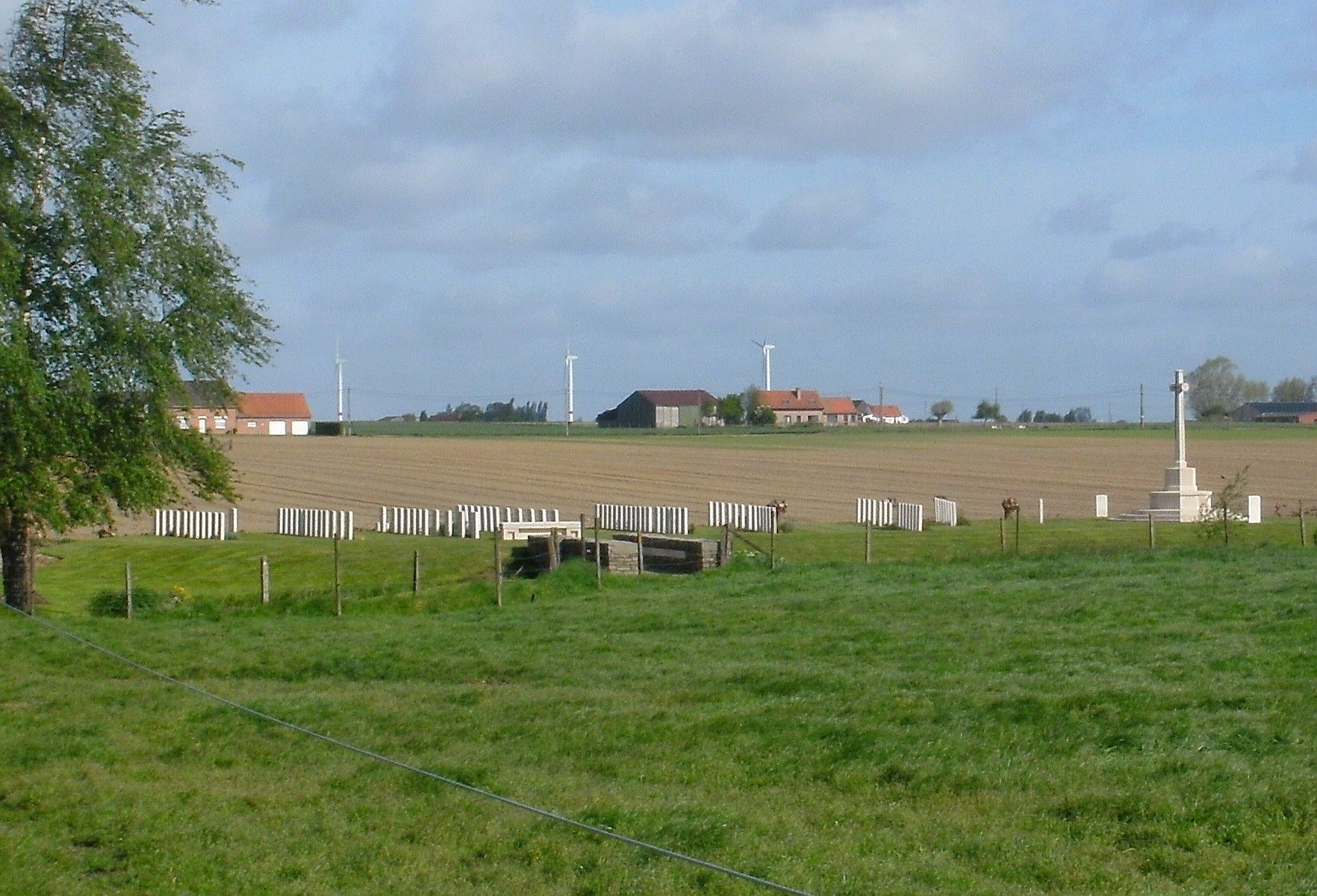
- Used for those deceased 1915-1918
- Established: April 1918
- Location: 50.8261°N 2.7822°E near Reningelst, West Flanders, Belgium
- Total burials: 111

Burials by war
- * World War I: 109 (Commonwealth): World War II: 2 (Commonwealth)

Grootebeek British Cemetery is a Commonwealth War Graves Commission (CWGC) burial ground for the dead of the Western Front of the First and Second World War. It is located near Reningelst in the municipality of Poperinge in western Belgium. The cemetery is surrounded by farmland and can only be reached via a 100-metre grassed path which is not suitable for vehicles.

== History ==
The war cemetery was established in April 1918 during the Battle of the Lys for use by British field ambulances and fighting units. The cemetery, located in a field near the hamlet of Ouderdom on the Poperinge-Wijtschate road, was originally called "Ouderdom Military Cemetery" but later renamed after the stream Grootebeek (or Groote Kemmelbeek) which runs beside it. The cemetery was designed by W.H. Cowlishaw.

=== First World War ===
The village of Reningelst was in Allied hands from the autumn of 1914 to the end of the First World War. The site near the hamlet of Ouderdom was used for burials of soldiers until the end of September 1918. It absorbed a number of earlier burials and memorials from the area. From March 1915, Commonwealth burials had been made in Reningelst Churchyard, the Reningelst Churchyard Extension and the Reningelst New Military Cemetery, and a small Indian cemetery had been created at the site of the present-day Grootebeek British Cemetery in April 1915.

=== Second World War ===
During the Second World War, the Grootebeek British Cemetery was used again. The two burials from this time date from May 1940 and the withdrawal of the British Expeditionary Force ahead of the German advance.

== Description ==
Grootebeek British Cemetery contains 109 Commonwealth burials and commemorations of the First World War. One grave destroyed by shell fire is now represented by a special memorial, and another special memorial records the name of Private John Lynn VC, DCM (1887–1915 †) who was buried in Vlamertinge Churchyard but whose grave was similarly destroyed by fighting. There is also a Cross of Sacrifice within the cemetery.

== Gallery ==
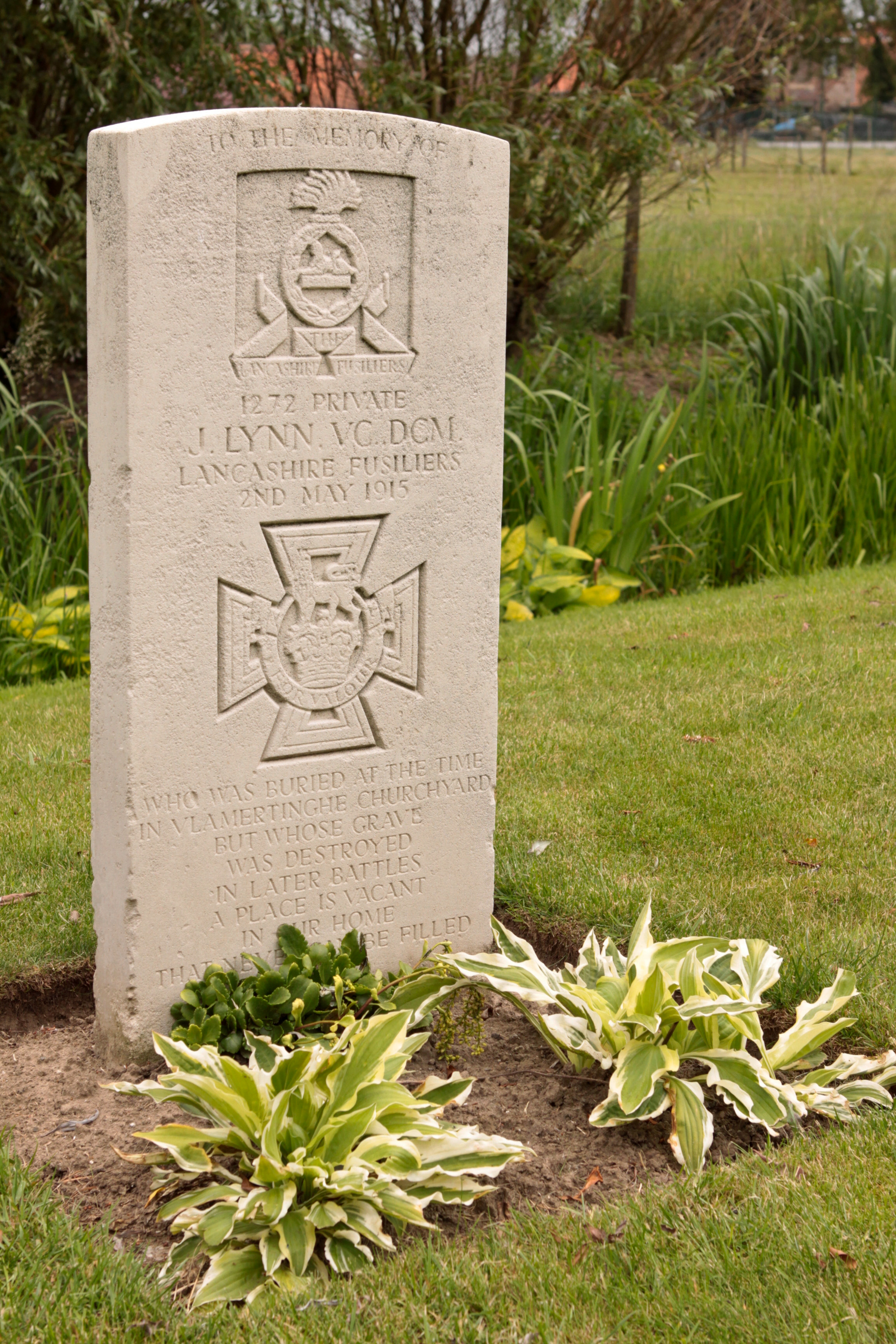
Private John Lynn VC

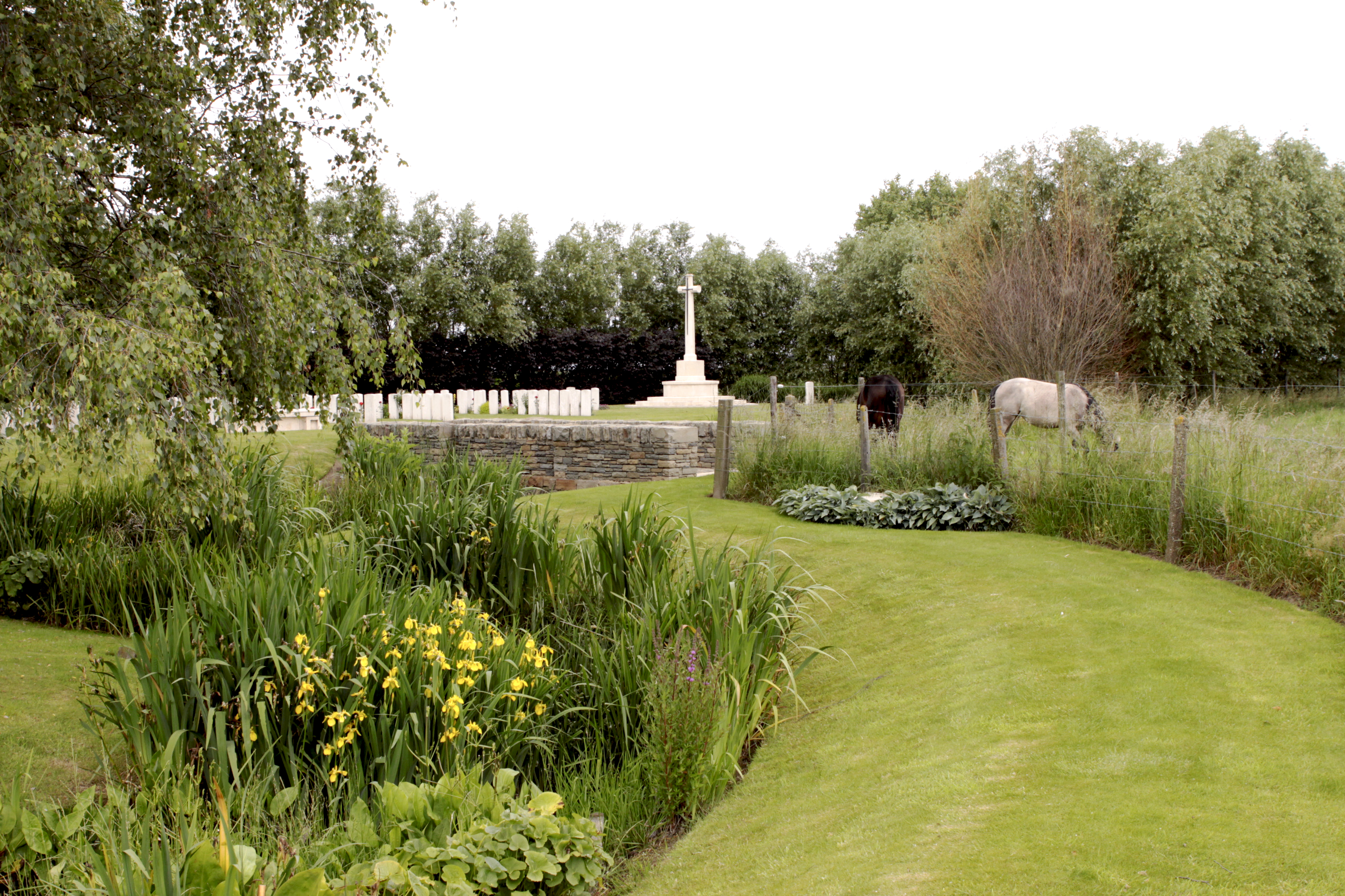
Cross of Sacrifice

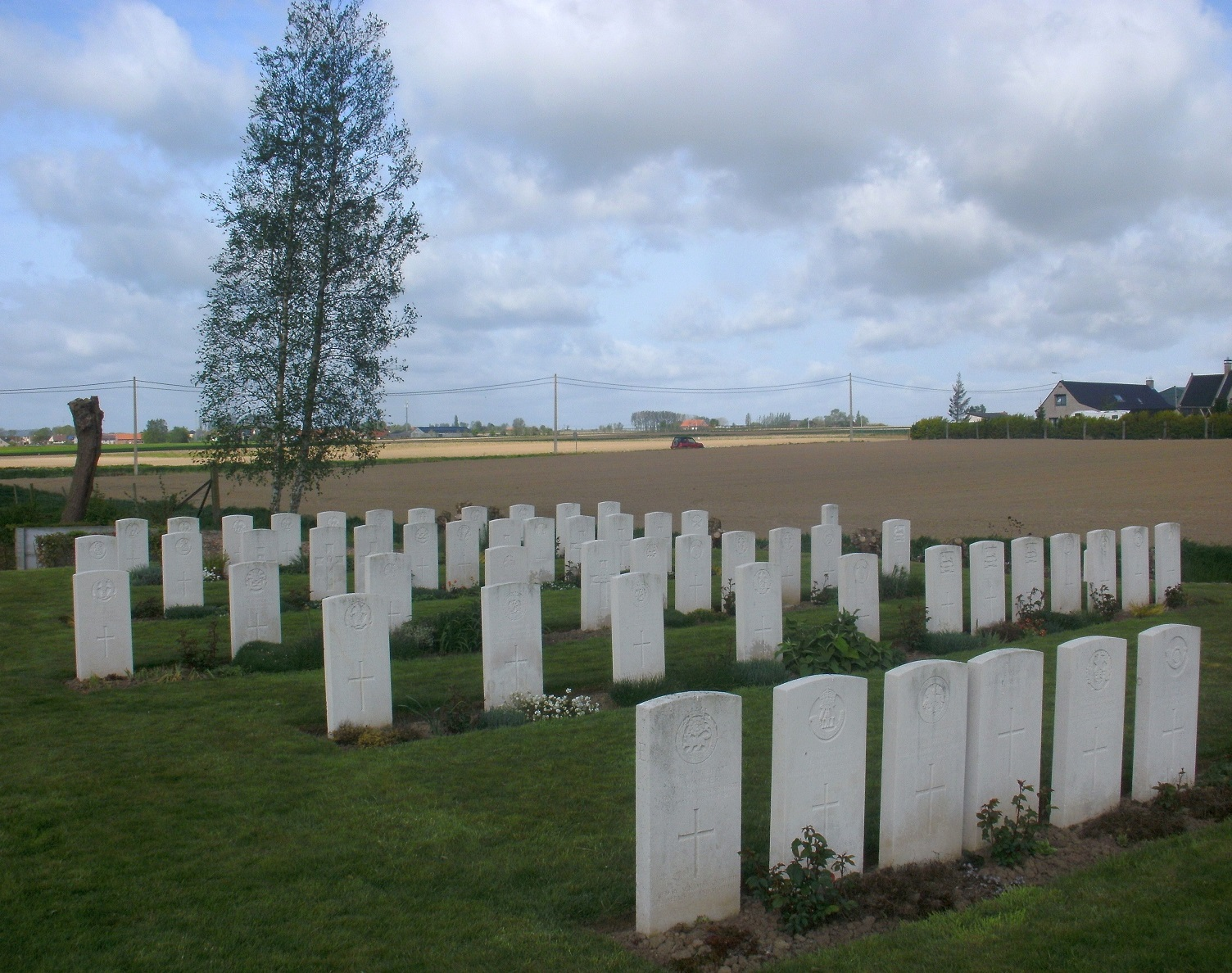

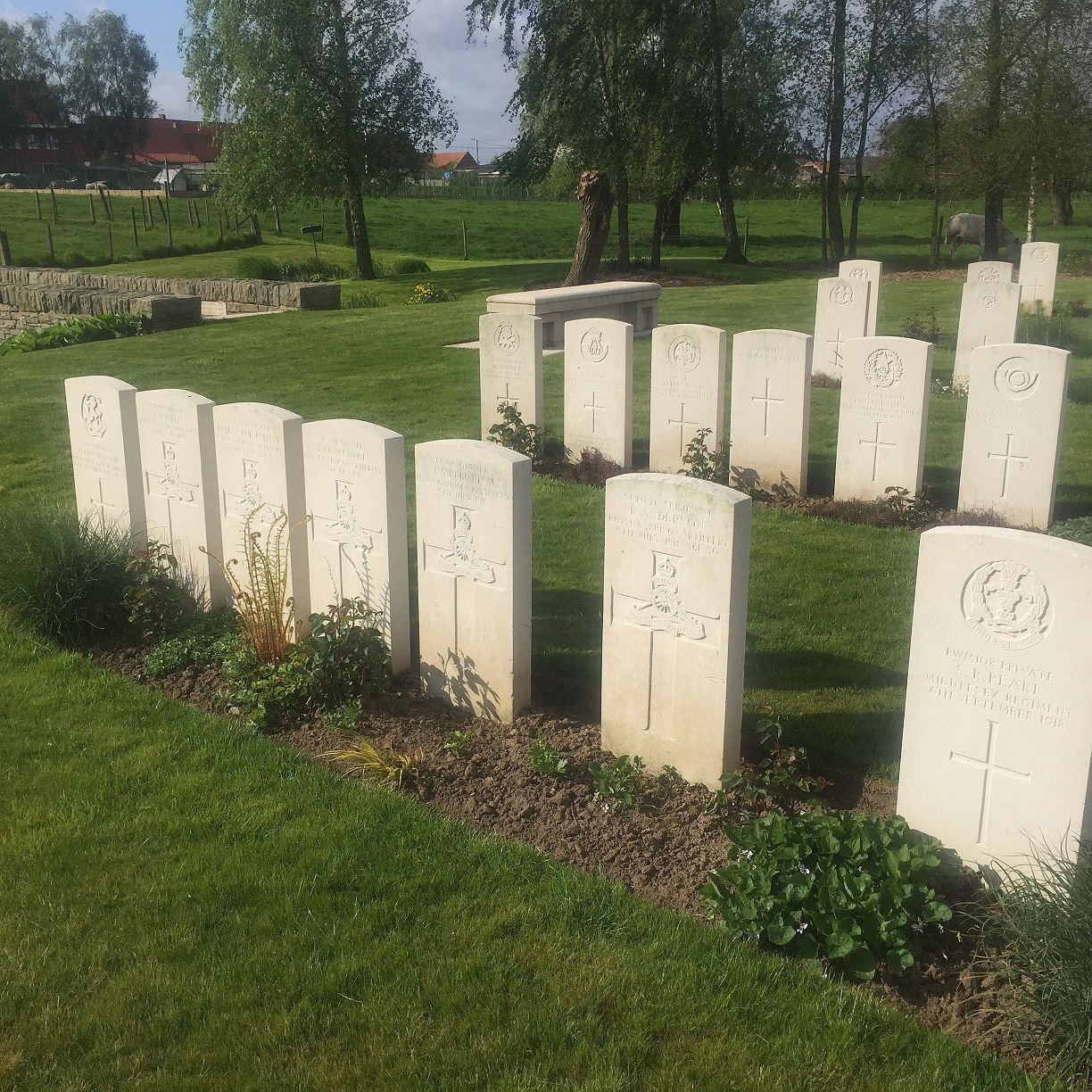

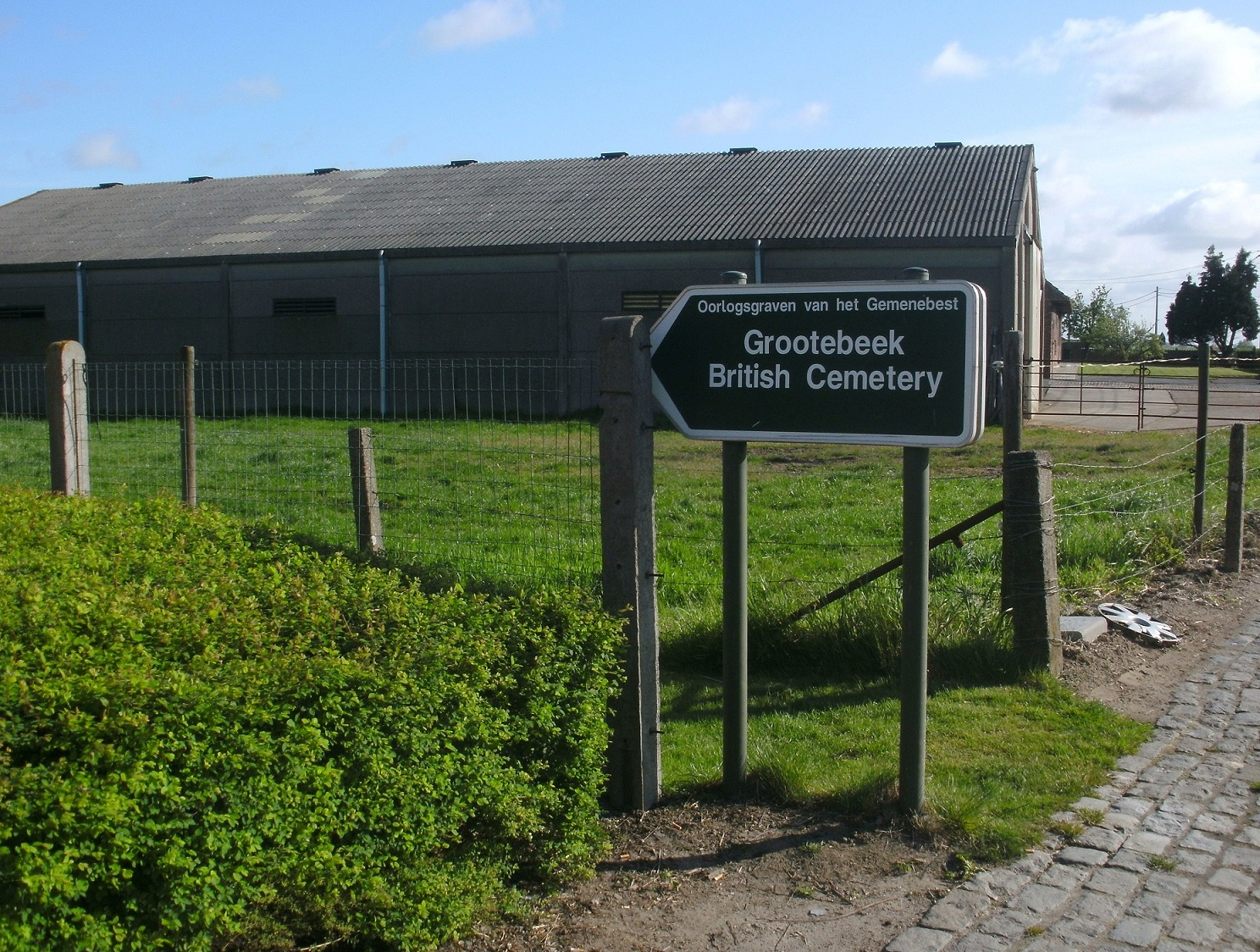
