= Piet Chielens =

Belgian writer and curator

Piet Chielens (born 1956) is a Belgian writer, translator and curator. He is coordinator of the In Flanders Fields Museum in Ypres (Ieper) in Belgium. He is also artistic director of Vredesconcerten Passendale (Passchendaele Peace Concerts).

Chielens was born in Reningelst. He is co-author, with Julian Putkowski, of Unquiet Graves / Rusteloze Graven Guide: Execution Sites of the First World War in Flanders.

== Bibliography ==
- Putkowski, Julian & Chielens, Piet; Unquiet Graves / Rusteloze Graven Guide: Execution Sites of the First World War in Flanders, (UK: Francis Boutle Publishers, 2000) ISBN 978-1-903427-00-2
