= Chandre Oram =

Indian tea estate worker

Chandre Oram is an Indian tea estate worker who lives in Alipurduar district of Jalpaiguri, West Bengal. He is famous for having a 33 cm (13 inch) long tail, which has made him an object of devotion to many, who believe him to be an incarnation of Hanuman, a Hindu deity associated with monkeys.

== Object of devotion ==
Oram was born on the date known as Rama Navami, which is the birthday of legendary Hindu king Rama who is considered to be an incarnation of Vishnu, one of the many Gods as per Hinduism. According to the Ramayana, Hanuman was devoted to Rama, and helped him rescue his wife, Sita, who was being held captive by an evil king.

As a consequence of his apparent resemblance to Hanuman, Oram has been visited by large numbers of people who wish to receive his blessings. Some of his followers also report miraculous healings of severe ailments after touching his tail. Oram claims to enjoy other aspects of monkey-like behaviour, including jumping, climbing, and eating bananas.

Oram has set up a shrine to honour Hanuman, on top of which there is a red silk flag, which is Hanuman's symbol.

== Clinical explanation ==
According to physicians, the tail Oram has is not a real tail, but a congenital malformation known as spina bifida, in this case of the rare meningocele category. It is possible for human embryos to develop a real tail, as the genes which cause it still exist in many people. However, the probability of this gene expressing is very low: it can happen because of rare recessive gene coupling, or some form of mutation that brings the gene back to a dominant place. That is why very few cases have been recorded in the history of medicine. The presence of these kind of vestigial structures is known as an atavism. When a human embryo develops a true tail, it is located as a prolongation of the coccyx, just like the tail of a dog or a monkey.

Oram's tail emerges from his lumbar region, which is a clear sign that it is caused by split spine. The tail consists of a 33 cm (13 inches) long and 25 mm (1 inch) thick appendix to the bone of the spine. It is covered by much hair.

== Romantic issues ==
Oram has refused any operation to remove his tail. According to his family, it has become a part of him which he could not live without. However, this also has its costs, as he has been unable to settle down and raise a family of his own. He has reported that approximately twenty women have rejected offers of marriage because of his tail. He has said: "I have decided to marry the woman who accepts me and my tail. Or else, I'll remain a bachelor like Hanuman."

Oram was married in 2007 and has a child. According to his wife, "He doesn't look good. My mother and my father passed away when I was young. My brothers wanted me to get married, so I had to compromise and marry him."
