= Nick Oram =

American CEO

Nick Oram (born September 11, 1979) is an American Executive Producer, CEO and COO residing in New York City. He was born in Wisconsin.

== Q on the move (Travel Show) ==
Oram was the Host and Producer of Q on the Move. A production of QTN. Oram took the Q on the move's cameras all across the US.

Oram interviewed political and entertainment personalities as the show toured the US. The Los Angeles episode of the show brought audiences to the LA Fashion Week, to Nike's "Run Hit Wonder" and then on to an exclusive, behind-the-scenes, VIP tour of production Burbank studios. Also in the episode, Oram had several interviews with Hollywood celebrities, including Melissa Etheridge, Paula Abdul, Kathy Griffin, Peter Paige and the "Mayor of Hollywood" Johnny Grant.

Episodes of Q on the Move covered Miami/Fort Lauderdale, Chicago and the Midwest, Las Vegas, the Super Bowl and other destinations.

In 2005, Michael Aller, Tourism and Convention Director and Chief of Protocol for The City of Miami Beach, presented Oram with a key to the city of Miami Beach.
