= Julian Putkowski =

British university teacher & military historian

Julian Putkowski (born 1947) is a British university teacher, military historian, researcher, and broadcaster. He has written extensively on military executions in World War I.

== Life ==
Putkowski graduated from the University of Essex in 1976. He has since then been researching military discipline and dissent. In 1989, he was co-author, with Julian Sykes, of Shot at Dawn: Executions in World War I by Authority of the British Army Act. The publication of the book led indirectly to renewed public interest in the topic of soldiers executed during the war, culminating in the issue of pardons to 306 men who were shot for various offenses, including cowardice.

Later, Putkowski wrote a book entitled Murderous Tommies with Mark Dunning, a lawyer interested in British Army capital courts martial cases. Murderous Tommies is also about the First World War, and gives an account of 13 soldiers who committed homicide in France and Flanders.

== Published works ==
- Putkowski, Julian & Dunning, Mark; Murderous Tommies, (England: Pen & Sword, 2012) ISBN 978-1-84884-626-5
- Putkowski, Julian & Sykes, Julian; Shot at Dawn: Executions in World War I by Authority of the British Army Act, (England: Pen & Sword, 1996) ISBN 978-0-85052-613-4
- Putkowski, Julian; British Army Mutineers 1914-1922, (UK: Francis Boutle Publishers, 1998) ISBN 978-0-9532388-2-8
- Putkowski, Julian & Chielens, Piet; Unquiet Graves / Rusteloze Graven Guide: Execution Sites of the First World War in Flanders, (UK: Francis Boutle Publishers, 2000) ISBN 978-1-903427-00-2
- Putkowski, Julian (trans. Yves Buffetaut), Les Fusillés de King Crater (II), (France: Ysec éditions, 2002) ISBN 2-84673-012-1
- Putkowski, Julian, The Kinmel Park Camp Riots 1919, (England: Flintshire Historical Society. 1989) ISBN 978-0-9512776-1-4
