= Gerard Oram =

British cultural and social historian

Gerard ("Gerry") Oram is a British cultural and social historian, with a particular interest in the First World War.

== Life ==
He was a researcher at the University of Birmingham and a lecturer the Open University, before going on to teach at University of Swansea until 2025. He lectures at Swansea University teaching on a number of modules including Nazi Occupied Europe and the First World War. Oram also lectured at Cardiff University where he taught the War, Liberation and Reconstruction: Europe 1939-51 module. His seminal book, Death Sentences passed by military courts of the British Army 1914–1924, is on the recommended reading lists of the National Archives and the Imperial War Museum.

He is quoted in the British national press on the subject; and he was quoted as a source for an Irish government inquiry into treatment of Irish soldiers.

== Published works include ==
- Oram, Gerard, Death Sentences passed by military courts of the British Army 1914–1924, (UK: Francis Boutle Publishers, 1999) ISBN 1-903427-26-6
- Oram, Gerard, Worthless Men: Race, eugenics and the death penalty in the British Army during the First World War, (UK: Francis Boutle Publishers, 1999) ISBN 0-9532388-3-0
- Oram, Gerard, "The Greatest Efficiency: British and American Military Law 1866–1918" (Chap. 9) Comparative Histories of Crime, B. Godfrey, C. Emsley and G. Dunstall (eds). (Cullompton, Devon: Willan Publishing. 2002) ISBN 1-84392-036-0
- Oram, Gerard, Conflict and Legality: Policing Mid-Twentieth Century Europe (London: Francis Boutle, 2003)
- Oram, Gerard, Military Executions during World War 1 (Palgrave, Basingstoke, 2003).
- Oram, Gerard,‘“The administration of discipline by the English is very rigid”: British Military Law and the Death Penalty (1868–1918)’ in Crime, Histoire et Sociétés/Crime, History and Societies, Vol. 5, No. 1, 2001, pp. 93-110.
- Oram, Gerard,‘Pious Perjury: Morale and Discipline in the British Force in Italy 1917-18’ in War in History, Vol. 9, No. 4, 2002, pp. 412–430.
- Oram, Gerard, ‘Britain - Post First World War Mutinies and Revolutionary Threats’ in Kelly, J. et al. (eds) The International Encyclopaedia of Revolution and Protest, 12 volumes (Blackwell Publishing, 2009)
- Oram, Gerard, ‘Armee, Stat, Büger und Wehrpflicht. Die britische Miltärjustiz bis nach dem Zweiten Weltkrieg’ in Peter Pirker/Florian Wenninger (Ed.): Wehrmachtsjustiz. Kontext - Praxis - Nachwirkungen, Wien (Braumüller Verlag, 2011) pp. 186–203.
