= In Flanders Fields Museum =

World War I military museum in Belgium

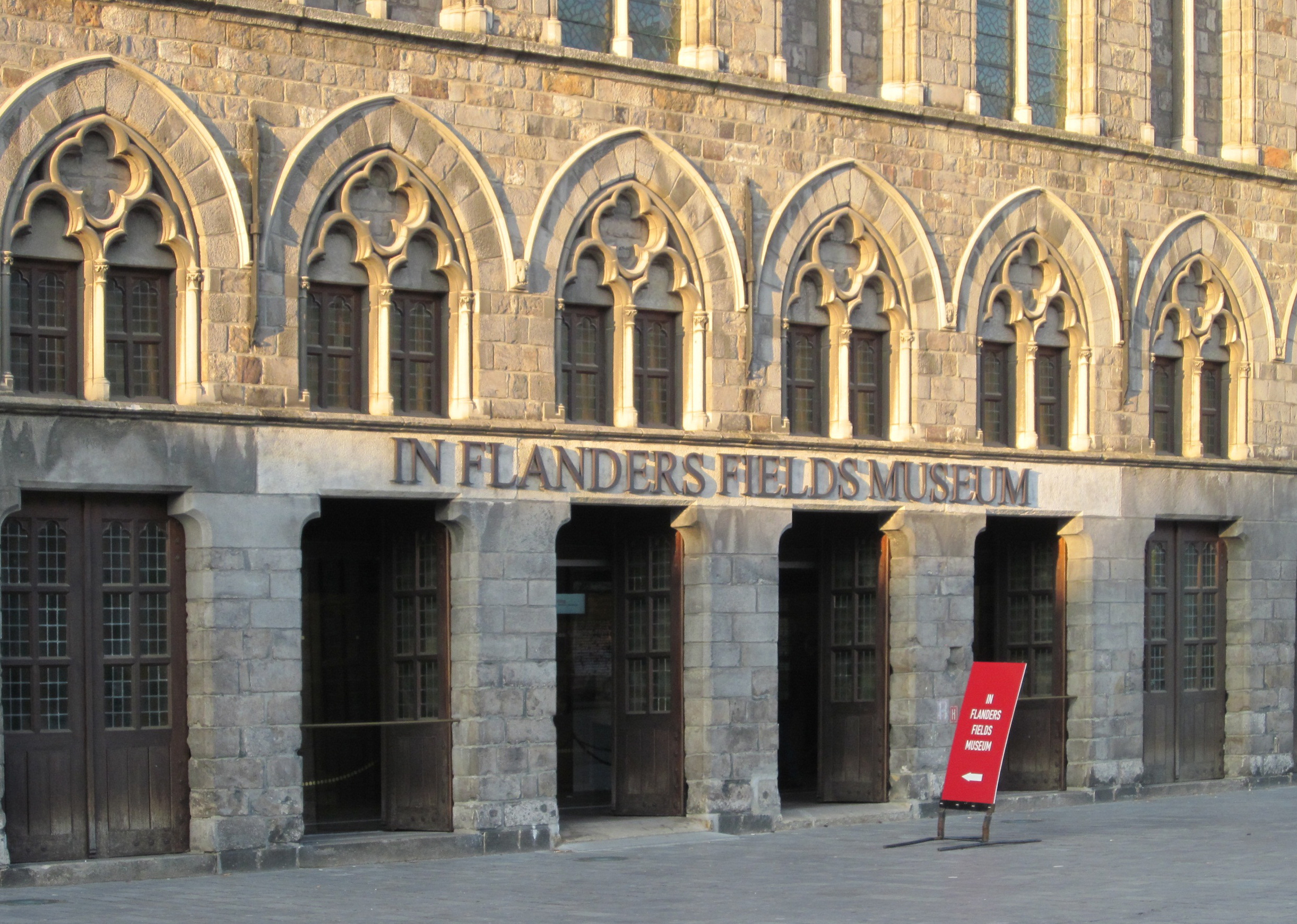
- In Flanders Fields Museum

- Location within Belgium
- Established: 1998
- Location: Lakenhallen, Grote Markt 34, B 8900 Ieper, West Flanders, Belgium
- Coordinates: 50.851235°N 2.885643°E
- Type: World War I Military Museum named for the famous poem by Canadian John McCrae
- Curator: Piet Chielens
- Parking: On site
- Website: www.inflandersfields.be/

The In Flanders Fields Museum is a museum in Ypres (Ieper), Belgium, dedicated to the study of the First World War. It occupies the second floor of the Cloth Hall (Lakenhalle) on the market square in the city centre. The building was largely destroyed by artillery during the war, but was afterwards reconstructed. In 1998 the original Ypres Salient Memorial Museum was refurbished and renamed In Flanders Fields Museum after the famous poem by Canadian John McCrae. Following a period of closure, the museum reopened on 11 June 2012. The curator, Piet Chielens, is a World War I historian.

The museum does not set out to glorify war, but to suggest its futility, particularly as seen in the West Flanders front region in World War I.

== Overview ==
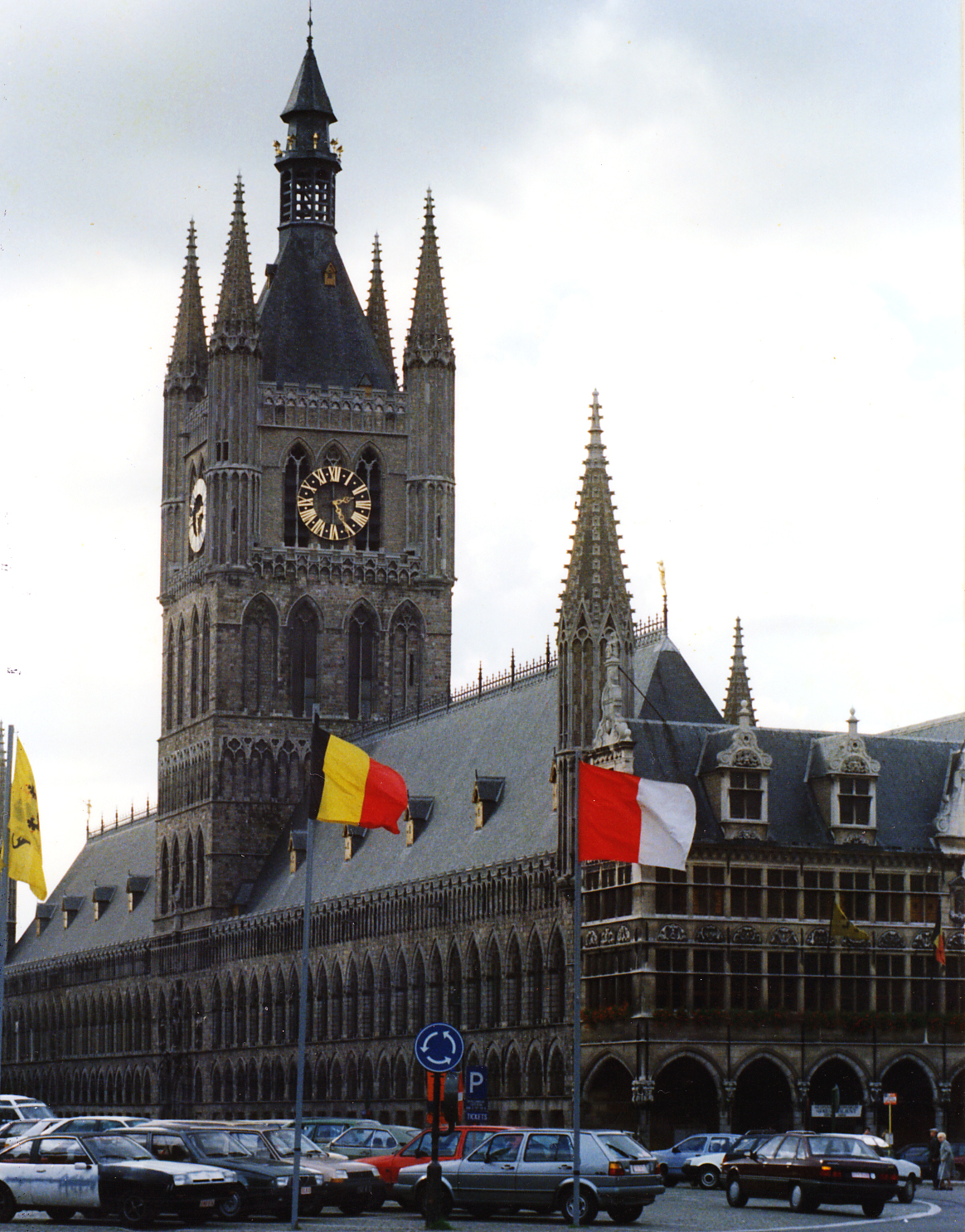
Cloth Hall, Ypres

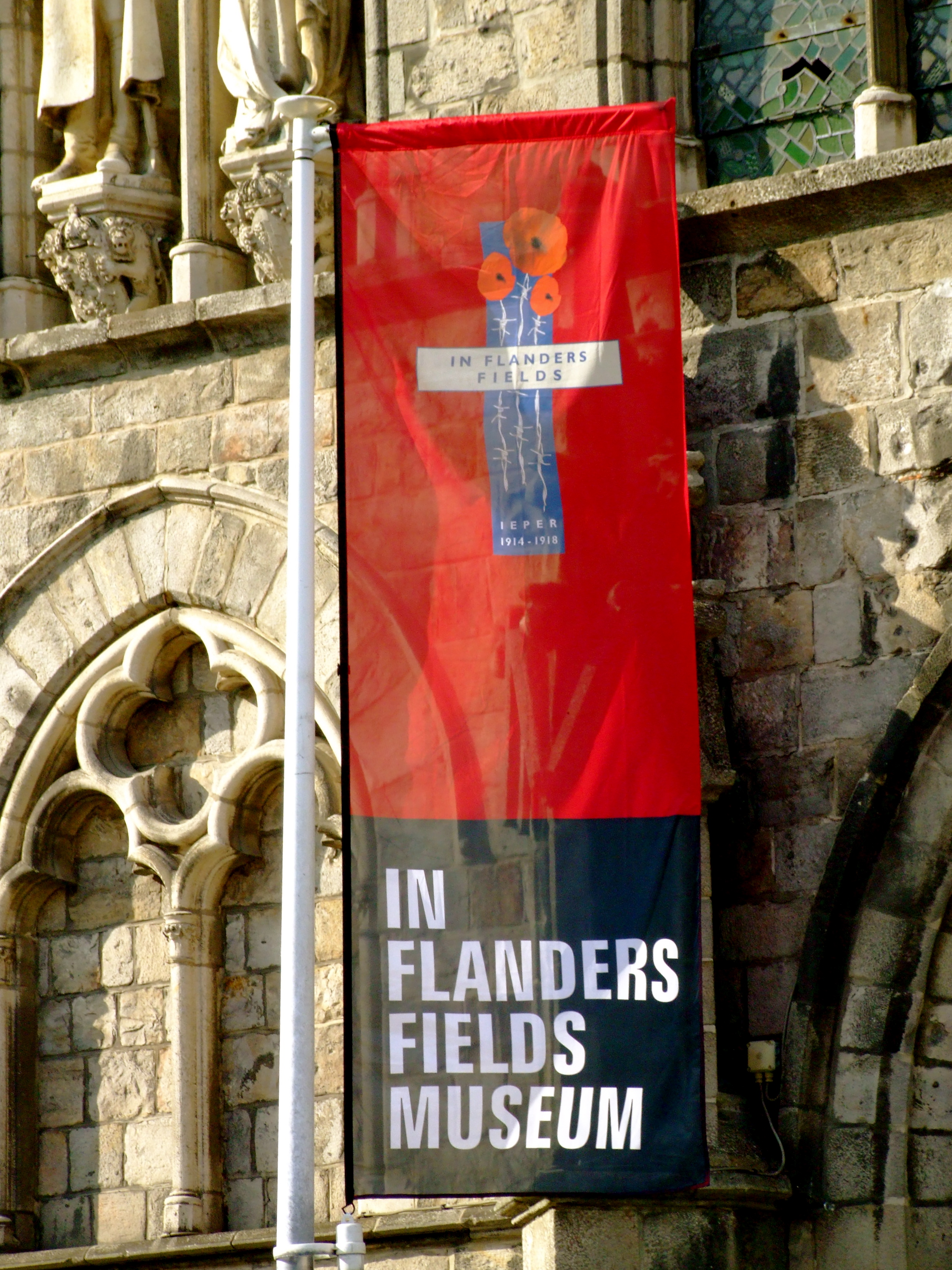
Banner outside the museum

A range of activities are available, including walking itineraries and workshops. On entry to the museum each visitor receives a "Poppy Bracelet" containing a microchip, which activates the chosen language for the visitor. It also activates the personal story of four individuals as the visitor makes his or her way around the exhibitions. The exhibit tells the story of the invasion of Belgium, the first months of the mobilisation, the four years trench war in the Westhoek (from the beach of Nieuwpoort to the Leie in Armentières), the end of the war, and the permanent remembrance ever since. The Bell Tower (Belfry) at the Cloth Hall, offers a view over the city, Saint George's Memorial Church, St Martin's Cathedral, the market place, the surrounding battlefields, and the Menin Gate. The museum presents a general introduction to World War I in Flanders with reference to other Allied museums and sites, such as Sanctuary Wood Museum Hill 62, Museum Godshuis Belle, and Canadian Hill 62 Memorial; whereas the Lange Max Museum focuses on the occupied German side. The museum is intended to encourage the visitor to view the actual sites for themselves.

The personal stories of how the First World War affected the lives of individuals of many nationalities are told through the many objects on display, interactive installations and lifelike characters within the larger picture of the Great War. The displays include medical equipment, gas masks, and a mule and munitions wagon exhibit. Themes of the consequences of war, how we look into our past, and how and why we remember are explored.

== Museum shop ==
The museum shop sells First World War-related books and guides, maps, postcards, CDs and gift items.

== Research ==
The museum includes a new World War I research centre. The Names List Project is a project to compile a list of all those who died in the Westhoek region as a result of the First World War.
