= List of World War I memorials and cemeteries in Flanders =

Location of the Province of West Flanders within Belgium

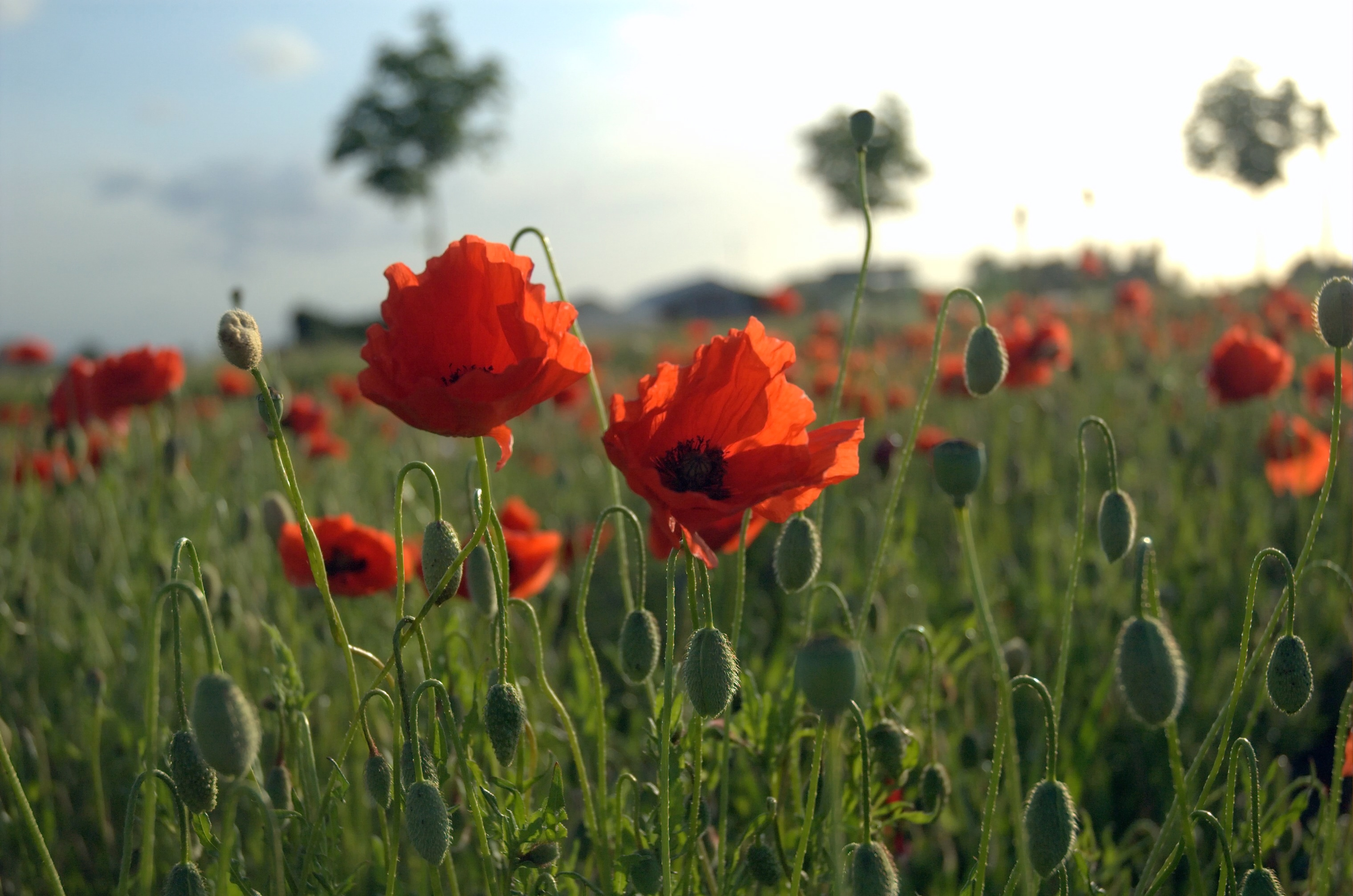
Poppies in Flanders' fields

Several war memorials and war graves have been erected in the Belgian region Flanders to memorialize the events that took place there during World War I. By the end of 1914 the Western Front ran from Nieuwpoort on the North Sea Coast to the Swiss Border. After the war, many memorials were erected in and along the area through which the front line had been. Five memorials are carillons, musical instruments of bells, which memorialize the loss of lives, cultural heritage, and bells during the war. Most of the war memorials in Flanders can be found in the Province of West Flanders (West-Vlaanderen), which comprises the arrondissements of Bruges, Diksmuide, Ypres, Kortrijk, Ostend, Roeselare, Tielt and Veurne.

== Military cemeteries in West Flanders ==
Name	Comments	Image
Belgian Military Cemeteries	The main Belgian Military Cemeteries are at Hoogstade near Alveringem, Oeren near Alveringem, Adinkerke near De Panne, De Panne, Keiem near Diksmuide, Houthulst, Ramskapelle near Nieuwpoort, Steenkerke near Veurne, and Westvleteren. The typical Belgian headstone is of a uniform and distinct shape and colour and the cemeteries are well maintained. See photograph on the right.	Typical Belgian First World War Headstone
British Cemeteries	The website "The Great War in Flanders Fields" lists 173 British Military Cemeteries in West Flanders. Here we see graves at one of the cemeteries at Passendaele.	Passchendaele New British Cemetery.
French Cemeteries	17 French Military Cemeteries are listed by "The Great War in Flanders Fields". In the photograph here we see graves at Roeselare French Military Cemetery.	French military graves, Roeselare Communal Cemetery in Roeselare, Belgium
German Military Cemeteries	There are First World War German cemeteries in Flanders at Vladslo, Menen, Hooglede and Langemark. At Vladslo we can see the sculpture by Käthe Kollwitz called "The Grieving Parents" a memorial to Kollwitz' son Peter who was killed fighting in the area. The photograph shows some of the crosses at Vladslo and the flat headstones seen in many German cemeteries. Vladslo contains 25.644 graves. Started in 1917, it held the bodies of 3,233 soldiers by the end of the war and in 1954 it was agreed that graves be moved to Vladslo, Langemark, Menen and Hooglede from the many smaller burial sites in the area and as a consequence the number of soldiers buried at Vadslo reached the present figure. Menen now holds the remains of 47,864 soldiers, Langemark 44,324 soldiers and Hooglede 8,247. At Langemark there is a distinctive sculpture by Emil Krieger- see photograph in gallery.	Vladslo German war cemetery

== WW I memorials in West Flanders ==
=== Yser Area ===
There are many monuments and memorials in this sector which celebrate the Battle of the Yser and other events. These include –

Name	Location	Comments	Image
The Yser Memorial	Nieuwpoort Belgium	The Yser Memorial was crafted by the Belgian sculptor Pieter-Jan Braecke. It is centered a column, upon which stands the figure of a woman representing Belgium who holds the Belgian crown away from the invading Germans. At each of the four corners of the column's base is a soldier, one of these soldiers has lost his sight, another is wounded, the third is sick whilst the fourth is fit and ready to resist the invader. The memorial was inaugurated on 26 October 1930. A photograph of one of the four soldiers is shown on the right and other photographs of the Yser Memorial appear in the gallery below.	Yser Memorial
The Albert Memorial	Nieuwpoort Belgium	A large circular structure representing a crown is supported by 10 columns and in the centre is a bronze equestrian figure of Albert I, the "Soldier King". The circular structure can be reached by either stairs or a lift and serves as a viewing platform. On the interior side of the circular structure the words of two poems are inscribed, one by August van Cauwelaert and the other by Maurice Gauchez. Some of the bricks carry the names of villages and towns in the Yser area that saw fighting including Boesinghe, St Joris, Tervaete, Vidlette, Diksmuide. The architect/designer was Julien de Ridder and the sculptural work was carried out by Charles Aubroeck. The inauguration and unveiling took place on 24 July 1938 in the presence of Queen Elisabeth, King Leopold III, Prince Charles, Prince Baudouin and Princess Josephine Charlotte. Apart from the equestrian figure, Aubroeck created ten relief panels on the exterior side of the upper circular structure. One of these depicts a scene in the Congo and the others depict various themes including the spiritual life, the sciences, working life in the ports, working life in the mines, leisure time and life at sea. The foundation stone was laid on 8 August 1937. The foundation stone is inscribed "Die VIII Augusti MCMXXXVII positus est hic primarius lapis"	The Albert Memorial
The Nieuwpoort Memorial to the Missing	Nieuwpoort Belgium	The Nieuwpoort Memorial consists of a pylon of Euville stone, 8 metres high, surrounded by a bronze band on which are inscribed the names of the casualties commemorated. The memorial stands on a triangular paved platform and at each corner of the triangle is a recumbent figure of a lion facing outwards. The memorial was designed by William Bryce Binnie. The sculptural work is by Charles Sargeant Jagger.	Nieuport Memorial in Nieuwpoort
A plaque at Ramskapelle acknowledging the assistance of the French	Ramskapelle, Belgium	This is a plaque outside the church at Ramskapelle near Nieuwpoort in West Flanders which acknowledges the role played by the French 16th Division fighting alongside the Belgian 6th Regiment and was erected by its people in gratitude to the French. The plaque was inaugurated in 1938.	Plaque at Ramskapelle (Nieuwpoort), Belgium acknowledging help given by French forces
Marker (Albertina). commemorating the flooding of the Yser	Nieuwpoort. Belgium	We also find near to the Yser Memorial a small memorial commemorating the opening of the Yser floodgates. The inscription in Flemish reads "Onderwaterzetting 29th October 1914", this being the date on which the sluices were finally opened. There are many of these diamond-shaped markers throughout the region. They are known as "Albertina Memorials" and were erected by the Belgians between 1984 and 1988 to commemorate the death of King Albert I. Each bears his monogram and marks a significant site or event relating to the First World War. A link to a listing of all these Albertina Memorials is given here.	Name stone 1914–1918 – "Onderwaterzetting" (Inundation) Nieuwpoort
The Memorial to Admiral Pierre Alexis Ronarc'h and his Marine Fusiliers.	Diksmuide Belgium	This memorial was inaugurated in 1963 and stands in a park off Oostvesten in Diksmuide. It is dedicated to the memory of Admiral Pierre Alexis Ronarc'h and those of his Marine Fuseliers who gave their lives in defending Diksmuide. It comprises a long low wall with a slight curve and a plaque at one end reading "A LA MEMOIRE DE L'AMIRAL RONARC'H ET DES FUSELIERS MARINS GLORIEUSEMENT TOMBES A DIXMUDE 16 OCT-10 NOV 1914" At the other end an anchor is set into an opening in the wall. Set into the ground in front of the plaque is another bronze plaque, this time a circular plaque, which summarised the order given to Admiral Roanrc'h by the French commander in the sector Général d'Urbal. It reads "IL VA DE NOTRE HONNEUR D'AIDER LES BELGES DANS CETTE TACHE JUSQU'A L'EXTREME LIMITE DE NOS MOYENS EN CONSEQUENCE LE PASSAGE DE DIXMUDE DEVRA ETRE TENU PAR VOUS TANT QU'IL RESTERA UN FUSELIER MARIN VIVANT"/ "24 OCT. 1914 – LE GENERAL D'URBAL – L'AMIRAL RONARC'H"	Memorial dedicated to the memory of Pierre Alexis Ronarc'h
The statue of Le General Baron Jacques de Diksmuide	Diksmuide Belgium	By 20 October 1914, the 43rd and 44th German Reserve Divisions were pressing hard against Diksmuide held by just two Belgian Regiments and Admiral Ronarc'h's force of marines. The Belgian 12th Linie Regiment commanded by Colonel Jacques had all of the roads to the east to cover, whilst Admiral Ronarc'h was guarding the western approaches. At 09:00 hours that morning the Germans opened up with their heavy artillery in a bombardment which was eventually to reduce Diksmuide to rubble and both Colonel Jacques and Amiral Ronarc'h had to withdraw.	Monument of General Jacques de Dixmude
The Zeebrugge Memorial- A memorial to the Missing.	Zeebrugge Belgium	The Zeebrugge Memorial is a small stone panel set in the wall of the churchyard, and commemorates three officers and one mechanic of the Royal Navy who lost their lives at Zeebrugge on St George's Day 1918 and have no known grave. The port of Zeebrugge had been used by the British Expeditionary Force in October 1914, and bombed by Commonwealth and French aeroplanes frequently thereafter once occupied by the Germans. On 23 April 1918, British sailors and marines, in a collection of monitors, destroyers, motorboats, launches, old cruisers, old submarines and Mersey ferry-boats attacked the mole at Zeebrugge and attempted to block the canal leading to Bruges.	Zeebrugge Memorial on the Zeebrugge Churchyard
Ijzertoren	Diksmuide Belgium	The Ijzertoren (Yser Tower) is a memorial by the Yser at Diksmuide. The first tower was built after the 1914–18 war by an association of Flemish veterans but this was dynamited in 1946. The authorities never caught those who committed this action and it is thought to have been carried out by French-speaking radicalists. The Ijzertoren has always been a rallying point for Flemish nationalism. A new and indeed higher tower was built and the remains of the old tower now form the "Paxpoort" or "Gate of Peace". The words "Nooit meer Oorlog"(Never again War)is written on the tower in Flemish, French, English and German. The rebuilt tower is 84 metres high. The tower also has the abbreviation "AVV-VVK" written on it. This stands for "Alles Voor Vlaanderen-Vlaanderen voor Kristus" which translates as "All for Flanders-Flanders for Christ". The Ijzertoren has a lift to take you to the top of the tower where there are splendid views of the countryside and a small museum. The peace gate has hugh high reliefs by Charles Aubroeck at each corner. One of these reliefs is a depiction of the painter Joe English English's remains and those of other Flemish heroes are buried in the Ijzertoren crypt. Edward and Frans Van Raemdonck, Lode De Boninge and Frans Van der Linden and Renaat De Rudder are others whose remains are buried in the crypt and were the subjects of Charles Aubroek's reliefs on the "Paxpoort".	The IJzertoren
Artillery Platform of Long Max	Koekelare Belgium	6 km from the German Military Cemetery of Vladslo and 10 km from Diksmuide you can find the artillery platform of Lange Max ("Long Max"). This was the location where the former biggest gun of the world was located. From this location Dunkirk (± 45 km) and Ypres were bombarded. Next to the artillery platform there is the Lange Max Museum.	Lange Max gun ("Long Max"). Koekelare
Dodengang	Diksmuide Belgium	Near to the Ijzertoren is the Dodengang (Trench of Death), a 300 yards section of preserved trench. A demarcation stone was unveiled here in 1922 by King Albert. This particular trench played a key role in preserving the front line in this area and stopping further German incursions.	The Dodengang ("Trench of Death"). Diksmuide

=== Ypres Salient ===
==== Historical background ====
The Ypres Salient was the site of five battles during World War I: The First Battle of Ypres (19 October – 22 November 1914), the Second Battle of Ypres (22 April – 15 May 1915), the Third Battle of Ypres, also known as the Battle of Passchendaele (31 July – 6 November 1917), the Fourth Battle of Ypres, also known as the Battle of the Lys (9–29 April 1918), and the Fifth Battle of Ypres (28 September – 2 October 1918).

Name	Comments	Image
First Ypres	The Salient was formed during the First Battle of Ypres in October and November 1914, when the British Expeditionary Force succeeded in securing the town before the onset of winter, pushing the German forces back as far as the Passchendaele Ridge. Ypres had already seen action when, during the so-called "Race to the Sea", three German cavalry divisions had entered Ypres, Voormezeele and Wytschaete on 3 October 1914. Ypres was looted but the units then moved south. They, and the German infantry were soon headed back to Ypres and both sides prepared their plans of attack not an easy task when one considers that every road in West Flanders at the time was choked with refugees moving south towards the Franco-Belgian border Nieuwpoort was where the complex control of the river, the tides and the levels of nearby canals and effectively the drainage of the Polder Plain was controlled. Many were involved in the operation of opening the sluice gates to effect this inundation but it was Lieutenant-Colonel Nuyten of the Belgian Army and the civilian Hendrik Geereart, a retired waterman, who were to play the major roles. They soon enlisted the help of Karel Cogge, an old-lock keeper. The operation to effect the maximum possible flooding commenced on 25 October 1914. The Germans mounted furious attacks and 21 to 23 October 1914 saw the First Battle of Langemarck, and the so-called "Massacre of the Innocents", when, in a desperate attempt to make a breakthrough, the Germans had thrown their Reserve Corps into the front line. This Reserve Corps was inexperienced and included many young students, some unarmed and lacking basic equipment, who were no match for the professional British and French soldiers. The young reservists died in their hundreds and the Germans failed to take Langemarck. "On 23rd October 1914 they (the reservists) were practically annihilated in the fields in front of Langemarck and Bixschoote by Haig's cool and skilled fifteen-rounds-per-minute professionals, This was the First Battle of Langemarck, 21–23 October 1914." The next phase was the Battle of Gheluvelt, which ran from 29 to 31 October 1914. Now the Germans were to take Zandvoorde and Hollebeke and on 30 October 1914, Gheluvelt (Geluveld) fell to the Germans, was retaken and then fell back into German hands along with Mesen and Wytschaete. St Eloi was the next village to fall and between 10 and 11 November 1914 the 2nd Battle of Langemarck was fought although again the Germans failed to take Langemarck. The Germans stepped up their attacks on 31 October 1914 and German cavalry drove the British cavalry from the Messines Ridge and on 11 November, two premier German divisions (The Prussian Guards Division) attempted to break the British lines at Nun's Wood just north of the Menin Road. The German attacks were held but at a great loss of life. Fighting was to continue until 22 November 1914, when the onset of winter halted fighting. The heavy winter rains began to fall and "the rifle was substituted by the spade". Ypres was to become a name embodied in the English psyche. Thus the first phase of fighting ended, this being known as "First Ypres", and many historians have concluded that this period saw the death of the old British Expeditionary Force (BEF). The fighting had been fierce and the BEF's numbers decimated. Now Britain needed to rebuild her army.	A typical scene of devastation. Location Chateau Wood. 1917– Third Ypres
Second Ypres	During the winter 1914/1915 the French held the Salient from Steenstraat in the north to Hooghe in the south and in the early months of 1915 Canadian and British troops started to take over part of the Salient's front line. By April 1915, the Salient front line was manned by troops from Belgium, from France, from the French Colonies, from Canada and Great Britain. From Steenstrate to the North Sea coast the line was held by the Belgian 6th Division, from Steenstrate to north of Langemarck it was held by the French 87th Territorial Division, and from there to the Ypres to Bruges road south of Poelkapelle it was held by the 45th Algerian Division. From the 45th Algerian up to the "Berlin Wood" near Gravenstafel the line was held by the Canadian 1st Division and from Berlin Wood the line was held by three British Divisions, the 5th, 27th and 28th. On 22 April 1915, the Germans launched another offensive and after a brief preliminary artillery bombardment they used Chlorine gas against the French and Algerian troops defending the line north of the town of Langemarck (the French 87th Territorial and 45th Algerian divisions); the Germans used 168 tons of Chlorine Gas and some 5,000 men were to die of asphyxiation. The troops fled in terror leaving a 7 kilometre gap in the line and the Germans advanced through this gap and captured Langemarck. They then halted and dug in and the allies, in particular the Canadians, were able to close and reinforce the gap. However whilst the German advance was checked they had gained possession of the high ground north of Ypres and in the Salient, as along most of the Western front, it was always a tremendous advantage to hold the high ground. Heavy fighting and further gas attacks continued until 25 May. The Allies held their line but the German 4th Army was now able to use the newly acquired high ground to bomb Ypres with heavy artillery. This period was known as "Second Ypres" and saw very heavy Allied losses and in the subsequent German artillery fire the town of Ypres was practically demolished. British losses were estimated at 59,000, the French lost 10,000 and the Germans 35,000 men. When referring to the Second Battle of Ypres, we include the Battle of Gravenstafel fought from 22 to 23 April, the Battle of St. Julian fought from 22 April to 4 May, the Battle of Frenzenburg fought from 8 to 13 May and the Battle of Bellewaarde fought on 24 and 25 May. The Second Battle of Ypres had then seen the use of gas for the first time, had resulted in an enormous loss of life and had allowed the German Army access to higher ground which their artillery were to use to devastating effect. In Peter Barton's book he writes "The British were left in the uncomfortable position of looking up towards their enemy almost everywhere in the Salient". There was much bravery exhibited but it was the Canadians, and the Canadian Scottish Regiment 16th Battalion, Canadian Expeditionary Force in particular, who saved the day in the Battle of St. Julian at Kitchener's Wood. After May 1915 Ypres was not to see a major battle until 1917. In the meantime there were to be some major distractions in 1916, at Arras. on the Somme and at Verdun. During this time both sides were to concentrate their efforts in the Salient carrying out improvements to their trench systems and defences. Until 1917 what the Salient was to experience was "the war of the guns": the constant use of artillery. The constant sound of the guns was of course terrifying but at least for the time-being the Ypres death-toll was reduced.	
Third Ypres	In 1917 the Allied High Command needed to decide where to mount their next offensive. The British favoured a major assault in the Salient but put these plans to one side and it was in the area of the Aisne and the "Chemin des Dames" that the major effort was to be made! and by the French. General Mangin's campaign was to be a disaster and huge French losses resulted in mutinies amongst the soldiers. The French Army was almost broken and would not be relied upon again for some time. The focus returned to the Salient and in the Third Battle of Ypres an offensive was mounted by Commonwealth forces to divert German attention from the weakened French front further south. The campaign started on a positive note and the attempt in June to dislodge the Germans from the Messines Ridge was a complete success. The ridge, which commanded splendid visibility of the surrounding countryside, was taken. The attack had been preceded by the exploding of 19 mines along the ridge from Hill 60 to Ploegsteert and an artillery bombardment from 2,250 guns. However, the main assault north-eastward, which began at the end of July, quickly became a dogged struggle against determined opposition and the rapidly deteriorating weather. The campaign finally came to a close in November with the capture of Passchendaele. "Third Ypres" then raged from 31 July to 10 November 1917, and was prefaced by the Battle of Messines which raged from 7 to 14 June 1917. Third Ypres encompasses the Battle of Pilckem Ridge 31 July to 2 August 1917, the Battle of Langemark from 16 to 18 August 1917, the Battle of Menin Road from 20 August to 25 September 1917, the Battle of Polygon Wood from 26 September to 3 October 1917, the Battle of Broodseinde on 4 October 1917, the Battle of Poelkapelle on 9 October 1917, and the two Battles of Passchendaele, the first on 12 October 1917 and the second from 26 October to 10 November 1917. Dreadful weather had dogged the campaign; the period from August to November 1917 was the wettest on record for the area and after 270,000 casualties and little gain of territory, the battle petered out by 10 November. The name of Passchendaele had been added to our "lexicon of horror".	The morning after the first battle of Passchendaele [Paschendale], Australian Infantry wounded around a blockhouse near the site of Zonnebeke Railway Station,12 October 1917
Fourth Ypres	The German Spring Offensive of March 1918 met with some initial success, but was eventually checked and repulsed in a combined effort by the Allies in September. The Fourth Battle of Ypres, or "Fourth Ypres", the so-called "Kaiserschlacht" ran from 9 to 29 April 1918. The encounter is also known as the Battle of Lys and encompasses the Battle of Estaires from 9 to 11 April, of Messines from 10 to 11 April, of Hazebrouck from 12 to 15 April, of Baillleul from 13 to 15 April, of Kemmel from 17 to 19 April, of Bethune on 18 April, Second Kemmel from 25 to 26 April and of Scherpenberg on 29 April. The Germans were now able to use troops released from fighting in the east, following the end of the war on the Eastern Front. The Germans aimed to crush the Allies before the Americans, who had now entered the war, could swing the numerical superiority back to the Allies. The action started in the Somme area and then moved to the Ypres sector. Ypres was almost lost but the Allies were able to regroup after the Germans called a temporary halt in their advance. During this battle the British conceded the ground they had conquered in the 3rd Battle of Ypres, including the Passchendaele salient.	British 55th (West Lancashire) Division troops blinded by poison gas await treatment at an Advanced Dressing Station near Bethune during the Battle of Estaires, 10 April 1918, part of the German offensive in Flanders.
Fifth Ypres	By the summer of 1918 the tide had turned at last and British troops took Loker, Kemmel, Dranouter, Nieuwkerke, Ploegsteert and Nieppe. The final Battle in the Salient ran from 28 September to 2 October 1918 and the Battle of Kortrijk from 14 to 19 October 1918. A breakthrough was achieved and by 11 November 1918, when peace was declared, the Allies were 51 miles east of the salient. In a short time the whole salient was reconquered. Langemarck and Poelkapelle were taken by the Belgian 9th Infantry Division, Passchendaele taken by Belgian Karabiniers and Grenadiers (6th and 12th Infantry Division), Zonnebeke and Broodseinde taken by the 17th Belgian Linie, Beselare by Scots from the British 29th Division and Geluveldt by troops of the Worcestershire Regiment, also part of the British 29th Division. By 11 November the Allied line stretched from Terneuzen over Ghent to Mons and further on towards Mezieres and Sedan! At last the war was over but at a terrible cost and no more so than in the Ypres sector. After the war there was talk of keeping the ruins of Ypres as they were to serve as a permanent war memorial. Winston Churchill in particular was a strong advocate of this. In files WO 32/5569 and WO 32/5853 held at The National Archives we can follow the discussions concerning this proposal. As it was perhaps never a really practical idea it was eventually dropped but it does show how emotional people were about the Ypres area in the immediate years after the war had ended. So many lives had been lost there and our soldiers had fought in conditions so awful that no words can describe them.	The war is over!

==== Memorials to the French ====
Name	Comments	Image
The Ypres Memorial to Fallen French Heroes 1914–1918	The memorial is a plaque fixed to the south façade of the Cloth Hall to the right of the Donkerpoort gateway and under the belfry and commemorates those members of the French military forces who fell fighting in the defence of the Ypres region. The memorial is dedicated from their "brothers in arms" and the "people of Ypres".	
Cross of Reconciliation at Lizerne.	This is a memorial to French troops gassed by the Germans when they used chlorine on 22 April 1915 at Second Ypres. The Cross of Reconciliation is an aluminium cross on the west side of the Ypres-Yser canal at Lizerne. The original memorial was destroyed during the German occupation of the area in the Second World War.	
Breton Memorial to the French 87th and 45th Division near Pilkem	This memorial commemorates French troops killed and wounded in the German gas attack on 22 April 1915 and those who fought in the Second Battle of Ypres. The memorial comprises an original 16th century calvaire (crucifix) in the traditional Breton style from Brittany. The monument is located behind that part of the French front line which had been held by the 87th Territorial Division and 45th Algerian Division in April 1915. It is situated at the Carrefour de la Rose (known as Rose Crossroads on British Army trench maps) on the Langemarck-Boezinge road, about 1 kilometre west of Pilkem. The 87th Territorial Division hailed from Brittany and was composed of reservists rather than younger conscripts. They were known fondly as Les pépères, or grandads. Many of those who had fallen were repatriated to their village cemeteries and it was thought fitting that a place of memory should be created where the unit had fought.	
Calvaire Breton Monument at Saint-Charles de Potyze Cemetery	This Calvary by Jean Fréour depicts grieving French women who have lost loved-ones in battle. It is in the style of those calvaries unique to the Breton region of North-West France. Saint-Charles de Potyze Cemetery was created during the First World War and redeveloped in 1920, 1922 and from 1925 to 1929, when French soldiers were exhumed and brought here as a final resting place from the Flanders Front, the Yser river region and the Belgian coast. There are 3,547 named military dead and the remains of 609 soldiers in the cemetery ossuary. After the Great War many of the unidentified French soldiers were exhumed and reinterred in the ossuary at Mont Kemmel. Jean Fréour (1919–2010), was a member of the Breton art movement Seiz Breur. In his long working life he created many religious calvary monuments and fine statues in Brittany and other parts of France. Breton calvaire monuments were typified by having three-dimensional figures on and around the cross. See photograph on the right and further photographs in the gallery below.	
Memorial aux Soldats Français 1914-1918-The French Monument at Mont Kemmel	The Mémorial aux Soldats Français 1914–1918 commemorates those French units engaged in the Battles for Mont Kemmel between 15 and 30 April 1918. This 16-metre-high (52 ft) French monument shows Nike, the goddess of victory, looking out towards the area where the French fought. It was unveiled in 1932 by Pétain. On 25 April 1918 a single French Division, which had only taken over the position a week beforehand, found itself opposed by three and a half German Divisions. An hour of furious bombardment was considered sufficient by the Germans and at 06:00 hours they launched their infantry into the attack. By 07:10 hours Mont Kemmel was theirs and by 10:30 hours it was all over. The hill which had remained in Allied hands for four years had been taken by a spectacular display of brute force. Even the German airforce had joined in with 96 aircraft dropping 700 bombs and machine gunning the French positions as the Leib Regiment of the élite Alpine Corps stormed forward.	Mont Kemmel in 1918. One can see the marks of constant artillery bombardment The sculpture on the Memorial aux soldats français known as the "Angel"
The French Memorial and Ossuary at Mount Kemmel	The Mount Kemmel Cemetery and Ossuary were created in the 1920s for 5,237 unknown French soldiers gradually moved from Saint-Charles de Potyze Cemetery French Military Cemetery. The obelisk marking the ossuary records the names of 57 identified men who were killed on the western slope of Mont Kemmel and whose remains lie in the ossuary. The remaining bodies were not identified.	

==== Memorials to military units ====
===== Divisional memorials =====
Name	Comments	Image
Memorial to the 49th (West Riding) Division	The 49th (West Riding) Infantry Division Memorial, which takes the form of an obelisk, is located immediately behind the Essex Farm CWGC Cemetery within the John McCrae Memorial Site at Boezinge where several men of the 49th are buried. The 49th (West Riding) Division had served in this sector in 1915. In the Essex Farm CWGC Cemetery there is a memorial to John McCrae, a Canadian Doctor and author, as it was here that McCrae wrote the poem "In Flanders Fields". The memorial is shown to the right and there is a photograph of the McCrae Memorial in the gallery below.	War site John McCrae
Memorial to the 5th Australian Division	The 5th Division was formed in February 1916 as part of the expansion of the First Australian Imperial Force infantry brigades. In addition to the existing 8th Brigade were added the new 14th and 15th Brigades, which had been raised from the battalions of the 1st and 2nd Brigades respectively. From Egypt the division was sent to France, where they served in the trenches along the Western Front. This memorial to the 5th Australian Division stands on the site of the Butte at Polygon Wood, overlooking the military cemetery there and just by Zonnebeke. A plaque on the memorial lists the many places where the 5th saw action.	Memorial to the 5th Australian Division
Memorial to the 7th Division at Zonnebeke	The 7th Division Memorial comprises an obelisk bearing the legend '7' on all four sides. The lettering inscribed upon the memorial – which was erected in 1924 on the site of a pre-war chapel – is now somewhat faded. The memorial is located in the area where the first trenches in the Ypres Salient were dug by the British 7th Division in mid-October 1914. The memorial commemorates the actions of the 7th Division who were based in the area in both 1914 and 1917 when they secured the Zonnebeke Ridge.	William Orpen's painting of Zonnebeke
14th Light Division Memorial	The 14th Light Division memorial is located at Hill 60 in the Ypres Salient and was moved to this location from Railway Wood, a few kilometres north of Hill 60, after some problems with subsidence. It stands just outside the perimeter of the Hill 60 Memorial Site next to the Australian Tunnelling Company memorial. File WO 32/5126 held at The National Archives gives some background information on the memorial and covers the period 1924 to 1926. We learn that this memorial was unveiled on 26 September 1926 and the unveiling was attended by a party of four buglers, two from the King's Royal Rifle Corps and two from the Rifle Brigade and some 70 members of the Division under the supervision of Lieutenant Colonel B.C.T. Paget DSCO, MC, of the Oxfordshire and Buckinghamshire Light Infantry. The memorial records that the Division landed in France in May 1915, comprising King's Royal Rifle Corps, Rifle Brigade, Oxford & Buckinghamshire Cyclist Co., Royal Engineers, Signals, Pioneers and a Mobile Veterinary Section. The battle honours of the Division are listed, and include Ypres, the Somme and Arras.	
Memorial to the 16th (Irish) Division at Wytschaete	The memorial to the 16th (Irish) Division is sited next to Wytschaete cemetery in the Ypres Salient. It commemorates 16th Division's capture of Wytschaete on 7 June 1917, the opening day of the Battle of Messines. Wytschaete was lost to the Germans during the Spring advance of April 1918 and was recaptured on 28 September 1918. A second memorial to the division is located at Guillemont on the Somme. The British troops referred to Wytschaete as "whitesheet".	Wytschaete Military Cemetery. Memorial to the 16th Irish Division
18th Division Memorial	Dedicated to officers and men of the 18th Division, the memorial is located on the south side of the Menenstraat (the Menin Road) N8, approximately 2 kilometres east of Hooge in an area known as "Clapham Junction"	Entrance stone to Menin Road South Military Cemetery
19th Division Memorial at Wytschaete	With the opening of the Battle of Messines on 7 June 1917, the 19th Division was among the first to advance in the wake of the explosion of 19 mines which signified the start of the attack at 3.10am. The memorial is sited at the crossroads which the division successfully reached within five hours of the start of the attack, which included the taking of the hamlet of Oosttaverne nearby. During the attack 19th Division lost 51 officers and some 1,358 other ranks but they captured 1,253 German prisoners. The 19th Division were in action again here in April 1918 during the Battle of Lys.	Entrance to the Oosttaverne Wood Cemetery
Memorial to the 20th (Light) Division	The memorial, to be found in the village of Langemark, commemorates the actions of 60th and 61st Brigades of the 20th Division on 16 August 1917 when they crossed the Steenbeek and engaged the Germans. During this action, Private Wilfred Edwards of the 7th KOYLI and Sergeant Edward Cooper of the 12th KRRC won Victoria Crosses.	Memorial to 20th Light Division, close to Delville Wood
Memorial to the Artillery and Engineers of the 34th Division	This memorial is situated near the German Cemetery at Langemark on the east bank of the Broenbeek. The 34th Division fought near this spot in October and November 1917. The main inscription on the obelisk reads "To the glory of God and in memory of The Officers, Warrant and Non Commissioned Officers and men of the Artillery and Engineers of the 34th British Division who fought near this spot October – November 1917"	
50th Northumbrian Division Memorial	Dedicated to all ranks of the 50th Northumbrian Division who fell in the Great War. This memorial also commemorates the men of this division who gave their lives in the Second World War in the fight to liberate France, Belgium and the Netherlands. The monument is located on the south side of the Wieltje road (wieltjesstraat) just off the N313 north-east of Ypres. It is sited near the Oxford Road cemetery where many members of the division were buried. The 50th Division was formed from territorial origins in the north-east of England and was despatched to the Western Front in April 1915 where it quickly saw action during the Second Battle of Ypres and helped to smash the Hindenburg Line in October 1918. Behind the memorial are barely visible bunkers comprising the line of the notorious Cambrai Redoubt.	
66th Division Memorial Window	A memorial window in the north side of the rebuilt church at Passchendaele (Passendale) commemorates the officers and men of the 66th Division. Passchendaele's church was totally destroyed by shellfire in 1917. However, it has since been reconstructed and now dominates the village square. Within the church are memorial windows in honour of the 66th Division. There are three windows. The left states "1914" at the bottom, with the names and shields of several northern towns above, including Bury, Accrington, Bolton, Blackburn and Wigan. The larger central window states "66th Division, British Expeditionary Force, In Memoriam". Above this is a depiction of St George and above that a shield with three lions representing the Duchy of Lancaster. The shields and names of Manchester and Salford are also depicted. The right window states "1918" and bears the shields of Padiham, Bacup, Todmorden and others.	
85th Canadian Infantry Brigade Memorial.	Dedicated to the officers and men of the Nova Scotia Highlanders, the 85th Canadian Infantry Brigade, who captured the ridge in November 1917. The monument is on the east side of the N303 Passendale-Broodseinde road, a little to the south of Passchendaele. A grassy path leads to the memorial situated in the centre of a field. The 85th Canadian Infantry ('Nova Scotia') Battalion – part of the 4th Canadian Division – memorial is located near to Passchendaele and to Tyne Cot cemetery. One side of the memorial lists the names of servicemen killed during the Passchendaele actions.	
United States Memorial to the 27th and 30th Division	There is a memorial at Kemmel to these two divisions of the United States Army commemorating their part in the battles here in August and September 1918. The 27th and 30th Divisions in the United States Army fought near Wytschaete alongside the British Army from 18 August to 4 September 1918. The monument stands on a low platform and consists of a rectangular white stone block, in front of which is carved a soldier's helmet upon a wreath. It was designed by George Howe of Philadelphia. These two Divisions had arrived in Belgium in July 1918. At the beginning of their involvement, and to assist with acclimatisation, the American troops were usually placed alongside either French or British Divisions from whom they would receive technical assistance and instruction. In the case of the 27th and 30th Division they served with the British Army throughout the remainder of the war.	Memorial located on the road between Ypres and Kemmel, commemorating the services of the 27th and 30th Divisions with the British Army

===== Regimental memorials =====
Name	Comments	Image
Tank Memorial Ypres Salient	The Tank Memorial Ypres Salient was unveiled as recently as 10 October 2009 in memory of the first tank victims of the First World War and stands in Guynemer Square in Poelkapelle. It was at Poelkapelle that a tank battle took place in 1917 and many British tanks either got stuck in the mud of the Salient or were destroyed by the Germans. A Damon II was one such tank that got bogged down in the mud and remained there after the war and in 1923 the tank was moved to the Poelkapelle market square but was removed by the Germans in 1941. It was finally decided to erect this memorial to honour the efforts of British tank crews in the Salient. The commemoration book contains a list of the 242 tank crew lost in the region.	
South Wales Borderers Memorial	The memorial commemorates the part played by the South Wales Borderers in the fight to hold Gheluvelt village during the First Battle of Ypres in October and November 1914. It is located at the site of the 1914 windmill in the eastern part of Gheluvelt village.	
Princess Patricia's Canadian Light Infantry Memorial	The memorial is located on the Frezenberg Ridge where the Princess Patricia's Canadian Light Infantry fought and suffered very heavy losses in May 1915 during the Second Battle of Ypres.	
The Gloucestershire Regiment Memorial on the Menin Road	The memorial takes the form of an obelisk and commemorates all ranks of the Gloucestershire Regiment who fought and fell in the campaigns of 1914–1918. The memorial is located on the north side of the Menenstraat (the Menin Road) N8, approximately 2 kilometres east of Hooge.	
The London Scottish Memorial at Wytschaete	The 1st Battalion was mobilised as soon as war broke out and at Messines on Hallowe’en 31 October 1914 it was the first Territorial infantry battalion in action against the Germans. The Battalion continued to serve in France and Flanders throughout the war and took part in all the major offenses, including the last advance through Belgium, to become part of the Army of Occupation on the Rhine at Cologne. The London Scottish Memorial stands on a spot near to where this 31 October 1914 action took place. In 1914 the Territorials had expected to work to the rear of the line whilst the regular soldiers did the fighting, but this was not to be and the sheer numbers of Germans being thrown into the battle and the fact that so many regular soldiers were being killed meant that the Territorials were thrown into the thick of the fighting. They acquitted themselves in a glorious fashion. Some photographs of the memorial which takes the form of a Celtic Cross are shown in the gallery below.	London Scottish Memorial
Memorial to Household Cavalry at Zandvoorde	On 30 October 1914, the village of Zantvoorde (now Zandvoorde) was held by the 1st and 2nd Life Guards, numbering between 300 and 400 men. It was bombarded for over an hour with heavy guns and then taken by the 39th German Division and three attached battalions. The whole front of the 3rd Cavalry Division was driven back to the Klein-Zillebeke ridge. The village could not be retaken and remained in German hands until 28 September 1918. The Household Cavalry Memorial, unveiled by Lord Haig in May 1924, stands on the South side of the village at the place where part of the Brigade was annihilated in 1914. Zantvoorde British Cemetery was made after the Armistice when remains were brought in from the battlefields and nearby German cemeteries. Many were those of soldiers who died in the desperate fighting round Zantvoorde, Zillebeke and Gheluvelt in the latter part of October 1914. There are now 1,583 servicemen of the First World War buried or commemorated in the cemetery. 1,135 of the burials are unidentified. The cemetery was designed by Charles Holden.	Zantvoorde British Cemetery
Memorial to the King's Royal Rifle Corps at Hooge	This memorial is dedicated to the officers and men of the KRRC, Kings Royal Rifle Corps and is located near the Chateau Hooge Crater Cemetery which was begun by the 7th Division Burial Officer early in October, 1917. It originally contained 76 graves but was greatly increased after the Armistice by the concentration of graves from smaller cemeteries and from the battlefields of Zillebeke, Zantvoorde and Gheluvelt.	
1st Monmouthshire Regiment Memorial	This memorial is dedicated to Second-Lieutenant Anthony Birrell-Anthony and all officers and men of the 1st Monmouthshire Regiment who fell in the Second Battle of Ypres in May 1915. Birrell-Anthony was one of 7 officers and 176 other ranks who died on 8 May 1915. An eighth officer died in German captivity at Roeslare a little later from his wounds. Birrell-Anthony's remains have not been found and he and many of his comrades are commemorated on Panel 50 of the Menin Gate Memorial to the Missing in Ypres. The Monmouthshire Regiment monument is located on the south side of Roeselarestraat north-east of Ypres.	
2nd Battalion Worcestershire Regiment Memorial	The monument commemorates the part played by the 2nd Battalion the Worcesters in the successful counter-attack on 31 October 1914 to retake the village of Gheluvelt. This action blocked the advance of the German Army towards Ypres at a crucial time during the First Battle of Ypres. The monument is situated on the site of the former 1914 windmill at Gheluvelt. There is a public park in Barbourne in Worcester called Gheluvelt Park. It was opened in 1922 to commemorate the heroism of the Worcester Regiment at the 1914 Battle of Gheluvelt in Belgium. The row of houses inside the park just beyond the gates were built to house war veterans.	
The Canadian Hill 62 Memorial	The Canadian Hill 62 memorial – known as Mount Sorrel – is sited next to the Sanctuary Wood museum in the Ypres Salient. The name 'Hill 62' referred to the area's height above sea level in metres. Although referred to as Mount Sorrel the Canadian memorial is actually located some 800 yards north of Mount Sorrel itself. The memorial comprises a block of white Quebec granite weighing almost 15 tons and bears the inscription "Here at Mount Sorrel on the line from Hooge to St. Eloi, the Canadian Corps fought in the defence of Ypres April–August 1916".	Canadian Memorial Hill 62
The Passchendaele Memorial-Crest Farm	Following the victory at Vimy, the Canadians had continued operations in the Arras area to divert attention from the French front and to conceal from the Germans the planned offensive in Flanders. In the Battle of Hill 70 which ran from 15 to 25 August 1917, Canadian forces captured this strategic position on the northern approach to the city of Lens and secured the western part of the city. The fighting here cost the Canadian Corps 9,198 casualties. However, considerable ground was gained and the battle hampered enemy plans to send fresh troops to Flanders. To the south the French offensive in Lorraine under General Nivelle was proving to be an unmitigated disaster and with losses in the neighbourhood of 200,000 men, it precipitated a wave of mutinies that paralyzed the French army for months. In July, the British commander Sir Douglas Haig launched his drive in Flanders designed to break through the front and capture the German submarine bases on the Belgian coast. The offensive had had a successful prelude at Messines in June, but this local success was followed by weeks of delay. The second and main stage of the attack got under way with a tremendous artillery barrage that not only forewarned the Germans, but also ground the battlefield into potholes and dust. Summer rains poured down on the very night that the offensive began and in no time the area became an impassable swamp. As the British soldiers struggled in the morass, the Germans inflicted frightful casualties from lines fortified with machine guns placed in concrete pill boxes. In the next four months at Ypres only negligible advances were made. Early in October, although the main objectives were still in German hands and the British forces were reaching the point of exhaustion, Haig determined on one more drive. The Canadian Corps was ordered to relieve the decimated Anzac forces in the Ypres sector and prepare for the capture of Passchendaele. General Currie inspected the muddy battlefield and protested that the operation was impossible without heavy cost. He was overruled and so began careful and painstaking preparations for the assault. In a series of attacks beginning on 26 October, 20,000 men under heavy fire inched their way from shell-crater to shell-crater. Then on 30 October, with two British divisions, the Canadians began the assault on Passchendale itself. They gained the ruined outskirts of the village during a violent rainstorm and for five days they held on grimly, often waist-deep in mud and exposed to a hail of jagged iron from German shelling. On 6 November, when reinforcements arrived, four-fifths of the attackers were dead. Currie's estimate of 16,000 casualties proved frighteningly accurate. Passchendaele had become a Canadian Calvary. The award of no fewer than nine Victoria Crosses testified to the heroic determination and skill with which Canadian soldiers played their part in the bitter struggle for Passchendaele. This memorial stands where Canadian soldiers encountered some of the fiercest resistance they were to meet during the war. A large block of Canadian granite set in a grove of maple trees and encircled with a low hedge of holly carries the inscription "The Canadian Corps in Oct–Nov. 1917 advanced across this valley-then a treacherous morass-captured and held the Passchendaele Ridge"	Crest Farm Memorial

===== Memorials linked to Hill 60 =====
Name	Location	Comments	Image
Hill 60 Battlefield Memorial Site		This area was 60 metres above sea level, hence its name Hill 60. This high ground was in fact man-made in the 1850s, having been created by the spoil from the cutting for the railway line between Ypres and Comines which was opened in March 1854. The hill was the scene of much fighting during the 1914–18 war and a "Memorial Site" was established here which is maintained by the Commonwealth War Graves Commission. Hill 60 saw fighting in April and May 1915 between the British and German armies. The launch of a British attack on 17 April 1915 began with the explosion of three mines which literally blew the top off the hill and hundreds of soldiers lost their lives at that time and many bodies were never recovered and are still buried there. The Memorial Site also has the remains of several concrete bunkers and craters from the 1915/16 and 1917 battles. One large bunker in the centre of the site is preserved almost as it was found at the end of the war. There are three memorials on Hill 60, that to the Australian Tunnelling Companies, that to Queen Victoria's Rifles and that to the 14th (Light) Division. Also on Hill 60 is a stone plaque which gives the following summary "HILL 60, THE SCENE OF BITTER FIGHTING, WAS HELD BY GERMAN TROOPS FROM THE 16TH DECEMBER 1914 TO THE 17TH APRIL 1915, WHEN IT WAS CAPTURED (AFTER THE EXPLOSION OF FIVE MINES) BY THE BRITISH 5TH DIVISION. ON THE FOLLOWING 5TH MAY IT WAS RECAPTURED BY THE GERMAN XV CORPS. IT REMAINED IN GERMAN HANDS UNTIL THE BATTLE OF MESSINES (7TH JUNE 1917) WHEN, AFTER MANY MONTHS OF UNDERGROUND FIGHTING, TWO MINES WERE EXPLODED HERE; AND AT THE END OF APRIL 1918, AFTER THE BATTLES OF THE LYS, IT PASSED INTO GERMAN HANDS AGAIN. IT WAS FINALLY RETAKEN BY BRITISH TROOPS UNDER THE COMMAND OF H.M.KING OF THE BELGIANS ON THE 28TH SEPTEMBER 1918. IN THE BROKEN TUNNELS BENEATH THIS ENCLOSURE MANY BRITISH AND GERMAN DEAD WERE BURIED, AND THE HILL IS THEREFORE PRESERVED, SO FAR AS NATURE WILL PERMIT, IN THE STATE IN WHICH IT WAS LEFT AFTER THE GREAT WAR."	Hill 60 Battlefield Memorial Site
1st Australian Tunnelling Company Memorial		This memorial commemorates the men of the 1st Australian Tunnelling Company who gave their lives in the tunneling and defensive operations in this area from 1915 to 1918. The memorial is located next to the entrance gate of the Hill 60 Battlefield Memorial Site in Zillebeke. The inscription reads as follows "IN MEMORIAM OF OFFICERS AND MEN OF THE 1ST AUSTRALIAN TUNNELLING COY WHO GAVE THEIR LIVES IN THE MINING AND DEFENSIVE OPERATIONS OF HILL 60 1915–1918 / THIS MONUMENT REPLACES THAT ORIGINALLY ERECTED IN APRIL 1919 BY THEIR COMRADES IN ARMS / 1923"	1st Australian Tunnelling Company Memorial
The Queen Victoria's Rifles Memorial at Hill 60.		The memorial to the Queen Victoria's Rifles (9th Battalion The London Regiment) is located within the Hill 60 Battlefield Memorial Park. It was replaced after the original was damaged during the Second World War. On the night of 20–21 April 1915, Second Lieutenant Geoffrey Harold Woolley and a handful of men were the only defenders on the hill and continually repelled attacks on their position. He encouraged the men to hold the line against heavy enemy machine gun fire and shellfire. For a time he was the only officer on the hill. When he and his men were relieved on the morning of 21 April only 14 out of a company of 150 had survived. For his gallantry he was awarded the Victoria Cross, the first to be awarded to a Territorial Force officer. The Queen Victoria's Rifles (QVR) had arrived in Le Havre on 5 November 1914 and were one of the first Territorial battalions to serve in France; they were attached to the 5th Division. On 17 April 1915, an attack was mounted on Hill 60 by the 13th Infantry Brigade which included the 2nd King's Own Scottish Borderers, the 2nd Duke of Wellington's West Riding Regiment, the 1st Queen's Own Royal West Kent Regiment, the 2nd King's Own Yorkshire Light Infantry and the Queen Victoria's Rifles (9th London Regiment). Prior to the attack, the hill had been undermined with five galleries being driven under the German positions. The plan was to detonate the mines under the hill to destroy the enemy and their positions, after which the 13th Infantry Brigade would occupy the area. Hill 60 was captured on 17 April 1915 and on 20 April, two and a half companies of the QVRs were ordered up to the front line as the enemy made a counter-attack. At dawn on 21 April 1915, the Germans began bombarding the QVRs with hand grenades. Casualties were heavy, including two officers, Major Lees and Lieutenant Summerhays, who were killed. It was then that Lieutenant Woolley left a position of safety to take command of the soldiers on Hill 60. The QVRs remained in France for the rest of the war. Their losses are remembered at Hill 60 by the QVR memorial and at the nearby QVR café and museum.	Queen Victoria's Rifles Memorial
14th (Light) Division Memorial		This memorial commemorates the men of the 14th (Light) Division who gave their lives in fighting in this area from 1915 to 1918. The memorial is located outside the Hill 60 Battlefield Memorial Park, between the 1st Australian Tunnelling Company Memorial	14th (Light) Division Memorial

==== Memorials to the Missing ====
In the Ypres Salient battlefields there are approximately 90,000 British and Commonwealth soldiers whose remains could not be identified for burial in a grave marked with their name. Similarly, there are also believed to be about 90,000 German soldiers whose remains were never identified as was the case with the remains of many French soldiers found on the battlefields. For the 90,000 missing British Forces there are four memorials in the Ypres Salient which cover the whole period of the First World War, except the months of August and September 1914:

- The Menin Gate Memorial to the Missing.
- The Tyne Cot Memorial to the Missing.
- The New Zealand Memorial (Tyne Cot Cemetery).
- The Messines Ridge (New Zealand) Memorial.

The Ploegsteert Memorial to the Missing south of Messines is technically outside the sector known as the Ypres Salient, and commemorates the missing of the Lys battlefield sector. Its proximity to Ypres means that many visitors to the Ypres Salient include this in their visit to the area. Names of missing German soldiers are inscribed on oak panels and bronze tablets at Langemark German cemetery and French soldiers are commemorated in several ossuaries in the area.

===== Menin Gate Memorial =====
The Menin Gate Memorial to the Missing at Ypres	Image
The Menin Gate memorial was designed by Sir Reginald Blomfield with sculpture by Sir William Reid Dick and was unveiled by Field Marshal Lord Plumer on 24 July 1927. The site of the Menin Gate was chosen because it was from this location that hundreds of thousands of men set out for the Front Line: It was the start of one of the main roads leading from Ypres : the infamous "Menin Road". The Menin Gate combines a classical victory arch and mausoleum and inside and outside are carved the names of 54,896 officers and men of the forces of Australia, Canada, India, South Africa and the United Kingdom who died in the Ypres salient and who have no known grave. Just to underline the scale of the loss of life on the Salient it was soon realised that the Menin Gate was not big enough to record all the names involved so the decision was made to limit the names to those who had died from the outbreak of war to 15 August 1917. The names of the further 34,888 men who died from 16 August 1917 to the end of the war and again have no known grave are recorded on the Tyne Cot Memorial- see later entry. New Zealand casualties that died prior to 16 August 1917 are commemorated on memorials at Buttes New British Cemetery and Messines Ridge British Cemetery.	Menin Gate

===== Tyne Cot and New Zealand Memorial =====
Tyne Cot Memorial to the Missing, New Zealand Memorial (Tyne Cot Cemetery) and Tyne Cot Cemetery	Image
Tyne Cot was the name given by the Northumberland Fusiliers to a barn which stood on the Passchendaele to Broodseinde road. This barn became the centre of several German blockhouses which were captured by 2nd Australian Division on 4 October 1917 during the advance on Passchendaele. One such pill box, being unusually large, was used as an advance dressing station. This pill box remains and serves as an Australian War Memorial and the Cross of Sacrifice has been placed on top of it. Tyne Cot is an enormous cemetery with 11,953 burials of which 8366 are unknown and the Tyne Cot Memorial lists those men whose names could not be fitted on the Menin Gate Memorial, some 34,888 names. The cemetery was designed by Sir Herbert Baker. The Tyne Cot Memorial dedicated to New Zealanders who have no known grave forms the north-eastern boundary of the Cemetery. The sculptural work on this memorial was carried out by Frederick Victor Blundstone. The circular apse in the centre of the Memorial records the names of 1,176 New Zealanders killed in the Passchendaele area but who have no known grave. The names are recorded on eight panels. The inscription on the cross built upon the largest of the three pillboxes reads "THIS WAS THE TYNE COT BLOCKHOUSE CAPTURED BY THE 3RD AUSTRALIAN DIVISION 4TH OCTOBER 1917"	

===== Messines Ridge (New Zealand) Memorial =====
Messines Ridge (New Zealand) Memorial	Image
This Memorial, shown here, is situated within Messines Ridge British Cemetery. Messines (now Mesen) was considered a strong strategic position, not only because of its height above the plain below, but also the extensive system of cellars under the convent known as the 'Institution Royale'. The memorial is dedicated to the officers and men of the New Zealand Division and their part in the battles on the Messines Ridge in June 1917. The memorial, designed by Charles Holden, is located on the south-western edge of Messines village, on the Rue des Neo-Zeelandais. It lists 827 officers and men of the New Zealand Expeditionary Force with no known grave who died in or near Messines in 1917 and 1918. The land on which the cemetery and memorial were constructed had been the site of a mill (the Moulin d'Hospice) belonging to the Institute Royal de Messines (a Belgian orphanage and school, itself formerly a Benedictine abbey). The mill dated from 1445, but was destroyed during the war, with the memorial erected where the mill once stood. Messines was taken from the 1st Cavalry Division by the German 26th Division on 31 October-1 November 1914 and it was not until the Battle of Messines on 7 June 1917 that it was retaken by the New Zealand Division. On 10–11 April 1918, the village fell into German hands once more after a stubborn defence by the South African Brigade, but was retaken for the last time on 28–29 September 1918. The inscription at the centre of the memorial reads "Here are recorded the names of officers and men of NEW ZEALAND who fell in or near Messines in 1917 and 1918 and whose graves are known only to God" The names are shown on the walls to the right and left of the central inscription.	New Zealand Memorial Messines Ridge

===== New Zealand Memorial in Buttes Cemetery =====
The New Zealand Memorial in Buttes New British Cemetery and near Polygon Wood Cemetery	Image
Buttes New British Cemetery is situated some 8 km east of Ypres. Polygon Wood is a large wood south of the village of Zonnebeke which was completely devastated in the war. The wood was cleared by Commonwealth troops at the end of October 1914, given up on 3 May 1915, taken again at the end of September 1917 by Australian troops, evacuated in the Battles of the Lys, and finally retaken by the 9th (Scottish) Division on 28 September 1918. On the Butte itself is the Battle Memorial of the 5th Australian Division, who captured it on 26 September 1917. Polygon Wood Cemetery is an irregular front-line cemetery made between August 1917 and April 1918, and used again in September 1918. A walled avenue leads from Polygon Wood Cemetery, past the Cross of Sacrifice, to the Buttes New British Cemetery. This burial ground was made after the Armistice when a large number of graves (almost all of 1917, but in a few instances of 1914, 1916 and 1918) were brought in from the battlefields of Zonnebeke. There are now 2,108 Commonwealth servicemen of the First World War buried or commemorated in Buttes New British Cemetery. 1,677 of the burials are unidentified but special memorials are erected to 35 casualties known or believed to be buried among them. The Buttes New British Cemetery (New Zealand) Memorial, which stands in Buttes New British Cemetery, commemorates 378 officers and men of the New Zealand Division who died in the Polygon Wood sector between September 1917 and May 1918, and who have no known grave. The cemeteries and memorial were designed by Charles Holden.	Buttes New British Cemetery (New Zealand) Memorial

===== Ploegsteert Memorial =====
The Memorial to the Missing at Ploegsteert	Image
Ploegsteert lies just inside the Belgian-French border, 13 kilometres south of Ypres and the Memorial to the Missing there commemorates 11,447 officers and men of the United Kingdom and South African Forces who died on the northern Western Front outside the Ypres Salient and who have no known grave. It was unveiled on 7 June 1931 by the Duke of Brabant. The memorial was the work of the architect Harold Chalton Bradshaw, with sculpture by Gilbert Ledward and comprises a circular temple with pillars guarded by two lions, one of which embodies stern defiance and the other serenity. Ledward's lions are quite magnificent and measure 198 x 482.5 x 157.5 cm. They are mounted on bases 90 cm high. Ledward also designed two coats of arms, carved in relief and placed on the exterior wall of the memorial. The names of the missing are inscribed on panels on the interior surfaces of Bradshaw's circular double colonnade and the names of the various battles which took place in the area are inscribed on the exterior walls. The Memorial stands within the Berkshire CWGC Cemetery Extension, and on the other side of the road is Hyde Park Corner CWGC Cemetery. Incidentally Ploegsteert Wood is where Lieutenant Bruce Bairnsfather drew his first war cartoons and where the legendary 'Old Bill' cartoon character was born. Two lions couchant on low plinths on either side of the entrance to the cemetery extension lead to the circular colonnaded memorial. One lion roars, the other gazes serenely into the distance.	Ploegsteert Memorial

=== Belgian municipal and parochial memorials ===
Most villages and towns in West Flanders have their own war memorials, either civil or parochial. These can be traced in this website.

=== Demarcation Stones ===
Name	Demarcation Stones/Borne du Front/Demarcatiepalen	Image
Demarcation Stones/Borne du Front/Demarcatiepalen	It was the French sculptor Paul Moreau-Vauthier who had the idea in 1920 of putting down a series of stone markers all along the front line as it was after the victory at the Second Battle of the Marne on 18 July 1918, this front line running from the North Sea to the Swiss border. The markers are carved from pink granite and are no more than one metre high. On the top of the demarcation stone is a laurel wreath surmounted by the helmet of whichever Army stopped the Germans at the point marked. Thus we see a British "tin-helmet" or a Belgian or French helmet. There are depictions of grenades and palms at each corner and a water bottle hanging from a strap on one side and on the other, again hanging from a strap, a gas mask case. The demarcation stones are inscribed "Ici fut arrete L'Envahisseur", "Here the invader was brought to a standstill" and "Hier werd de overweldiger tot staangebracht". Moreau-Vauthier's idea was endorsed by Henri Defert, president of the Touring Club of France who invited the Belgian Touring Club to join the project. A total of 240 markers were planned (28 in Belgium, 212 in France), of which 118 were erected (22 in Belgium, 96 in France) in the years between 1921 and 1927. In French these demarcation stones are known as "Borne du Front" and in Dutch as "Demarcatiepalen". Some stones have been destroyed over the intervening years but many still exist. Moreau-Vauthier died in 1936 in a car accident at Ruffigny near Niort in Deux-Sèvres, and is buried in Père Lachaise Cemetery in Paris. He had served in the French Army and seen action at Verdun The planned number of demarcation stones was never achieved as funds seem to have run dry and enthusiasm for the project had waned.	Demarcation stone No.12 at Stuivekenskerke

== Memorial carillons ==
Throughout the German invasion of Belgium, the heavy artillery fire destroyed many of the country's bell towers, many of which contained swinging bell sets, carillons, and other large bells. In the subsequent occupation, Belgian carillons fell completely silent. Germans would demand carillonneurs to continue ringing their instruments, but they often fled or refused. In other areas, occupiers banned the ringing of bells. To the allies, the destroyed and unused bells were highly publicized and romanticized in poetry and in propaganda. Writers described the bells as if they were in mourning, waiting for liberation to ring out again that peace has calmed the world. As a result of this romanticization, carillons were constructed in Flanders over time in the name of world peace and in memory of those who died during the war:

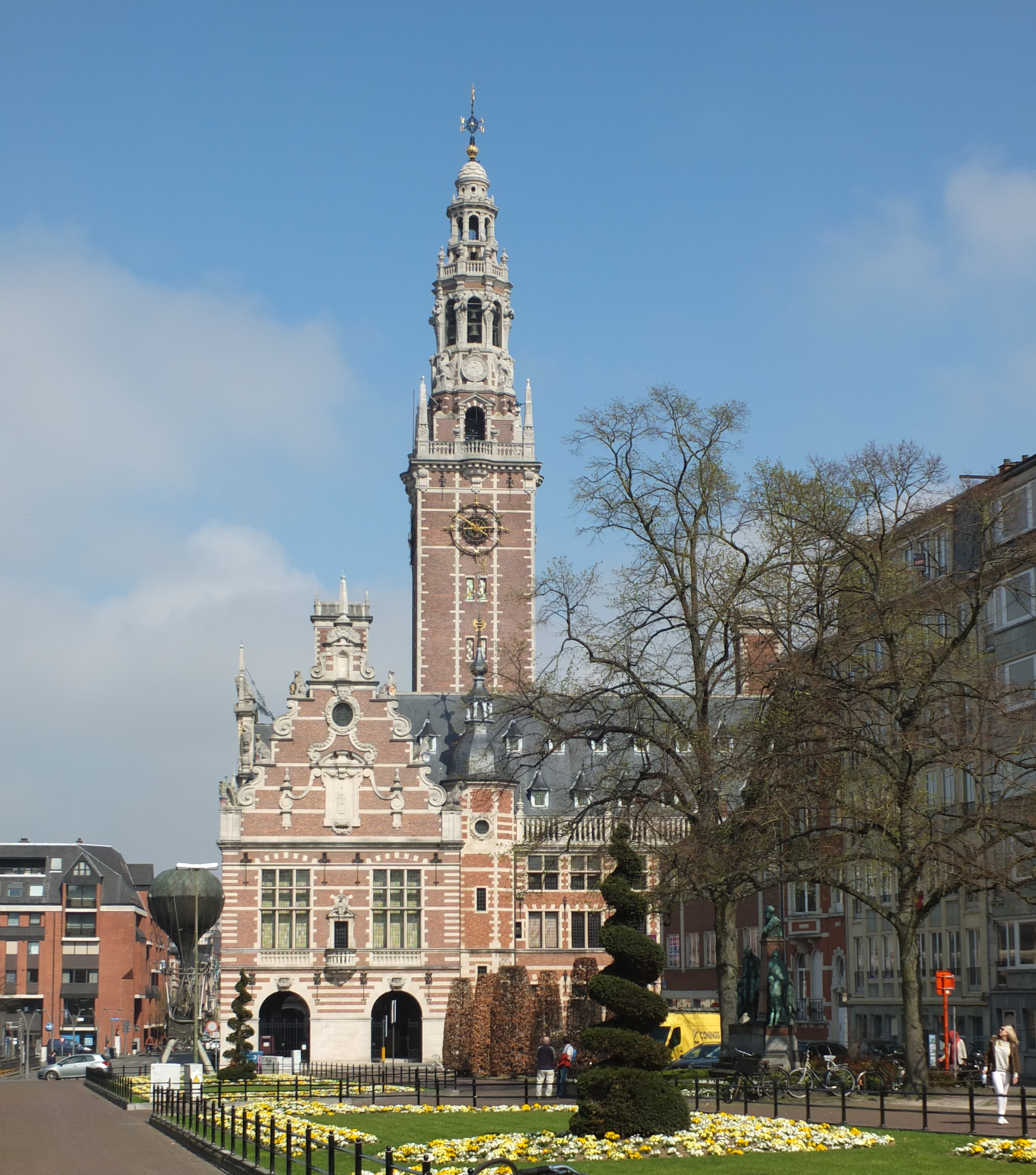
The tower of KU Leuven's library

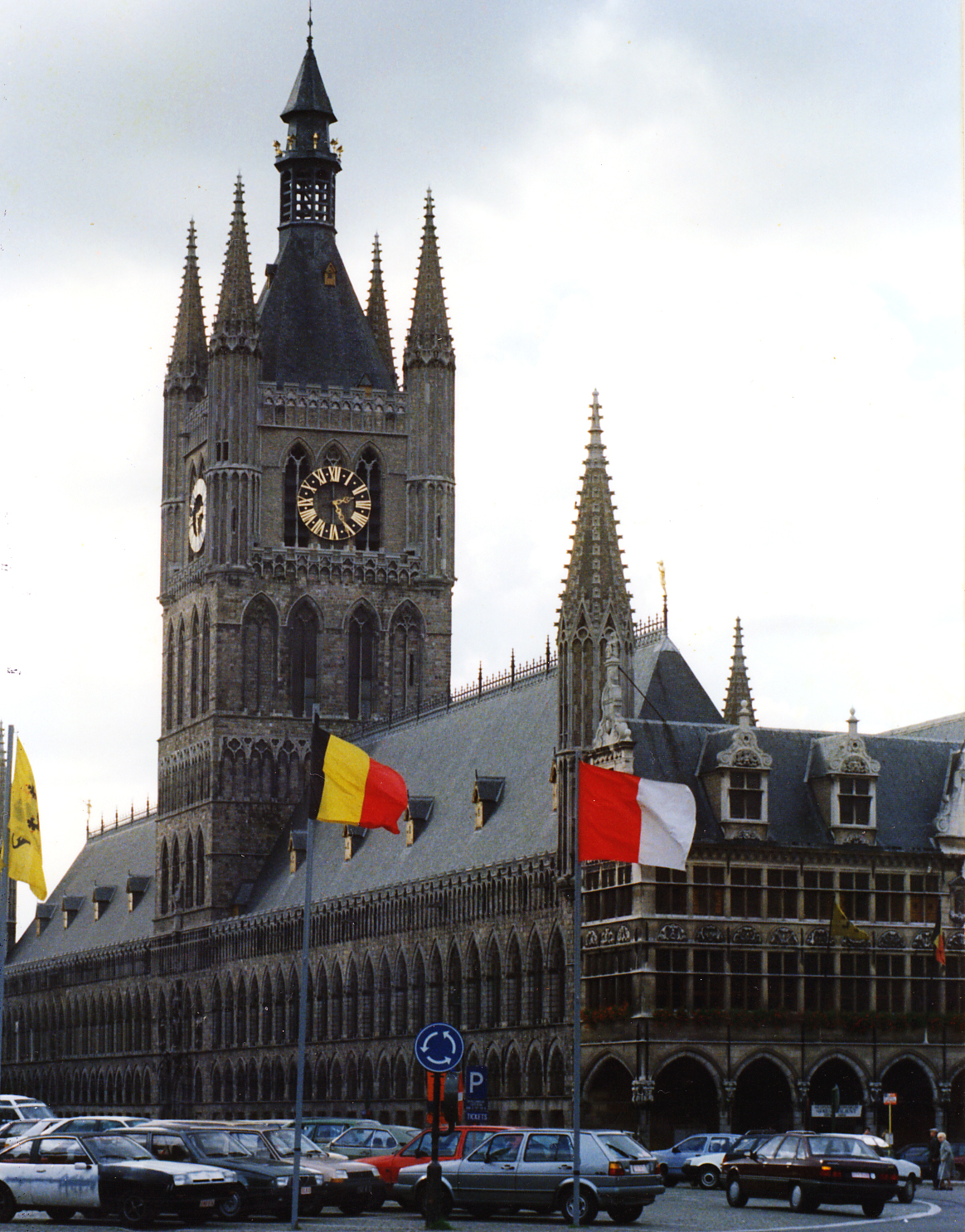
The tower of Ypres Cloth Hall

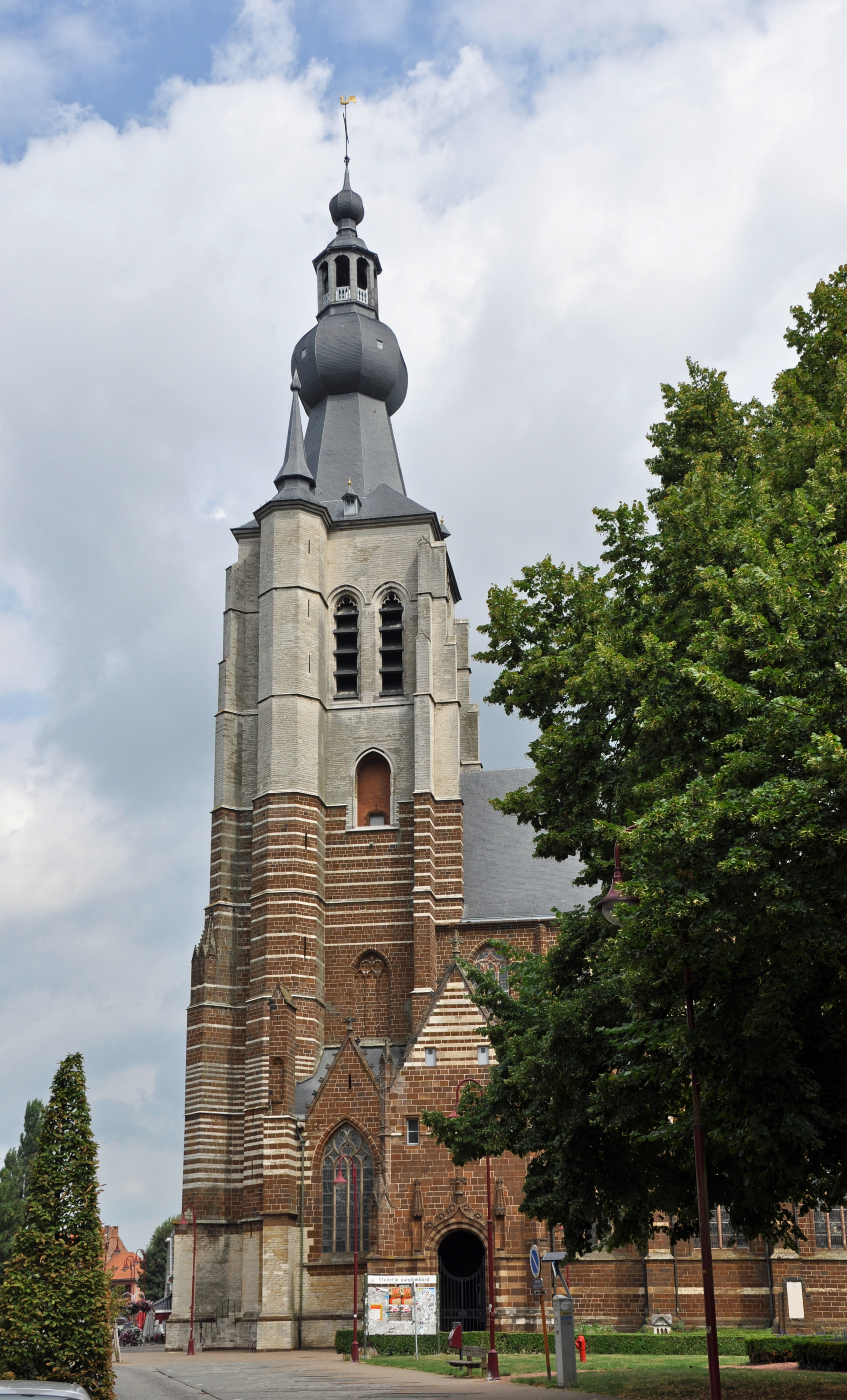
The tower of the Church of Our Lady in Aarschot

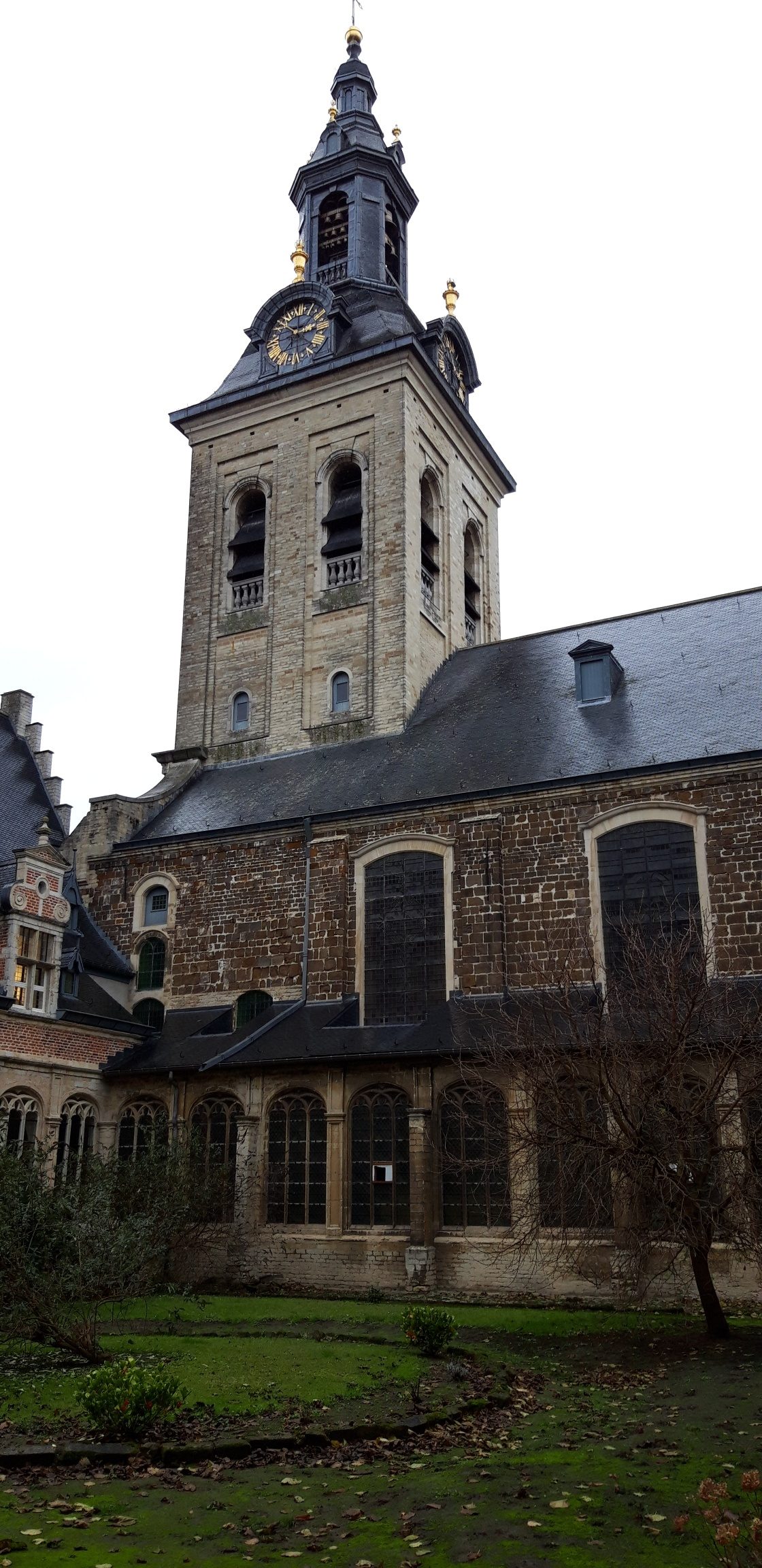
The tower of Park Abbey in Leuven
- In Leuven, 16 American engineering societies donated a carillon to the Academic libraries in memory of the American engineers who died in the war. It consisted of 48 bells, one for each U.S. state at the time (Hawaii and Alaska were U.S. territories). The carillon was completed and dedicated on 4 July 1928. It narrowly survived destruction in the Second World War, but fell into disrepair. American carillonneur Margo Halsted led a major restoration and expansion to 63 bells, which was realized in 1983.
- On 22 November 1914, during the First Battle of Ypres, the town's Cloth Hall came under heavy artillery fire and was destroyed, including its two carillons. In 1934, one year into the tower's meticulous reconstruction, bellfounder Marcel Michiels Jr. delivered a new, 49-bell carillon. Due to its unsatisfactory sound, it was retuned in 1963 by Petit & Fritsen. Because the tower houses the In Flanders Fields Museum since 1988, the carillon often supplements its music with bagpipes and trumpets.
- On 19 August 2018, the Church of Our Lady in Aarschot inaugurated a 51-bell carillon, one bell for each of the countries that had troops in Flanders during the First World War. Parts of old artillery shells were used in the carillon's bell bronze to symbolize reconciliation. The carillon was suggested by a church official, who remarked at city's lack of carillon compared to others in Flanders.
- During the Burning of Leuven, the city's carillon in St. Peter's Church was destroyed. The original site of this instrument, from 1730 to 1811, was in Park Abbey. In 2012, the cities of Leuven and Neuss, the latter from which most of the troops that destroyed Leuven came, began constructing a carillon, a replica of the original, for Park Abbey's empty tower. It was inaugurated on 11 November 2018, one century after the armistice.

== See also ==
- Flanders Field American Cemetery and Memorial
- List of World War I Memorials and Cemeteries in Alsace
- List of World War I memorials and cemeteries in Artois
- List of World War I memorials and cemeteries in Champagne-Ardennes
- List of World War I Memorials and Cemeteries in Lorraine
- List of World War I memorials and cemeteries in the area of the St Mihiel salient
- List of World War I memorials and cemeteries in the Somme
- List of World War I memorials and cemeteries in Verdun
