= Phoenicia Hotel =

Phoenicia Hotel may refer to:

- Phoenicia Hotel Beirut, Lebanon
- Hotel Phoenicia, Floriana, Malta
