= Nieuport Memorial =

Memorial in Nieuwpoort, Belgium

- Commonwealth War Graves Commission
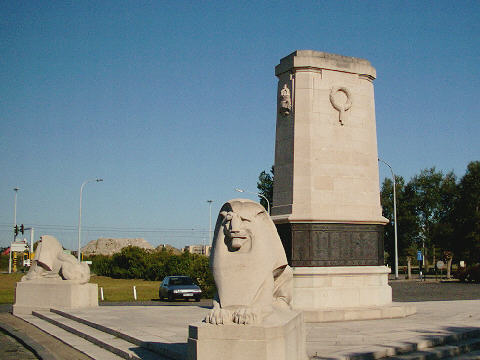
- The Nieuport Memorial and two of the three stone lions
- For British forces
- Unveiled: 1 July 1928
- Location: 51°08′13.64″N 02°45′20.20″E; Nieuwpoort, Belgium
- Designed by: William Bryce Binnie (architect); Charles Sargeant Jagger (sculptor)
- Here are recorded the names of 566 British officers and men who have no known grave. They fell in the Defence of Antwerp in October 1914 and later operations on the Belgian coast.

UNESCO World Heritage Site
- Official name: Funerary and memory sites of the First World War (Western Front)
- Type: Cultural
- Criteria: i, ii, vi
- Designated: 2023 (45th session)
- Reference no.: 1567-FL01

The British Nieuport Memorial is a First World War memorial, located in the Belgian port city of Nieuwpoort (French: Nieuport), which is at the mouth of the River Yser. The memorial lists 547 names of British officers and men with no known grave who were killed in the Siege of Antwerp in 1914 or in the defence of this part of the Western Front from June to November 1917. Those that fought in 1914 were members of the Royal Naval Division. The fighting in 1917, when XV Corps defended the line from Sint-Joris to the sea, included the German use of chemical weapons such as mustard gas and Blue Cross.

Designed by the Scottish architect William Bryce Binnie, the memorial is an 8-metre-high pylon of Euville stone, a limestone from Euville. The names of those commemorated are cast on bronze panels surrounding the base of the pylon. Three lions, carved by the British sculptor Charles Sargeant Jagger, stand guard at the corners of the memorial's triangular paved platform. Around the top of the bronze name panels is cast the words from Laurence Binyon's famous poem, "For the Fallen":

They shall grow not old, as we that are left grow old:
Age shall not weary them, nor the years condemn.
At the going down of the sun, and in the morning,
We will remember them.

The memorial was unveiled on 1 July 1928 by Sir George Macdonogh, a commissioner for the Imperial War Graves Commission (now Commonwealth War Graves Commission). Macdonogh had been a staff officer and general for the Directorate of Military Intelligence for most of the war, being appointed Adjutant-General to the Forces in September 1918.

The King Albert I Memorial, dedicated to both the King and his Belgian troops during the First World War, is located directly next to the Nieuport Memorial.

== See also ==
- List of World War I memorials and cemeteries in Flanders
