= Riversdale Colyer-Fergusson =

Recipient of the Victoria Cross

Acting Captain Riversdale Colyer-Fergusson VC
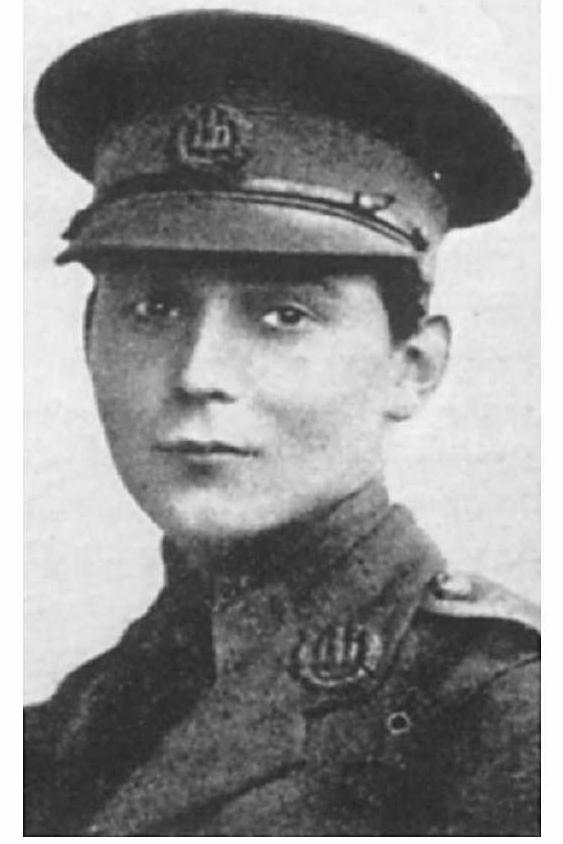
- Born: 18 February 1896; Portman Square, London, England
- Died: 31 July 1917 (aged 21); Pilckem Ridge, Bellewaarde, Belgium
- Burial place: Menin Road South Military Cemetery, Ypres, Belgium
- Military career
- Allegiance: United Kingdom
- Branch: British Army
- Service years: 1914–1917
- Rank: Captain
- Units: Northamptonshire Regiment
- Conflicts: World War I: Battle of Passchendaele; Battle of Pilckem Ridge †
- Awards: Victoria Cross

Captain Thomas Riversdale Colyer-Fergusson VC (18 February 1896 − 31 July 1917) was a British Army officer and an English recipient of the Victoria Cross (VC), the highest and most prestigious award for gallantry in the face of the enemy that can be awarded to British and Commonwealth forces.

== Early life and education ==
Born in London in February 1896 to Thomas Colyer Colyer Fergusson (later Sir Thomas Colyer Fergusson) of Ightham Mote and the late Beatrice Stanley, he was educated at Summer Fields and Harrow School before going up to Oriel College, Oxford.

== First World War ==
Colyer-Fergusson was 21 years old, and an acting captain in the 2nd Battalion, The Northamptonshire Regiment, British Army when performed the deed on 31 July 1917 during the Battle of Pilckem Ridge at Bellewaarde, Belgium which earned him the Victoria Cross. After performing the deed, Colyer-Fergusson died of a gunshot wound from a sniper shot.

For most conspicuous bravery, skilful leading and determination in attack. The tactical situation having developed contrary to expectation, it was not possible for his company to adhere to the original plan of deployments, and owing to the difficulties of the ground and to enemy wire, Captain Colyer Fergusson found himself with a Sergeant and five men only. He carried out the attack nevertheless, and succeeded in capturing the enemy trench and disposing of the garrison. His party was then threatened by a heavy counter-attack from the left front, but this attack he successfully resisted. During this operation, assisted by his Orderly only, he attacked and captured an enemy machine gun and turned it on the assailants, many of whom were killed and a large number driven into the hands of an adjoining British unit. Later, assisted only by his Serjeant, he again attacked and captured a second enemy machine gun, by which time he had been joined by other portions of his company, and was enabled to consolidate his position. The conduct of this officer throughout forms an amazing record of dash, gallantry and skill, for which no reward can be too great, having regard to the importance of the position won. This gallant officer was shortly afterwards killed by a sniper.

— The London Gazette," No. 30272, dated 4 September 1917

His Victoria Cross is part of the collection at the Museum of The Northamptonshire Regiment (48th & 58th Foot), Northampton, England and he is buried in Menin Road South Military Commonwealth War Graves Commission Cemetery. There is a memorial in his memory in St Peter's Church, Ightham, Kent. His name also appears on the war memorial at Ifield Church, Gravesend, Kent.

The VC medal is presently (July 2017) on loan to the National Trust, and on display at Ightham Mote, his family home.

== Bibliography ==
- Snelling, Stephen (2012) [1998]. Passchendaele 1917. VCs of the First World War. The History Press. ISBN 978-0752476667.
- Ingleton, Roy (2011). Kent VCs. Pen and Sword Books. ISBN 978-1848844094.
