= Menin Road South Military Commonwealth War Graves Commission Cemetery =

WWI CWGC cemetery in Ypres, Belgium

Menin Road South Military Cemetery
- Commonwealth War Graves Commission
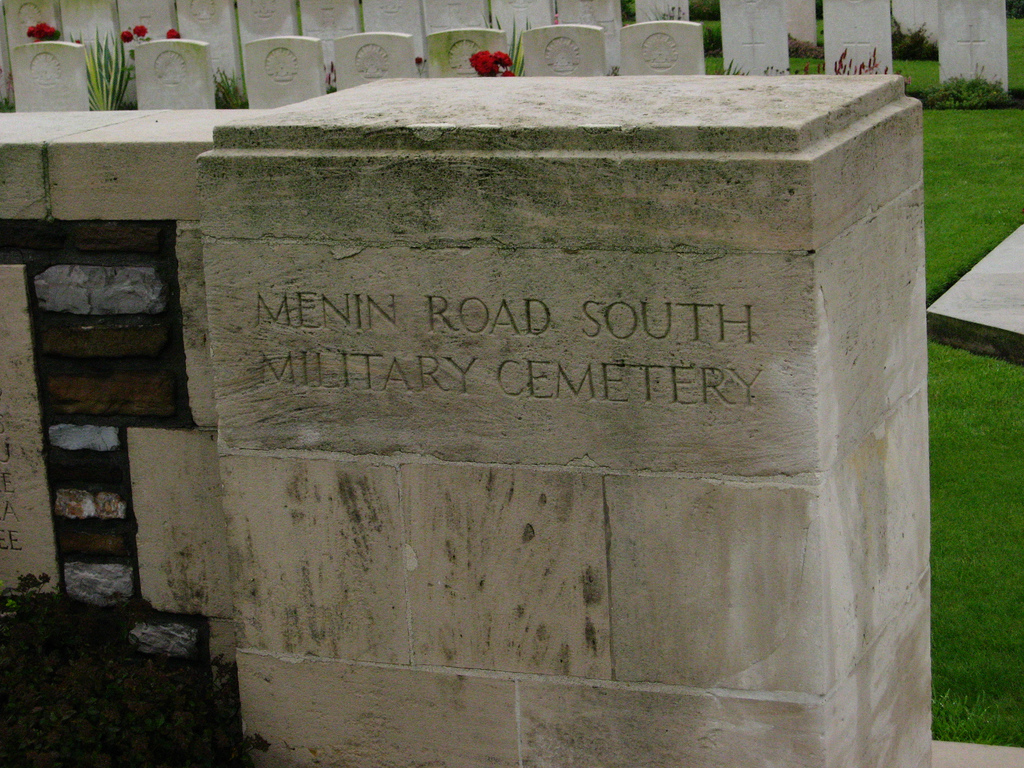
- Used for those deceased 1916–1918
- Established: January 1916
- Location: 50°50′58″N 02°54′16″E near Ypres, West Flanders, Belgium
- Designed by: Sir Reginald Blomfield
- Total burials: 1658
- Unknowns: 119

Burials by nation
- Allied Powers: United Kingdom: 1125; Canada: 148; Australia: 267; New Zealand: 52; Central Powers: Germany: 1; Unknown: 65

Burials by war
- World War I: 1658
- Statistics source: WW1Cemeteries.com and CWGC

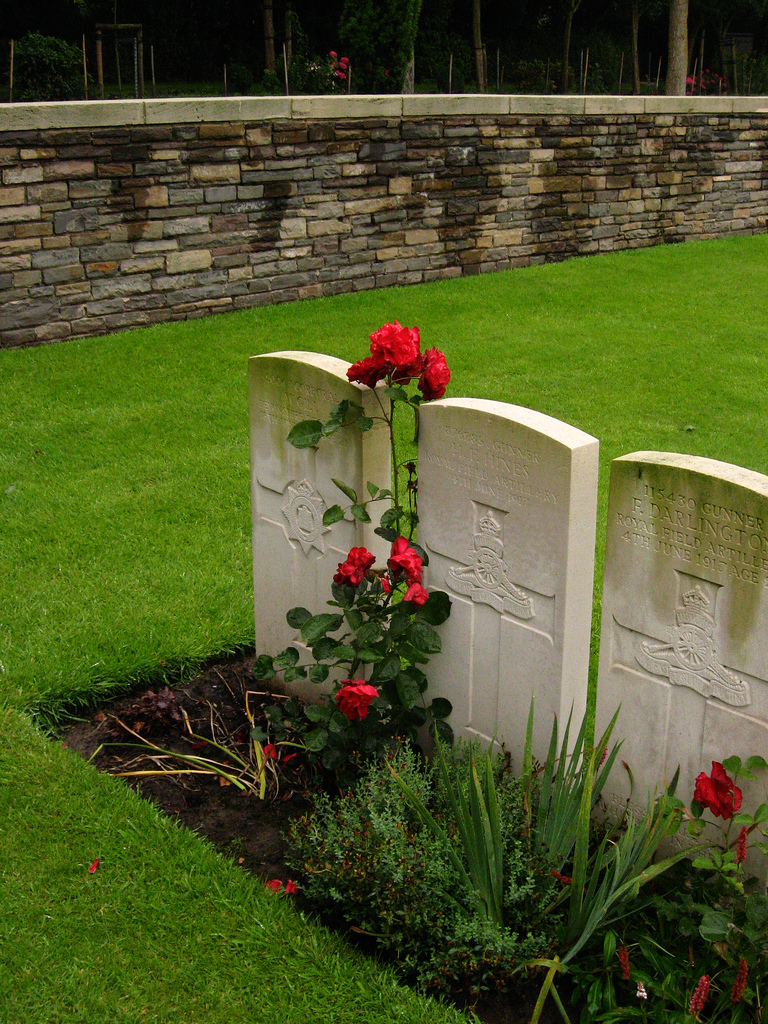
Menin Road South cemetery

Menin Road South Military Cemetery is a Commonwealth War Graves Commission burial ground for the dead of the First World War located near Ypres, on the Western Front.

The cemetery grounds were assigned to the United Kingdom in perpetuity by King Albert I of Belgium in recognition of the sacrifices made by the British Empire in the defence and liberation of Belgium during the war.

== Foundation ==
The cemetery lies to one side of the infamous Menin Road. The road ran from Ypres to the front line at a point which effectively remained static for almost the entire war. The cemetery therefore remained an Allied possession throughout the war.

It was founded in January 1916 and was used until summer 1918. After the Armistice, the neighbouring Menin Road North cemetery was concentrated into this cemetery, with additional concentration from single battlefield graves from the front itself.

The cemetery was designed by Sir Reginald Blomfield.

== Special memorials ==
The cemetery has 79 "special memorials". In the form of stone obelisks or just headstones with special notations, they record the names of 24 soldiers known or believed to be buried in the cemetery and a further 54 whose graves were lost in later fighting or could not be found after the war. As these are known casualties (not "missing"), they are included in the total figure for burials in the cemetery and are not recorded on the Menin Gate.

== Notable graves ==
The cemetery holds the grave of acting-Captain Thomas Riversdale Colyer-Fergusson, of the Northamptonshire Regiment who was awarded the Victoria Cross, the highest award for valour "in the face of the enemy" in the Commonwealth.
