= William Binnie (architect) =

Scottish architect

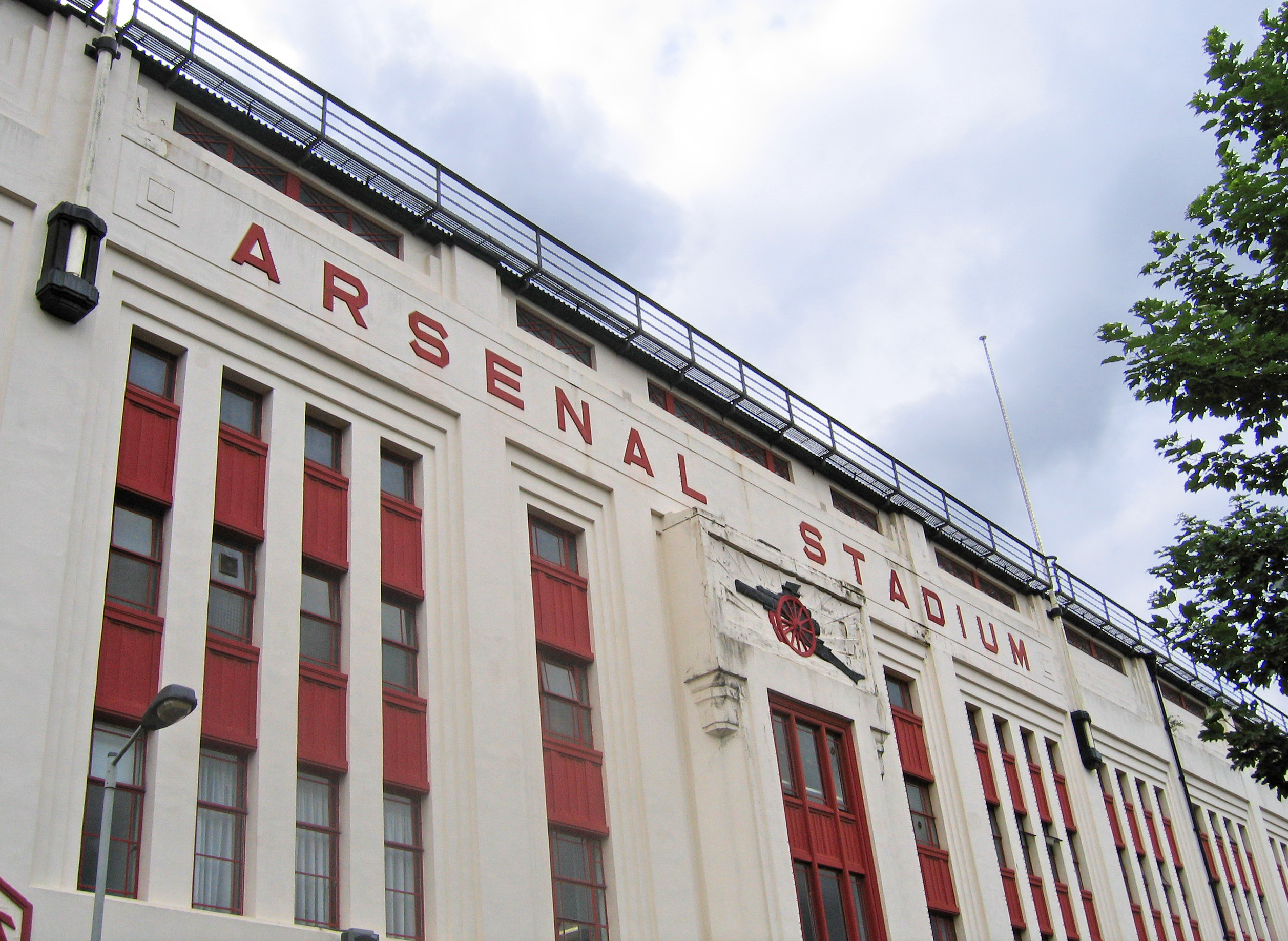
The Art Deco East Stand of Arsenal Stadium

William Bryce Binnie FRIBA (1 July 1886 – 1963) was a Scottish architect. He trained in Scotland but practiced initially in New York and then London. During the First World War he served with the Black Watch and was decorated for bravery. Afterwards he worked for the Imperial War Graves Commission until 1927, when he returned to private practice in London.

== Biography ==
Binne was born at Kingscavil, by Linlithgow. From 1904 he was articled to architect Robert Bryden in Glasgow, moving to John James Burnet's office after Bryden's death in 1906. Between 1908 and 1910 Binnie studied at the Glasgow School of Art, where he was awarded a gold medal and a travel scholarship, which he used to spend a year Italy.

In 1910 he moved to New York City to work at Warren & Wetmore, where amongst other buildings, he worked on some of the detailings of the interior of Grand Central Station. In 1913 he returned to Britain to work as a draughtsman under London architect Leonard Martin.

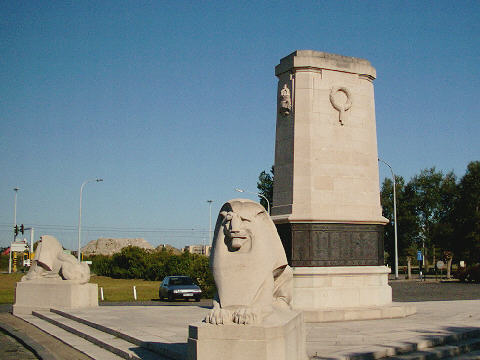
Nieuport Memorial, Belgium

Binnie served in the Army during World War I, eventually attaining the rank of major in the Black Watch (Royal Highlanders). His actions gained him the Military Cross "for conspicuous gallantry" in 1916 when he took command of a company which had lost its officers. His citation notes that "Though buried by a shell early in the morning, he never ceased his fine work". In 1917 he was awarded a Bar to his decoration, and a second Bar in 1918 when he again took the place of an officer who had been killed.

At the close of the war he took up a position as assistant architect at the Imperial War Graves Commission (now Commonwealth War Graves Commission), and was promoted to deputy director in 1920. He spent much of the post-war years in France and Belgium designing memorials, including the one at Nieuwpoort in West Flanders. He was admitted to the Royal Institute of British Architects (RIBA) in 1919 as an Associate, and became a Fellow in 1925. His nominators for fellowship were Sir Herbert Baker, Sir Reginald Blomfield, and Sir Edwin Lutyens, all of whom had been prominent in the work of the War Graves Commission.

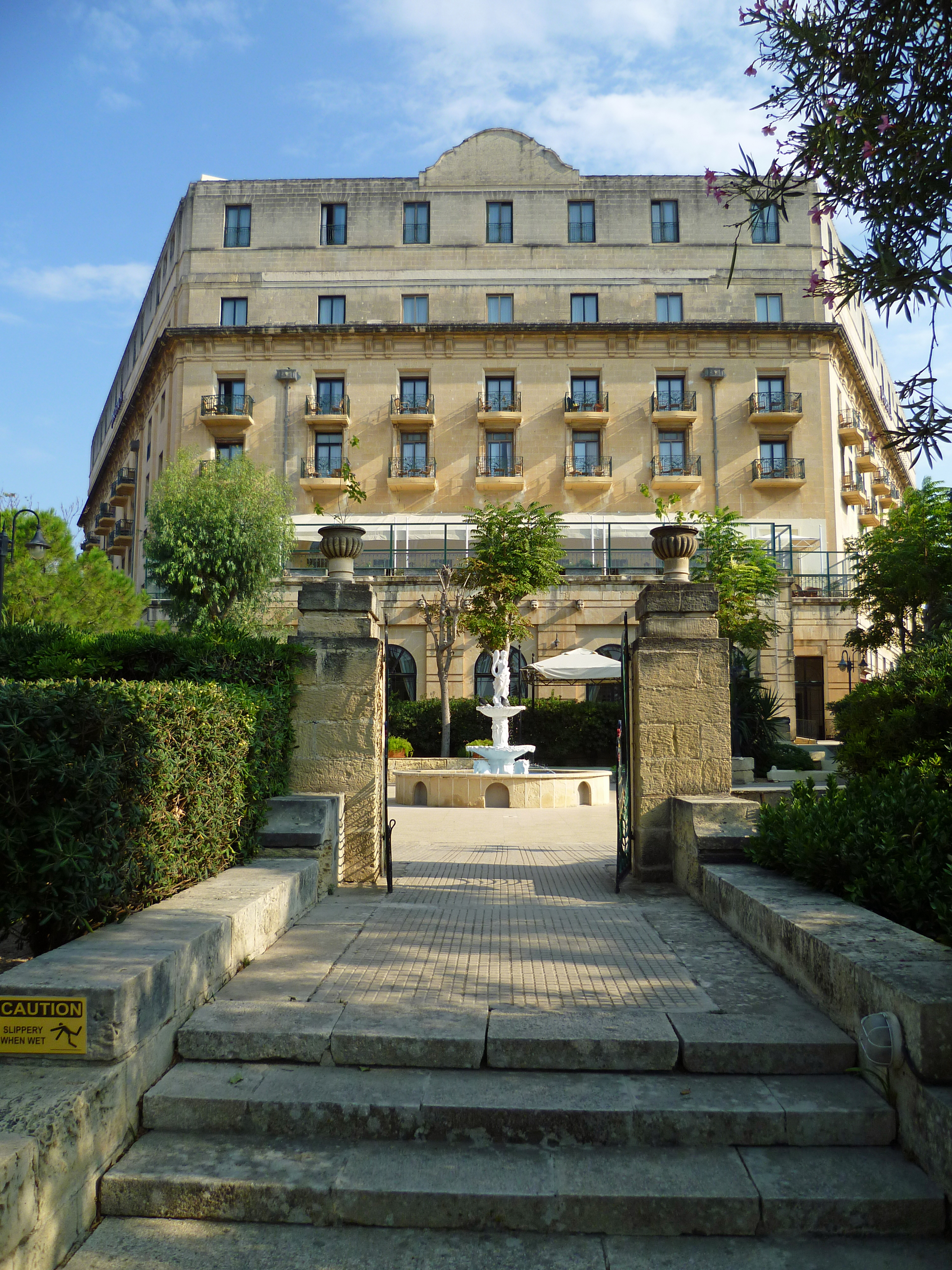
Hotel Phoenicia, Floriana, Malta

In 1927 he returned to London to set up a practice with fellow Scot Claude Ferrier, who was already established in Westminster. The association lasted until Ferrier's accidental death in 1935, after which Binnie continued the practice alone. His work in this later period, in an Art Deco style, included the design of 81 New Bond Street and an extension to the National Temperance Hospital (now part of University College Hospital). The East Stand of Arsenal Stadium, Highbury, (1936) was designed by Ferrier and Binnie and is now a Grade II listed building. He also undertook commissions in Malta, including the Hotel Phoenicia at Floriana (1939) and The Farsons Brewery (1950), designed with Lewis V. Farrugia.
