= Hotel Phoenicia =

The Phoenicia Malta

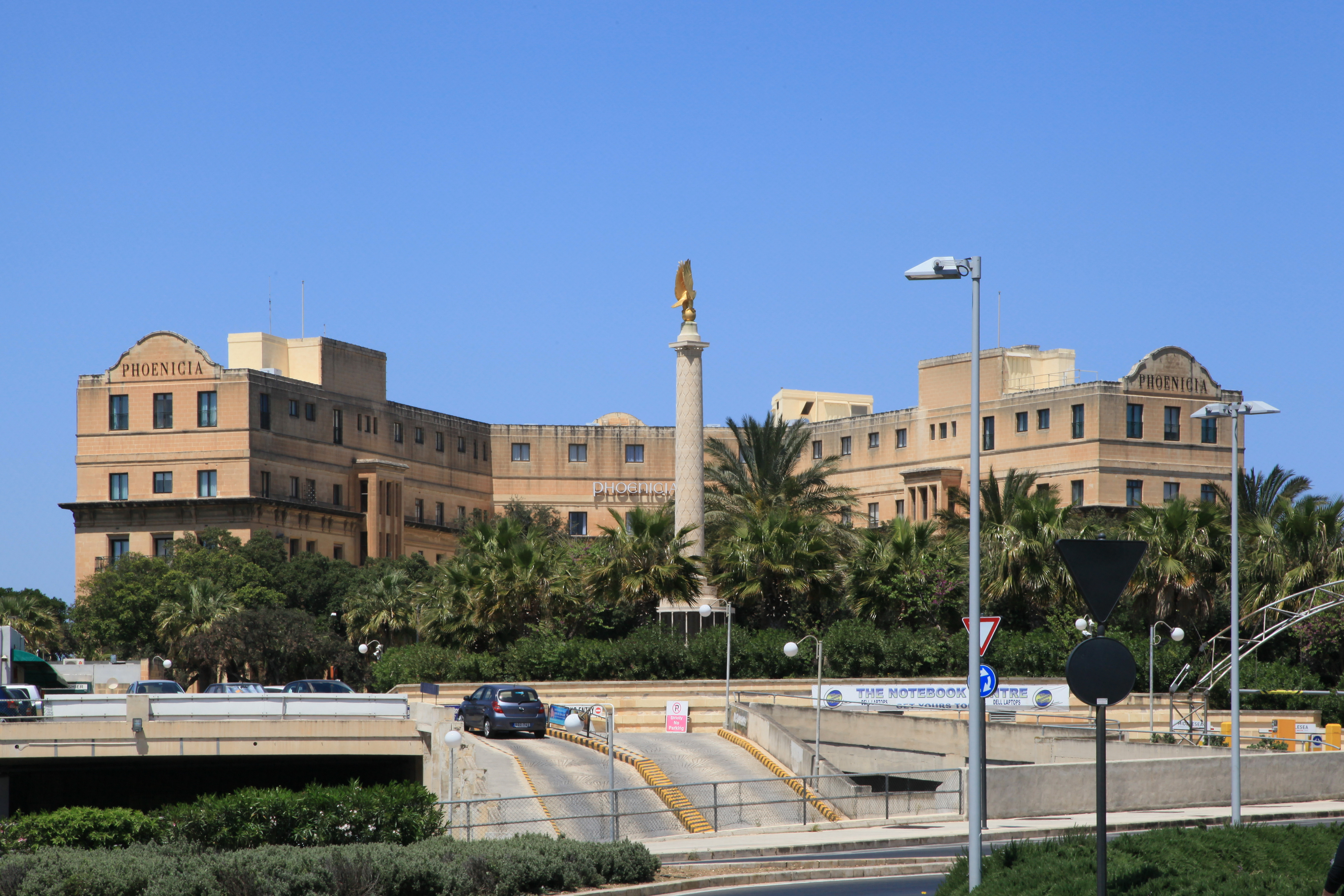
- The Phoenicia Malta with the Malta Memorial in the foreground, pictured in 2014 (before further floors were built)
- Interactive map of the The Phoenicia Malta area
- Former names: Le Méridien Phoenicia

General information
- Status: Intact
- Type: Hotel
- Architectural style: Art Deco
- Location: Floriana, Malta
- Coordinates: 35°53′43.8″N 14°30′25.3″E
- Construction started: 1936
- Completed: April 1948
- Opened: 3 November 1947

Technical details
- Material: Limestone
- Grounds: 7.5 acres (3.0 ha)

Design and construction
- Architect: William Binnie

Other information
- Number of rooms: 132

Website
- www.phoeniciamalta.com

The Phoenicia Malta, formerly called the Le Méridien Phoenicia, is a 5-star hotel in Floriana, Malta. The Art Deco hotel was built in the 1930s, and was opened in November 1947. It is regarded as one of the top hotels in Malta. The hotel had one of the earliest restaurants of good standards in Malta in the 1950s. It had three floors originally, but further floors were built along the years.

== Location ==
The Phoenicia Malta is located just outside the capital city of Valletta, close to the Triton Fountain and City Gate. It was built upon a place-of-arms which was part of the outworks of the fortifications of Valletta.

== History ==
=== Planning ===
Plans to build a “first-class” hotel outside Valletta goes back to February 1902, when public tenders where issued by the public works. However nothing materialised until after WWI. In February 1923, the Minister for Public Works Antonio Dalli discreetly received a written proposal, by Antonio Cassar Torregiani, for the site to be leased to him in order to build a hotel. However, the minister was of the opinion that the public land and such project should be subject to a competitive opportunity among architects.

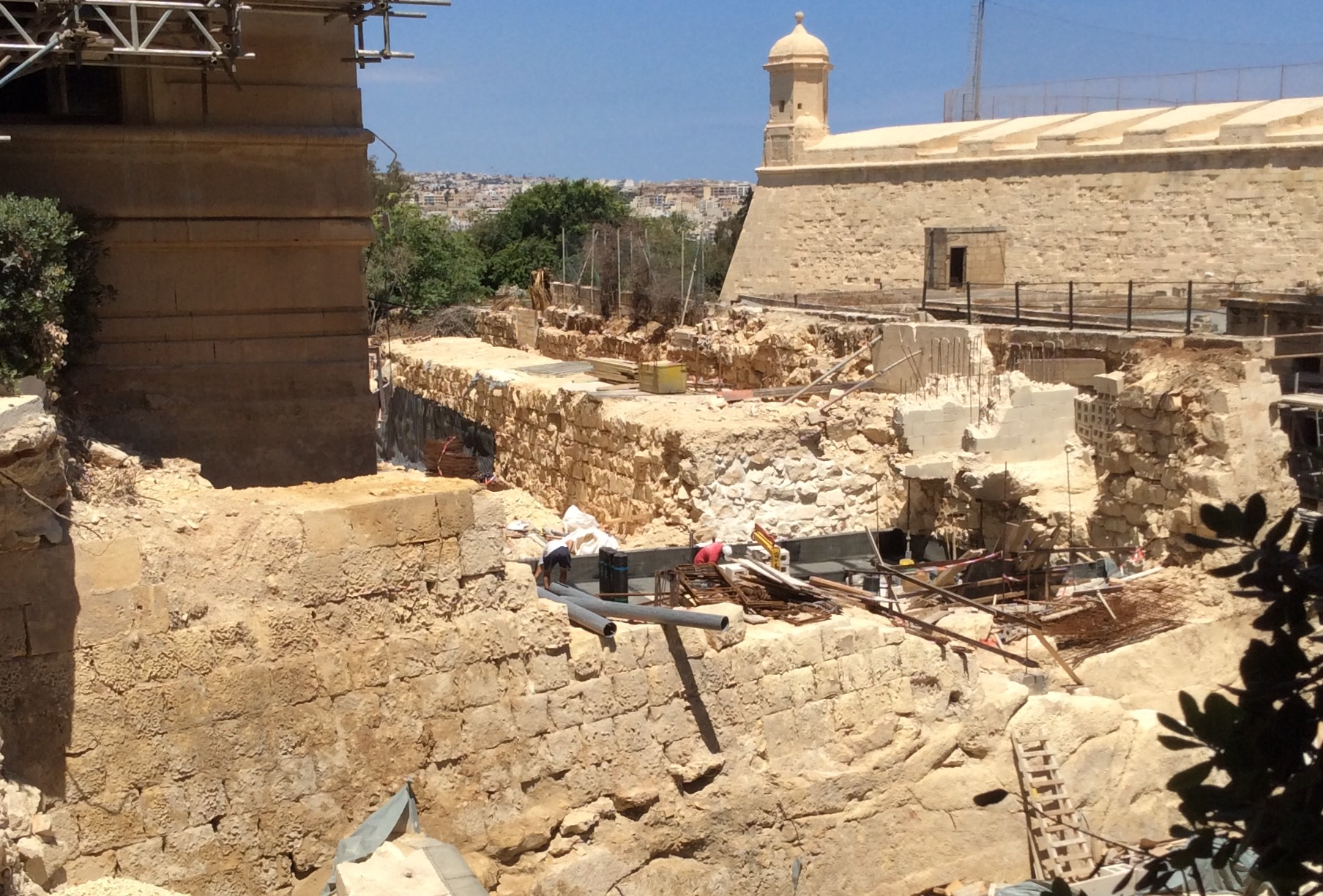
Hotel grounds findings of the fortifications during renovation. The caponier according to the SCH.

In October 1924, under the new Minister for Public Works Giovanni Adami, a public notice was issued for numerous projects in the surrounding of the entrance from and to Valletta, including the building of a 200 beds modern style hotel. The tender was open to the public with strict guidelines for eligibility under British conditions. Maltese architects protested against the inclusion of British architects for local projects, something which was discussed in the Maltese National Assembly.

The Prime Minister Gerald Strickland and his wife Margaret were the minds behind the Valletta entrance project. The government leased the land for the hotel for 150 years. The intention was to have a place where European dignitaries could stay in the best of comfort in the centre of the island. For this reason, the outer glacis of the fortifications was identified as an ideal site.

=== Construction ===
The project began in 1935, and a year later, the Scottish architect William Binnie was commissioned to design the building. Construction began soon after, and it was almost complete by 1939. With the outbreak of World War II, the finished parts of the hotel were requisitioned by the British military to be used by the Royal Air Force personnel. On 27 April 1942, the hotel suffered extensive damage when it was hit by aerial bombardment. Reconstruction of the damaged parts began in 1944, and was fully complete in April 1948.

=== In use and refurbishments ===
The hotel officially opened on 3 November 1947. The opening ceremony was attended by Lady Margaret Strickland, Archbishop Mikiel Gonzi and Governor Francis Campbell. Some of the official functions relating to Malta's independence in 1964 were held at the Phoenicia. The hotel was acquired by Charles Forte in 1966, and it was refurbished between 1968 and 1970. Further modifications, including the construction of an additional floor, were made between 1990 and 1994.

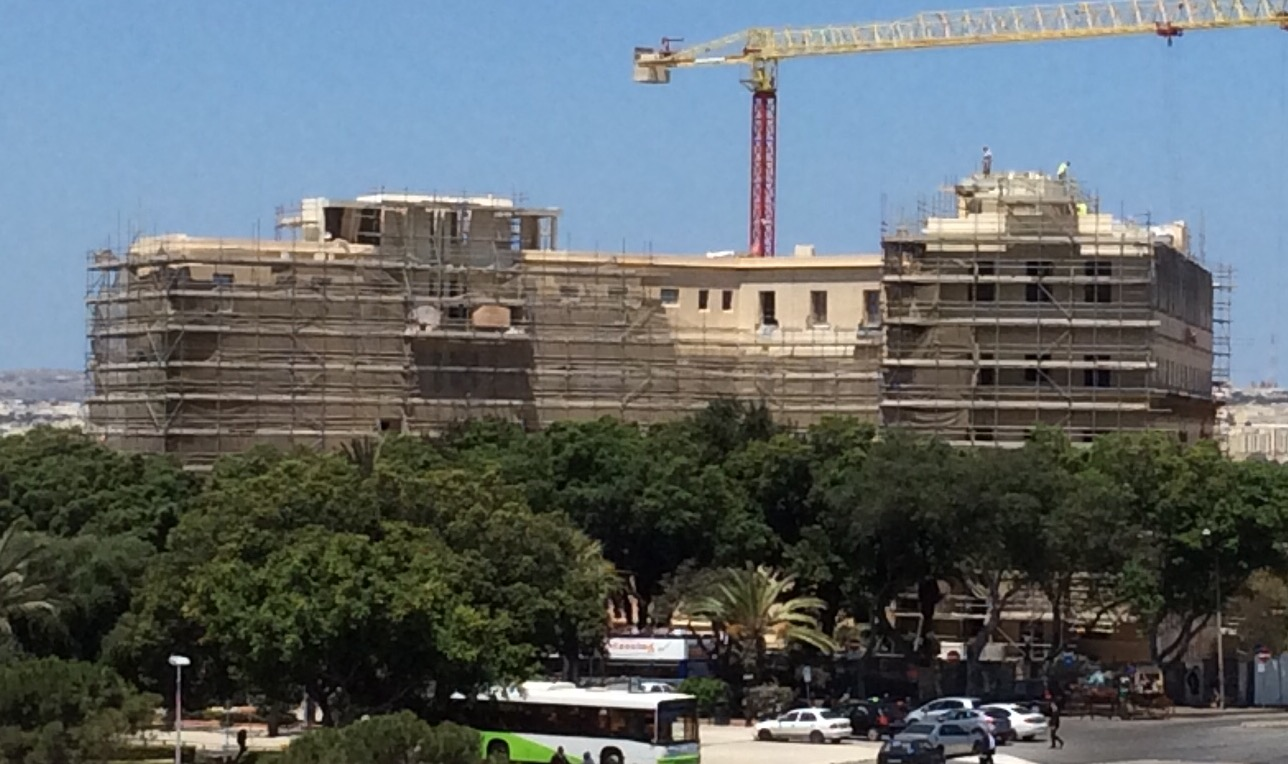
Under restoration and construction of further floors

On 8 November 1997, the hotel was rebranded as Le Méridien Phoenicia, following Forte's acquisition of Le Méridien. It was put on sale in late 2006, and was purchased by the Irish company Heuston Hospitality in 2007, who renamed the hotel back to Phoenicia Hotel Malta. In June 2014 the hotel was purchased by Hazeldane Group.

The hotel was closed during a €15 million restoration and refurbishment. The refurbishment was expected to be complete by March 2016, but works were ready by 2018. At this point it was reopened.

Throughout the years, the Phoenicia has hosted a number of distinguished guests, including Queen Elizabeth II, Prince Philip, Edwina Mountbatten, Alec Guinness, Jeffrey Hunter, Gérard Depardieu, Oliver Reed, Derek Jacobi, Joaquin Phoenix and Arnold Schwarzenegger.

== Architecture ==
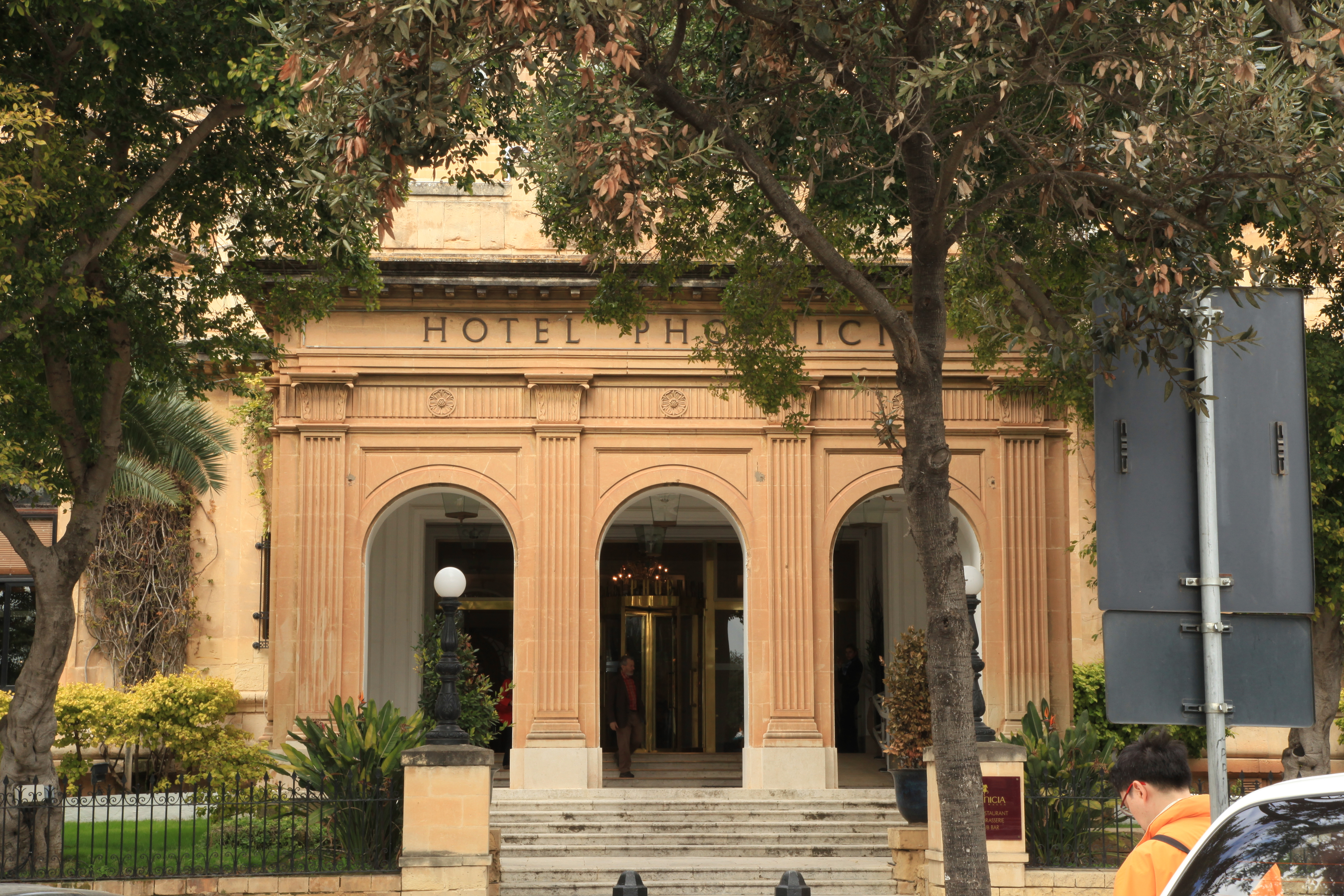
Main entrance to Hotel Phoenicia

The Phoenicia Malta is an example of Art Deco architecture. It is built in Maltese limestone and has a number of elements typical of Maltese architecture. The building has a chevron shape, with a central circular Palm Court Hall giving on to the restaurant and then the terrace. Its grounds contain extensive gardens, amounting to some 7½ acres. It overlooks the bastion walls of Valletta.

The building is scheduled by the Malta Environment and Planning Authority.

== Popular media ==
- The Hotel Phoenicia is the setting for a meeting spot in the first chapter of Nicholas Monsarrat's The Kappillan of Malta.
