= Nieuwpoort–Dunkirk Canal =

Coordinates: 51°03′N 2°22′E

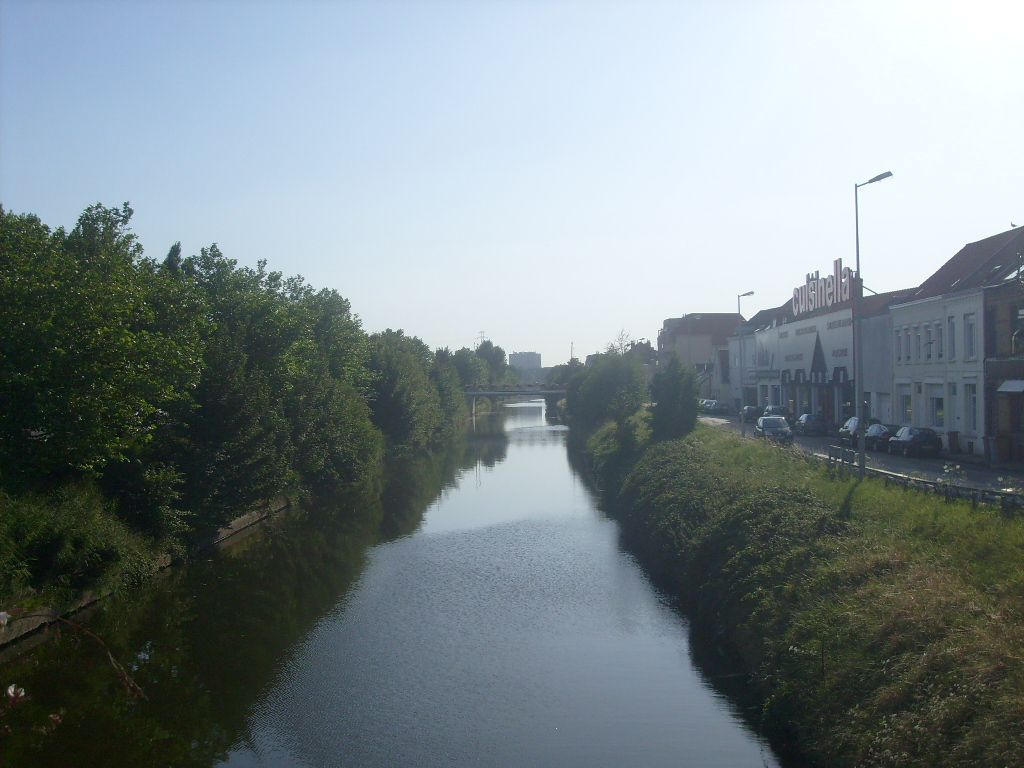

Specifications
- Length: in Belgium: 18.7 km (11.6 mi) in France:13.3 km (8.3 mi)
- Total rise: 32 km (20 mi)
- Status: open

History
- Construction began: 1630

Geography
- Direction: East/West
- Start point: Nieuwpoort, Belgium
- End point: Dunkirk
- Connects to: Ganzepoot; Bourbourg; Bergues

The Nieuwpoort–Dunkirk Canal (Dutch Kanaal Nieuwpoort–Duinkerke, French Canal Nieuport–Dunkerque) is a canal which links the Belgian coastal town of Nieuwpoort with the French port Dunkirk. The Nieuwpoort–Dunkirk Canal forms an extension of the Plassendale–Nieuwpoort Canal, and runs for 32 kilometres (20 mi) pretty much parallel to the coast line, within two to four kilometers from the sea.

The canal starts at the so-called Ganzepoot lock complex at the mouth of the Yser in Nieuwpoort, where it connects the Yser, the North Sea and the Plassendale–Nieuwpoort Canal. The canal first circles around the old city center and then turns eastward, past the village of Wulpen in the municipality of Koksijde. Then the canal turns inland towards the city of Veurne, where it connects with the Lovaart Canal. The canal goes around Veurne, and then bends back towards the shoreline by Adinkerke. After almost 19 kilometres (12 mi) in Belgium, the canal continues into France, passing the communes of Bray-Dunes and Zuydcoote. In Dunkirk it connects again to the North Sea where the Nieuwpoort–Dunkirk Canal finally ends in linkups with the Bourbourg and Bergues canals.

The Plassendale–Nieuwpoort–Veurne–Dunkirk Canal was built around 1630; it connects with other canals built in that period, the Ghent–Bruges Canal (1613), and Bruges–Oostend Canal (1618).

The Canal de Furnes is the French name for the portion of the Nieuwpoort–Dunkirk Canal running in France, from Dunkirk to the Belgian border town of Veurne (Fr. Furnes). The Belgian border is at PK13.

== See also ==
- List of canals in Belgium
- List of canals in France
