= Karel Aubroeck =

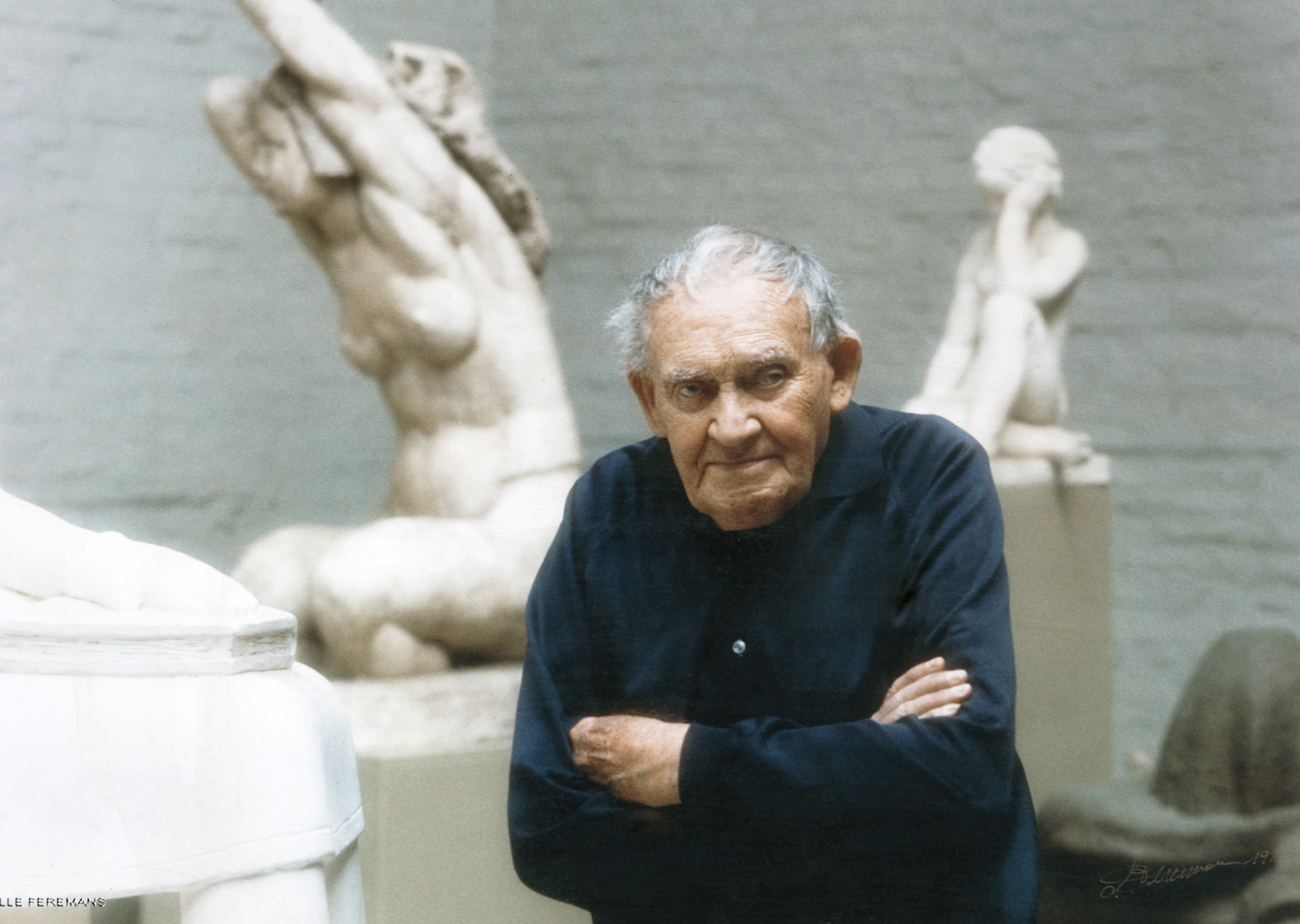
Aubroeck in 1984, photo: Lucille Feremans

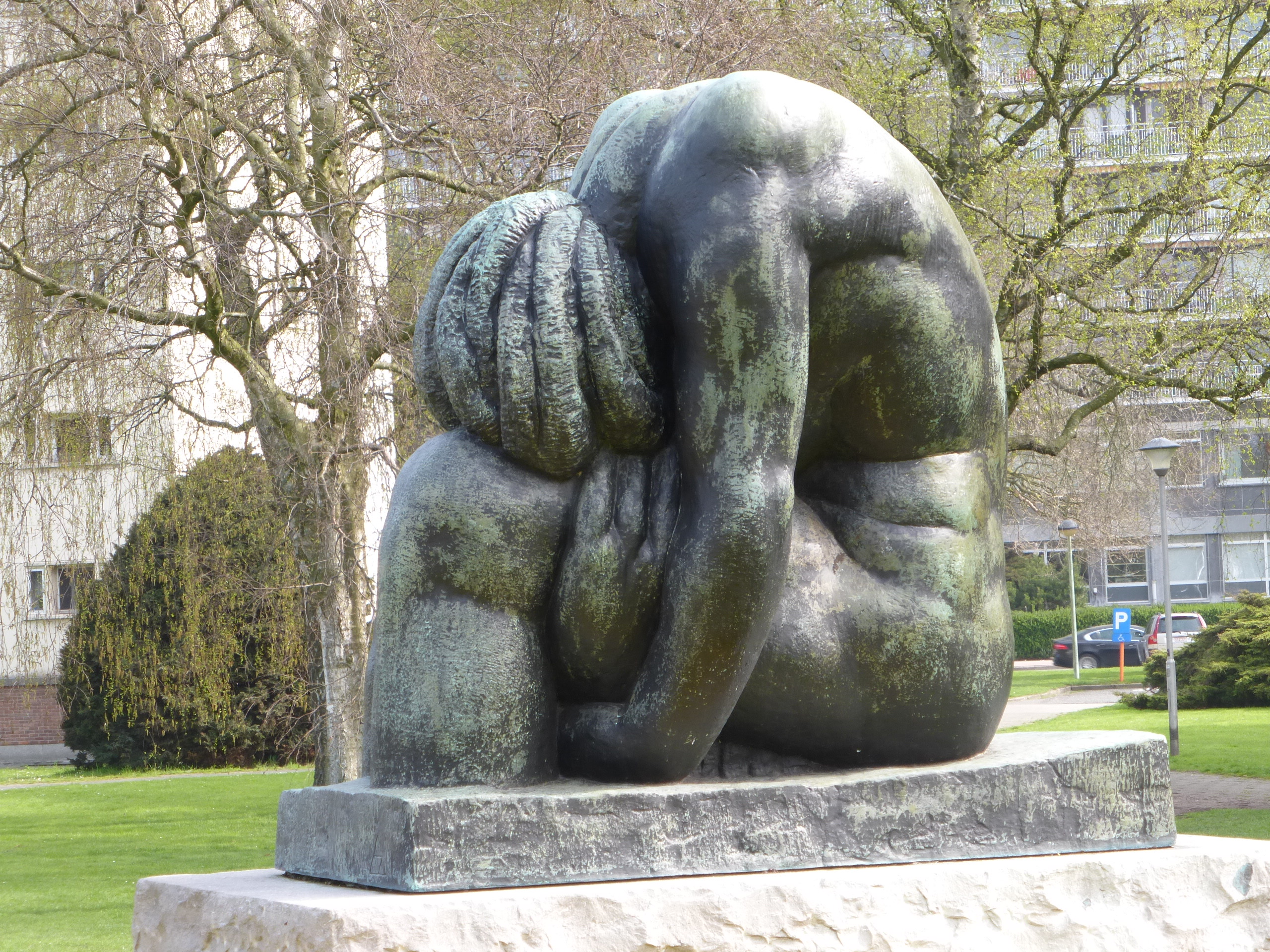
Bronze statue by Aubroeck, Verenigdenatieslaan, Ghent

Karel Aubroeck (28 August 1894 – 28 July 1986) was a Flemish expressionist sculptor and painter. He is best known for his monumental sculptures such as the equestrian statue of King Albert I in Nieuwpoort and the sculpture group of the Van Raemdonck brothers on the Yser Towers in Diksmuide.

== Biography ==
Aubroeck was born in Temse on 28 August 1884. He received his education at the Academy of Temse, and later was trained as a woodcarver in Mechelen. During the First World War he stayed at the front as a soldier. After 1918, he continued his studies at the Academy of Mechelen and settled as an independent woodcarver in his native town of Temse. In 1924 he had the house "De Uil" built for himself in Temse in the Art Deco style. In the 1930s it was expanded with a studio and gallery. He lived there until his death in 1986. The house's garden was redesigned in 2002 by florist Daniël Ost, on behalf of the current owners.

Because he had contributed to the four monumental statues at the foot of the Yser Towers in 1933, Aubroeck was suspected of collaboration with the German occupier in September 1944 and imprisoned for three months.

=== Work ===
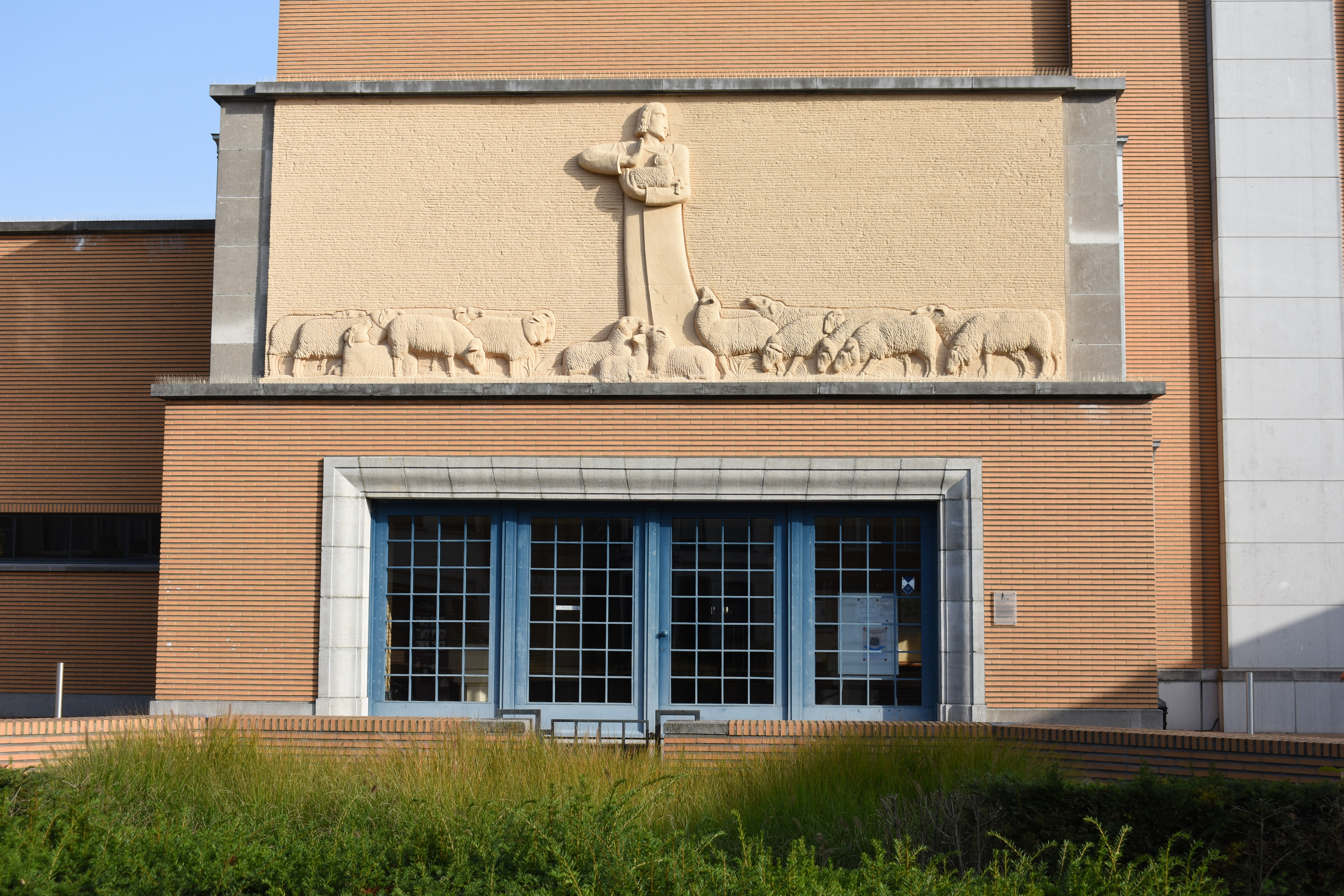
The Good Shepherd, relief, Heilig Hartkerk, Lier

After the First World War, in addition to his wood carvings (in all kinds of exotic woods), he also specialized in monumental constructivist sculpture. He opted for a naturalistic and decorative design in brick technique, natural stone and plaster. Aubroeck mainly worked in an expressionist style, characterized by a closed and stylized character. In 1928 he created his first important monumental work, De wekgroep, which is currently locate in the town hall of Sint-Niklaas. On 15 February 1931, he was selected by the jury of the Yser Pilgrimage Committee from 33 candidates to create four monumental open-air sculptures, with the intention of placing them at the foot of the Yser Tower in Diksmuide, as a symbol of the 'Flemish suffering of the Yser'. With his (third) sculpture of the Van Raemdonck brothers, solemnly inaugurated on 20 August 1933, he acquired national fame as a visual artist.

At the 1935 Universal exposition in Brussels he exhibited the larger-than-life sculpture Vrouw met Lier and at the 1937 World exposition in Paris the mahogany sculpture Bescherming or Angst. Fascinated by the oeuvre of Constant Permeke, Aubroeck also started painting. From 1922 to 1968 he took part in the exhibitions of the Koninklijke Wase Kunstkring and in four biennales in the Middelheim Museum. In addition, he was president of the Royal Flemish Academy of Belgium for Science and the Arts.

His work can be found in the museums of Antwerp and Sint-Niklaas, among others.

== Gallery ==
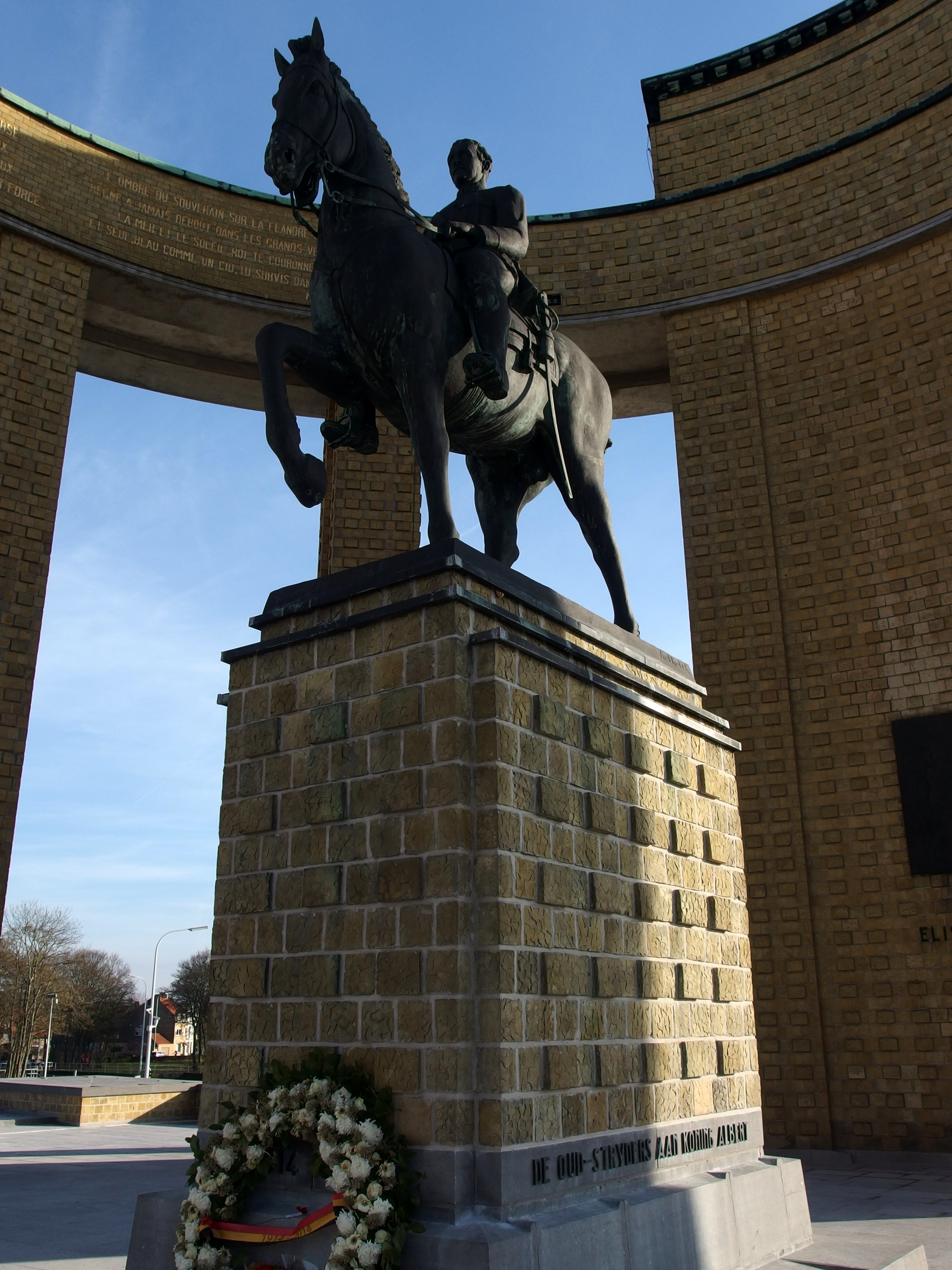
Equestrian Statue of King Albert I in Nieuwpoort

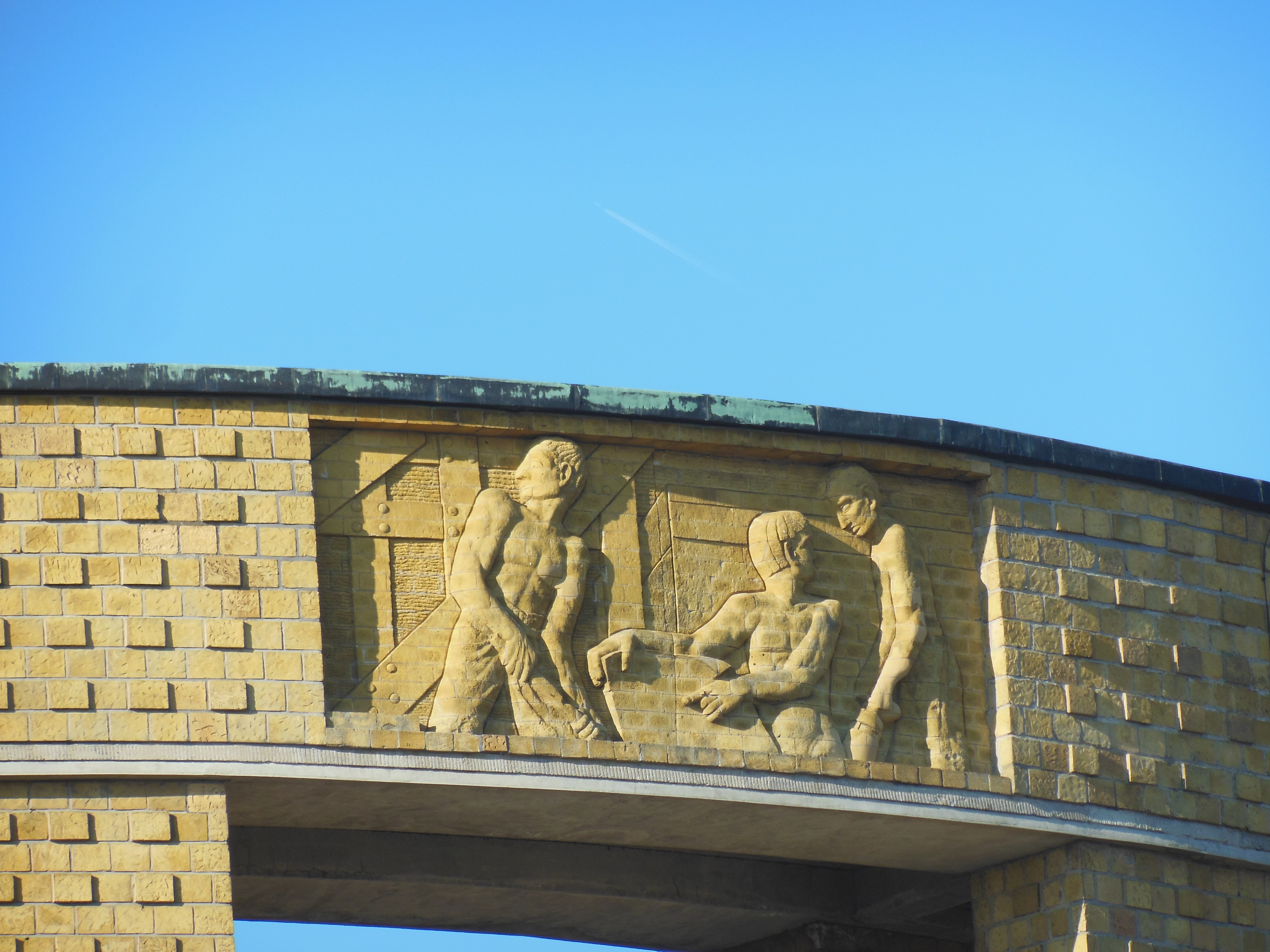
Bas-relief, King Albert I Memorial

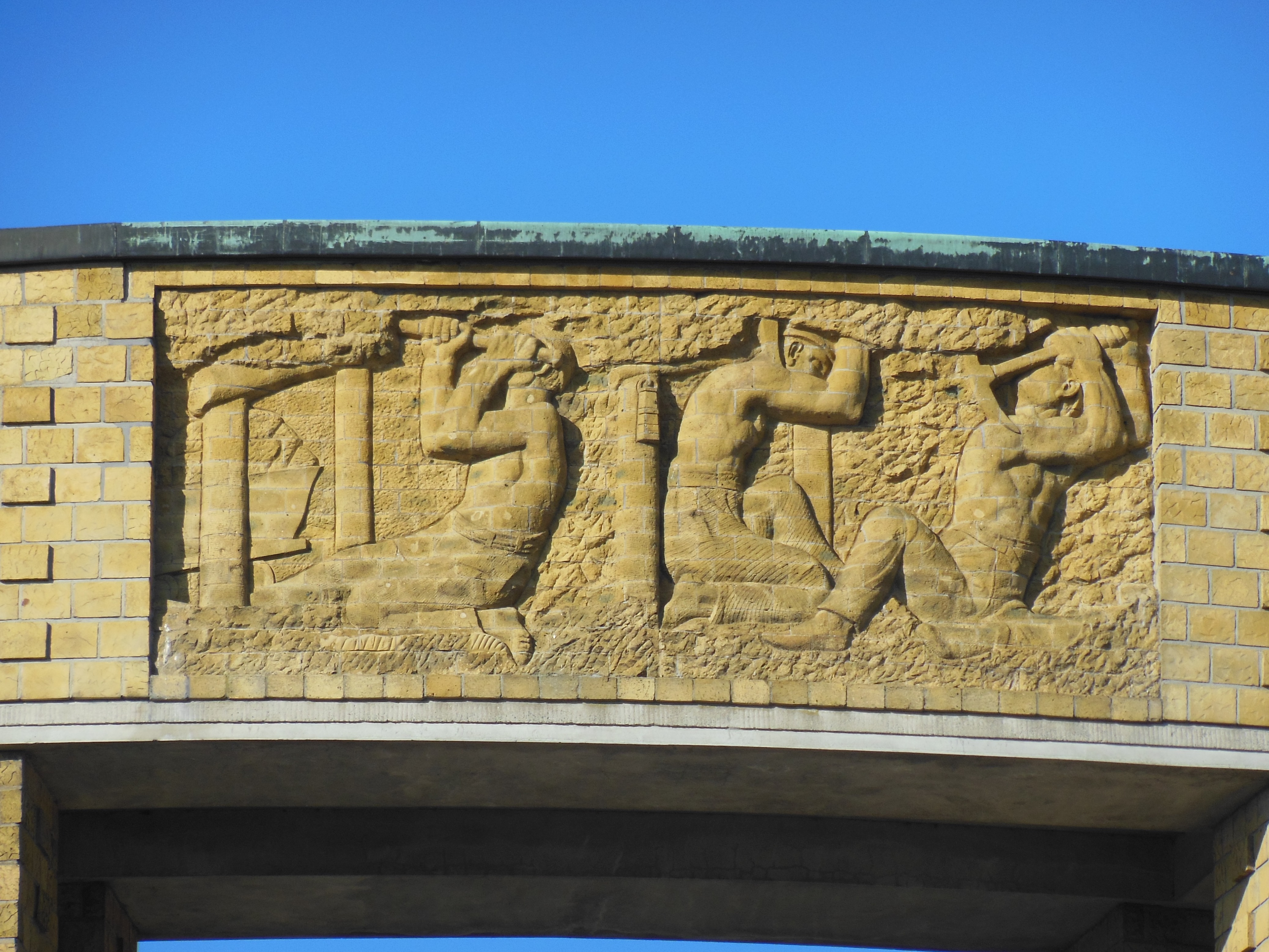
Bas-relief, King Albert I Memorial

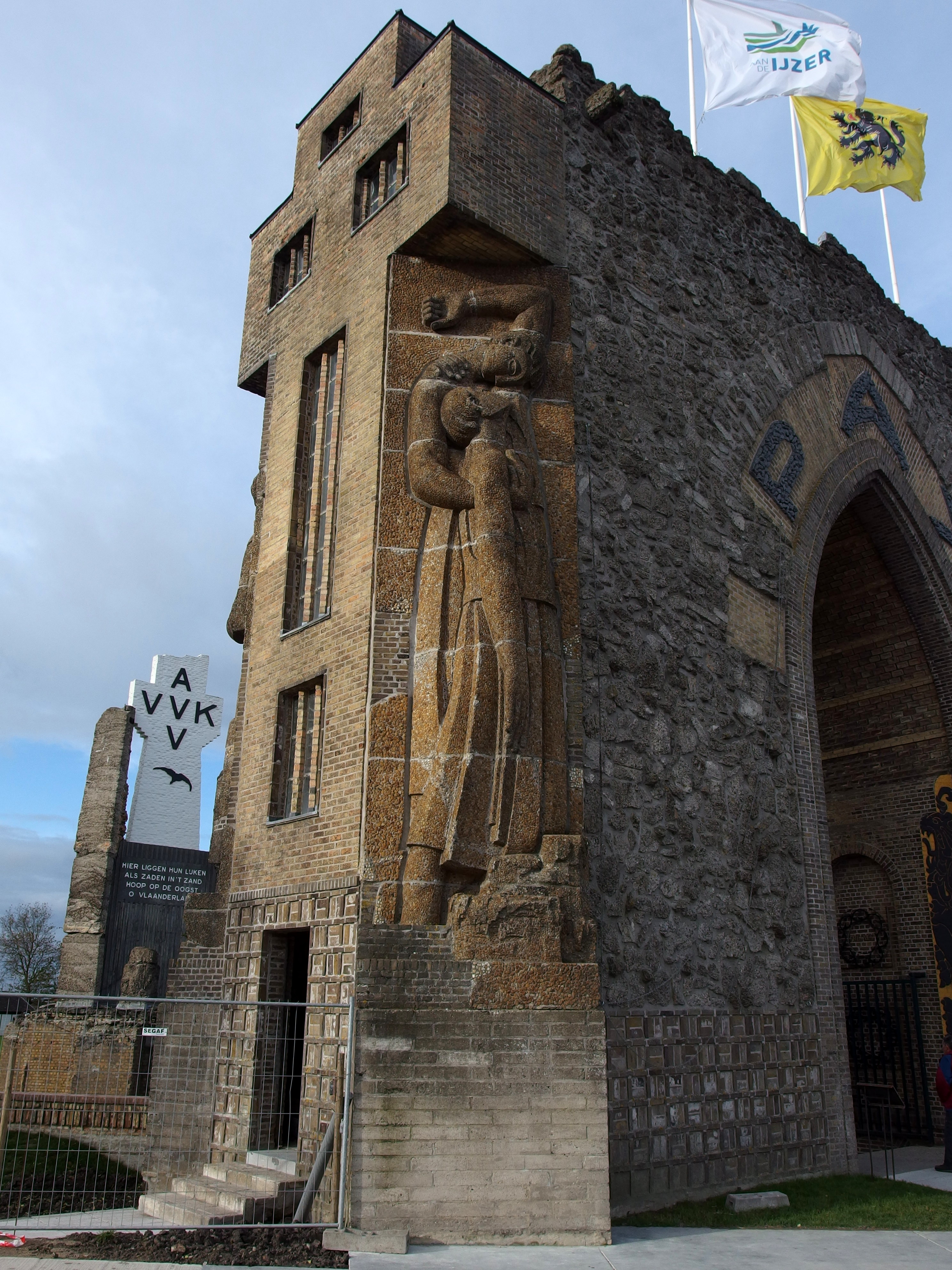
Sculpture on the Paxpoort of the Yser Towers in Diksmuide
