= Hendrik Geeraert =

Belgian World War I hero

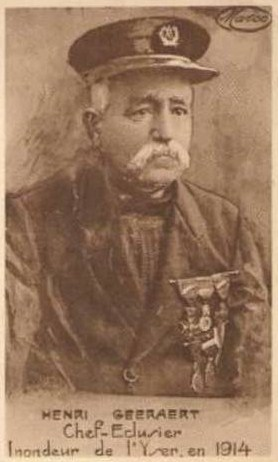
Hendrik Geeraert

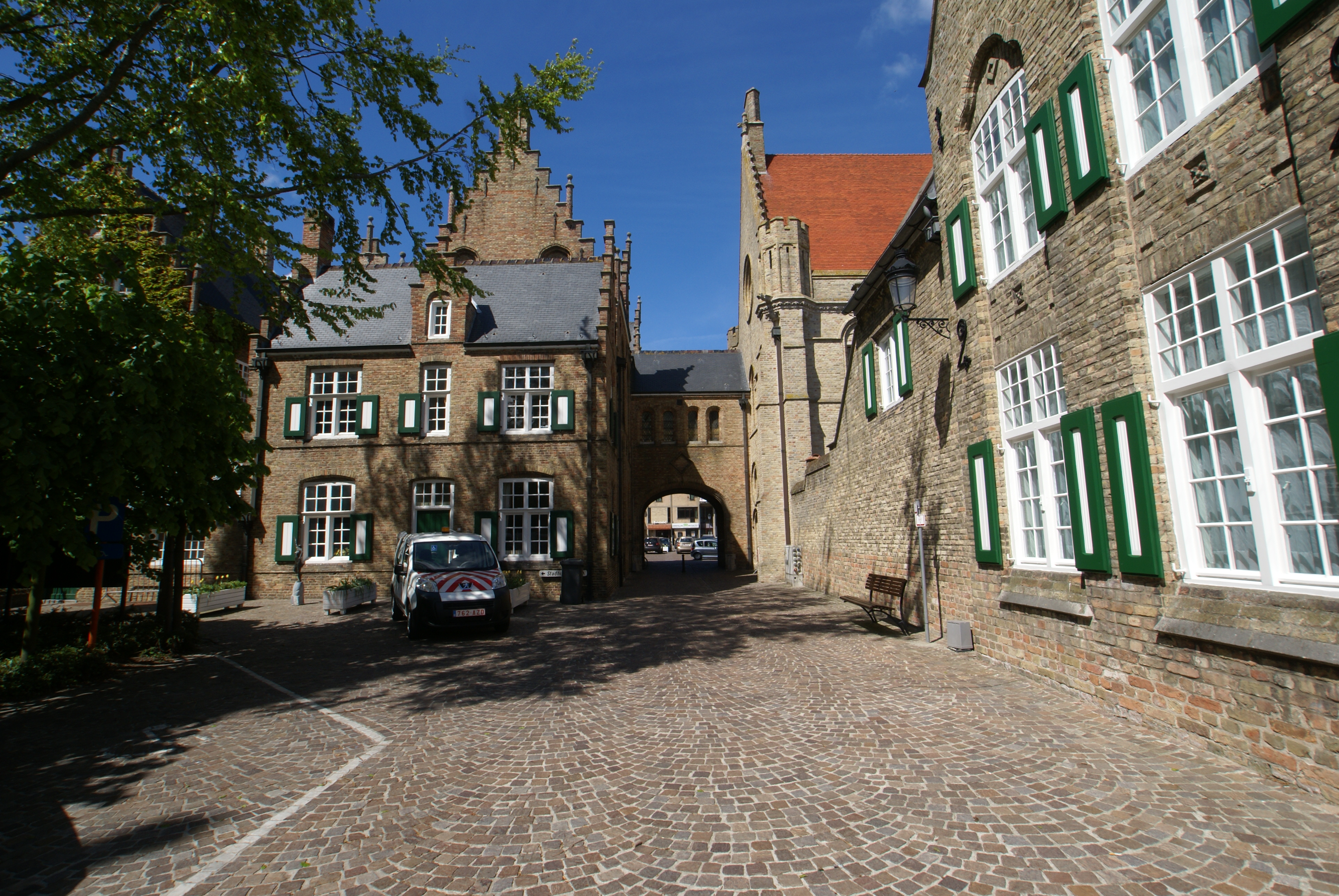
Hendrik Geeraert Square in Nieuwpoort

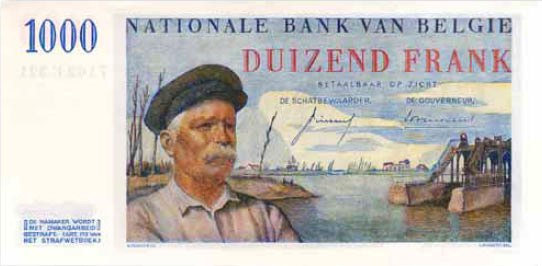
Hendrik Geeraert on the 1000 franc banknote

Hendrik Geeraert (15 July 1863, Nieuwpoort, Belgium – 17 January 1925, Bruges) was a Belgian folk hero who, during the interwar period, came to symbolize the Belgian resistance movement against the German forces in World War I. He became famous among Belgian soldiers in 1914 after the Battle of the Yser where he, serving as a Nieuwpoort skipper, opened the sluices of the Yser River, flooding the polders and bringing the German advance to a halt.

Geeraert was born at Langestraat 40 in Nieuwpoort, the son of the skipper Augustine Gheeraert and Anna Veranneman, a housekeeper and lace-maker. Hendrik became a riverboat skipper. At the age of 24, he married Melanie Jonckheerein in Veurne. The couple had eight children.

== Water Inundation ==
In October 1914, Geeraert came in touch with a Belgian detachment of marine engineers (sapper) guarding the sluices in Nieuwpoort. On 21 October they were ordered by their High Command to flood the polder at Nieuwendamme to protect the endangered bridgehead at Lombardsijde. Geeraert contributed to the success of the operation.

This was, however, a temporary respite and on 25 October they decided to flood the entire region between Nieuwpoort and Diksmuide. Karel Cogge, a Veurne local who worked for the water board, put forward two plans the first of which, plan A, was at first vetoed by the High Command but came back to the forefront after their attempt at the second plan, plan B, did not yield the expected results.

On 29 October, the High Command decided to go ahead and carry out Cogge's Plan A, which involved the opening of the spillway at the Ganzepoot sluice and lock complex in Nieuwpoort. Geeraert assisted in this effort. After the gates were raised, the area was slowly flooded, creating a marshland that spread as far as Diksmuide, avoiding a full German occupation of Belgium.

After this success, the 51-year-old Geeraert remained with the marine company operating at the Ganzepoot. At the end of the war, he became ill. On 25 December 1924, on his deathbed, he was awarded the Order of Leopold. He also received the unofficial honorific of "Legendary figure of the field Army 1914-1918", the same honorific was also used for King Albert I of Belgium. He also received service medals with seven bars for his service at the front. He died in the St. Julius Almshouse of the Brothers of Charity on Bouveriestraat in Bruges on 17 January 1925. (Note: St. Julius ceased to exist in 1931. The medieval charitable institution had existed since 1275 and from 1600 onward devoted itself to the care of "dull people", the insane and foundlings. The Brothers of Charity, together with its almshouses and the neighboring Blind Club, formed the misery corner of Bruges.) He was buried with honors.

His portrait was printed on the 1000 Belgian franc banknote in the 1950s.

== See also ==
- Floodgate
- Gatehouse (waterworks) – An (elaborate) structure to house a sluice gate
- Hydraulic engineering
- Lock
- West Flanders

== Works ==
- Begrafenis van H. Geeraert. In: Westvlaamse Gidsenkring Westhoek, 40 (2004), 3, p. 24-26.
- Bert Bijnens, Wat herinnert in Nieuwpoort nog aan Hendrik Geeraert (1863-1925) - De held van de overstroming. In: Bachten de Kupe, 41 (1999), 4, p. 171-187.
- Godgaf Dalle, Nieuwpoort 14-18. In: De Gidsenkring, 4 (1966), 2, p. 7-9.
- P. Darge, Voor memorie. In: Westvlaamse Gidsenkring Westhoek, 22 (1985), 3, p. 2-13.
- L. De Wolf, Karel Cogge's medewerking aan de onderwateringe in 14. In: Biekorf, 30 (1924), 5 p. 112-113.
- L. De Wolf, Veurne-Ambacht en de onderwateringe in 1914. In: Biekorf, 30 (1924), 2, p. 40-43.
- Karel Lodewijk Cogge. In: Curiosa, 33 (1995), 325, P. 27-28.
- Marcel Messiaen, Hendrik Geeraert, held van de IJzer 50 jaar geleden. In: Bachten de Kupe, 7 (1985), 7, p. 127-138.
- M. Nevejans, De waarheid over K. Cogge. In: Bachten de Kupe, 19 (1977), 6, p. 89-93.
- Luc Vanacker, De IJzer oktober 1914. Een slag te veel? Het idee en de timing van de eerste onderwaterzetting. In: Westvlaamse Gidsenkring Westhoek, 39 (2003), 3, p. 1-21 & in: Shrapnel, 16 (2004), 1, p. 26-48.
- Patrick Vanleene & Jacques Bauwens, Over Karel Cogge. In: Westvlaamse Gidsenkring Westhoek, 40 (2004), 3, p. 1-23.
- Paul Van Pul, Oktober 1914. De initiële inundaties aan het Belgische front. In: Belgisch Tijdschrift voor Militaire Geschiedenis, 30 (1994), 7, p. 541-561.
- H.J. Vanthuyne, De rol van het Vleterse bij de onderwaterzetting in 1914-1918. In: Vlietmara, 4, (1982), 1, p. 13-17.
- M. Van Wesemael, Nog enig nieuws over de IJzer-inundatie van 1914. In: Bachten de Kupe, 25 (1983), 3, p. 69-73.
- Roger Verbeke, De overstroming van de IJzerstreek gedurende Wereldoorlog I. In: De Gidsenkring, 19 (1981), 1, p. 13-16.
