= Van Raemdonck =

Van Raemdonck or Raemdonck is a surname. Notable people with the surname include:

- George Van Raemdonck, Belgian comics artist and painter
- Piet Raemdonck, Belgian visual artist
- Van Raemdonck brothers, Two siblings who were killed while serving in the Belgian Army in WW1
