= IJzerwake =

Political history of Belgium

IJzerwake 2017

The IJzerwake (Dutch, "Yser Wake") is an organisation that split off from the IJzerbedevaart, and unites the more radical Flemish nationalists. Each year in August, they organise a commemoration of the victims of the two World Wars, combined with a rally for Flemish independence and a more conservative government policy. Many participants are members of the political party Vlaams Belang, and some are members and sympathizers of the less radical Nieuw-Vlaamse Alliantie. Ultra-right organisations, such as Voorpost and NSV, also attend.

The annual event derives its name from the IJzer river, around which some of the fiercest and most deadly battles of the first World War were fought. It takes place in a field near Zuidschote, between the towns Diksmuide on the IJzer river, and Ypres. A monument in the field commemorates the Brothers Van Raemdonck, the Flemish soldiers who both fell there on March 26, 1917, killed by enemy fire and apparently having died in each other's arms.

The philosophical concept behind the IJzerwake is that of "Godsvrede" (Truce of God), a medieval term referring to the unification of previously competing factions behind one common cause. This of course symbolises the meeting of the myriad of organisations in the strongly diversified Flemish Movement which the IJzerwake hopes to unite.

== History ==
=== 7th Wake(August 24, 2008) ===
5100 people attended the 2008 IJzerwake. The motto of the meeting was "Now dare with Flanders.". The IJzerwake started with a mass, followed by several speeches, singing together and vendelzwaaien. No politicians from other parties attended.

==== Press coverage ====
- In Steenstrate, in West Flanders, some 4,000 radical Flemings attended the seventh IJzerwake, Flemish national broadcasting network, 24/08/08
- Report by De Standaard newspaper
- Report by De Morgen newspaper
- Report by Gazet van Antwerpen newspaper
