= Joe English (painter) =

Flemish artist

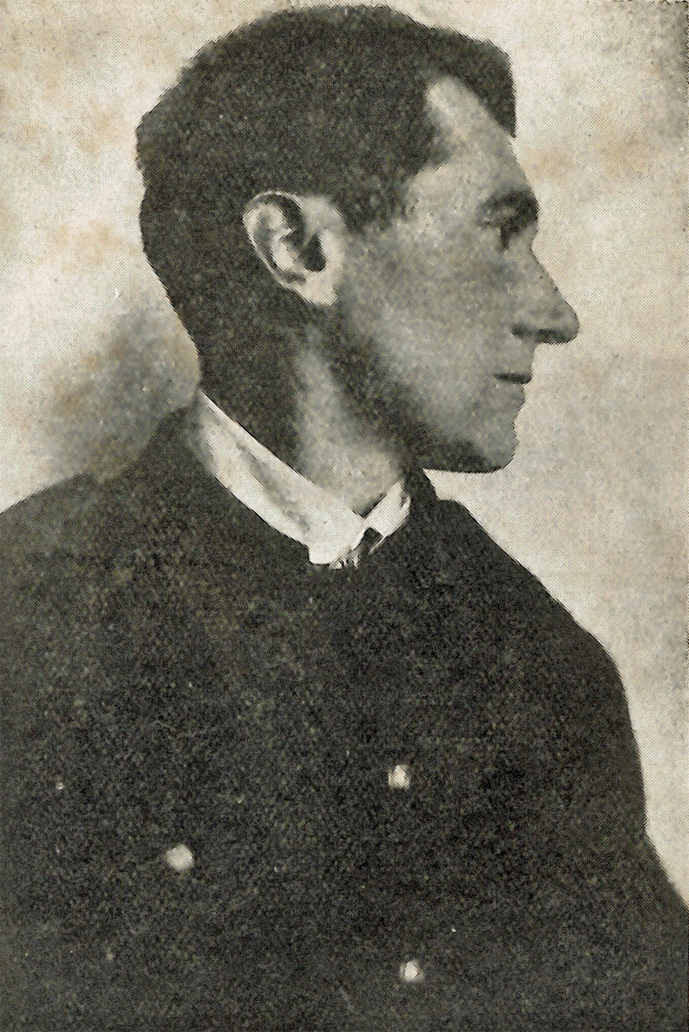
Joe English

Joseph Alphonse Marie English (Bruges, 5 August 1882 – Vinkem, 31 August 1918) was a Flemish draughtsman and painter.

== Life and work ==
His father was an Irishman, Henry English, who married a Flemish woman, Marie Dinnewet. Later on, Joe was naturalised as a Belgian subject, did initial military service with the Belgian Army in 1902, and collaborated closely with the Antwerp artist Juliaan Devriendt. Antwerp was at that time the centre of the Flemish Movement. In 1914, he was mobilised. At the end of 1915, he worked as an artist in Veurne, where he became a prominent front soldier. He designed the typical gravestones honouring the Flemish soldiers who died in the First World War. English died at the age of 36 from an untreated appendicitis in the military hospital L'Océan at Vinkem on the night of 31 August 1918. He was initially buried in the Belgian military cemetery at Steenkerke. The very first IJzerbedevaart took place there at his sepulchre in 1920. In 1930, his corpse was placed in the crypt of the IJzertoren (the Yser Tower, named after the River Yser) in Diksmuide. Through his friend Samuel De Vriendt, a number of English's oil paintings and water colours, which depict Veurne during the war, were permanently exhibited in the town hall there.
