= Yser Towers =

Monument in Diksmuide, Belgium

Coordinates: 51°01′54″N 2°51′12″E

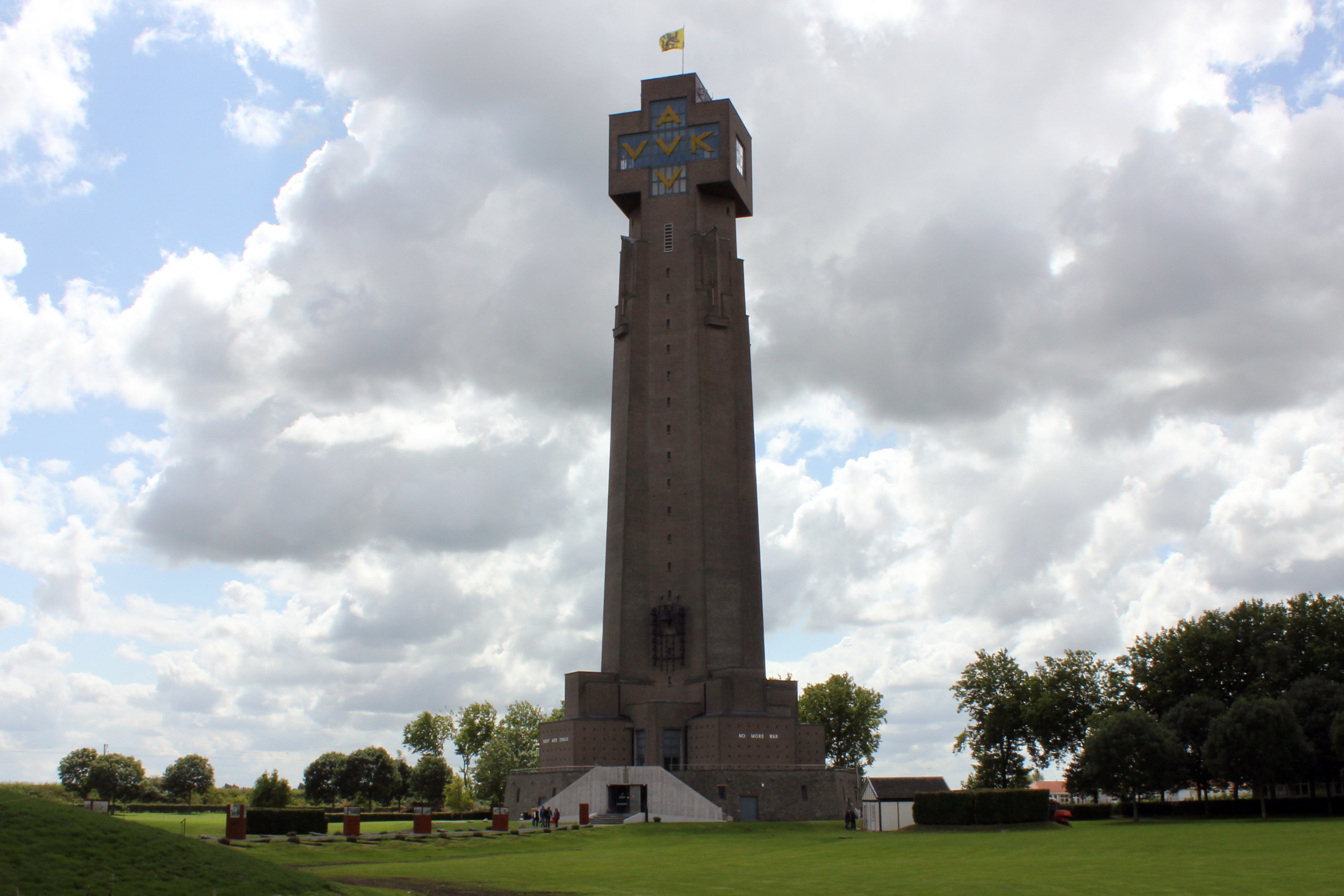
The rebuilt Yser Tower, pictured in 2011, featuring the "AVV—VVK" motto

The Yser Towers (Dutch: Ĳzertoren) are a monument complex near the Yser river at Diksmuide, West Flanders in Belgium. The first tower was built in 1928–30 to commemorate the Belgian soldiers killed on the surrounding Yser Front during World War I and as a monument to Christian pacifism. It subsequently became an important political symbol for the Flemish Movement and was destroyed in 1946 as a result of its association with Flemish nationalist collaboration in German-occupied Belgium in World War II. The current tower was rebuilt alongside the remains of the original and copied its design. It was finished in 1965. It remains a site of political significance to Flemish nationalists and is the center for their annual Yser Pilgrimage (IJzerbedevaart).

== Tower ==
=== First tower, 1930–1946 ===
The idea for a distinct monument in Flanders to commemorate the Flemish soldiers killed in the Belgian Army in World War I had been discussed since at least 1916 under the patronage of the priest Cyriel Verschaeve. After some initial efforts, construction on a 50 metres (160 ft)-high tower-shaped monument near the Yser river at Kaaskerke near Diksmuide began in 1928. The site was symbolic because the Yser had represented the front-line of the Belgian Army for most of the war.

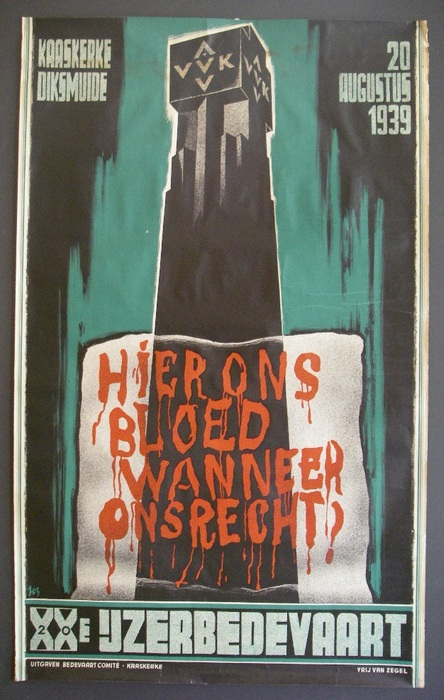
Poster for the 1939 Yser Pilgrimage. The caption reads "Here our blood, when our rights?"

The tower was finished in 1930 and incorporated the Frontbeweging's cruciform motto "All for Flanders—Flanders for Christ" (Alles Voor Vlaanderen, Vlaanderen Voor Kristus, abbreviated to AVV—VVK) and was unveiled at the 11th annual Yser Pilgrimage (IJzerbedevaart). In following years, the human remains of a number of "Yser Symbols" (IJzersymbolen) were reburied in the crypt of the tower, including the Van Raemdonck brothers and Joe English. Initially associated with Christian pacifism, the site soon became one of the most important symbolic political locations for the Flemish Movement and became associated with its largest contemporary political movements, notably the authoritarian Flemish National League (Vlaamsch Nationaal Verbond, VNV) and Union of Dutch National Solidarists (Verbond van Dietsche Nationaal-Solidaristen, Verdinaso).

The association of the Flemish Movement, especially the VNV, with collaborationism during German occupation of Belgium during World War II led two former members of the Belgian Resistance to illegally destroy the tower with dynamite on the night of 15–16 March 1946 as a reprisal. The ruins of the first tower were retained and were subsequently modeled into the Peace Gate (Paxpoort) in 1950.

=== Second tower, 1965–present ===
The second tower still stands at the site near to the remnants of the first. It was built to roughly the same design as the first but is larger at 84 metres (276 ft) tall. The four sides of the base of the tower read "Never war again" in the three languages of Belgium, as well as in English. Work began in July 1952. The crypt was finished on 11 November 1958 and the tower itself was officially inaugurated on 22 August 1965.

The tower houses the Yser Museum (Museum aan de IJzer) which belongs to the United Nations network of peace museums. The museum houses the large painting, The Golden Canvass of Flanders (Het Gulden Doek van Vlaanderen) by Dutch-born Belgian painter Henry Luyten. The painting depicts a fictional meeting of the one hundred people who in Luyten's opinion played the most important roles in Flemish history. It is situated close to the preserved section of wartime trenches known as the "Trench of Death" (Dodengang).

== See also ==
- Anton van Wilderode
- King Albert I Memorial (1938)
- List of World War I memorials and cemeteries in Flanders
- Monument to the Battle of the Nations (1913)
