= King Albert I Memorial =

War memorial in Nieuwpoort, Belgium

- Koning Albert I-monument
- Belgium
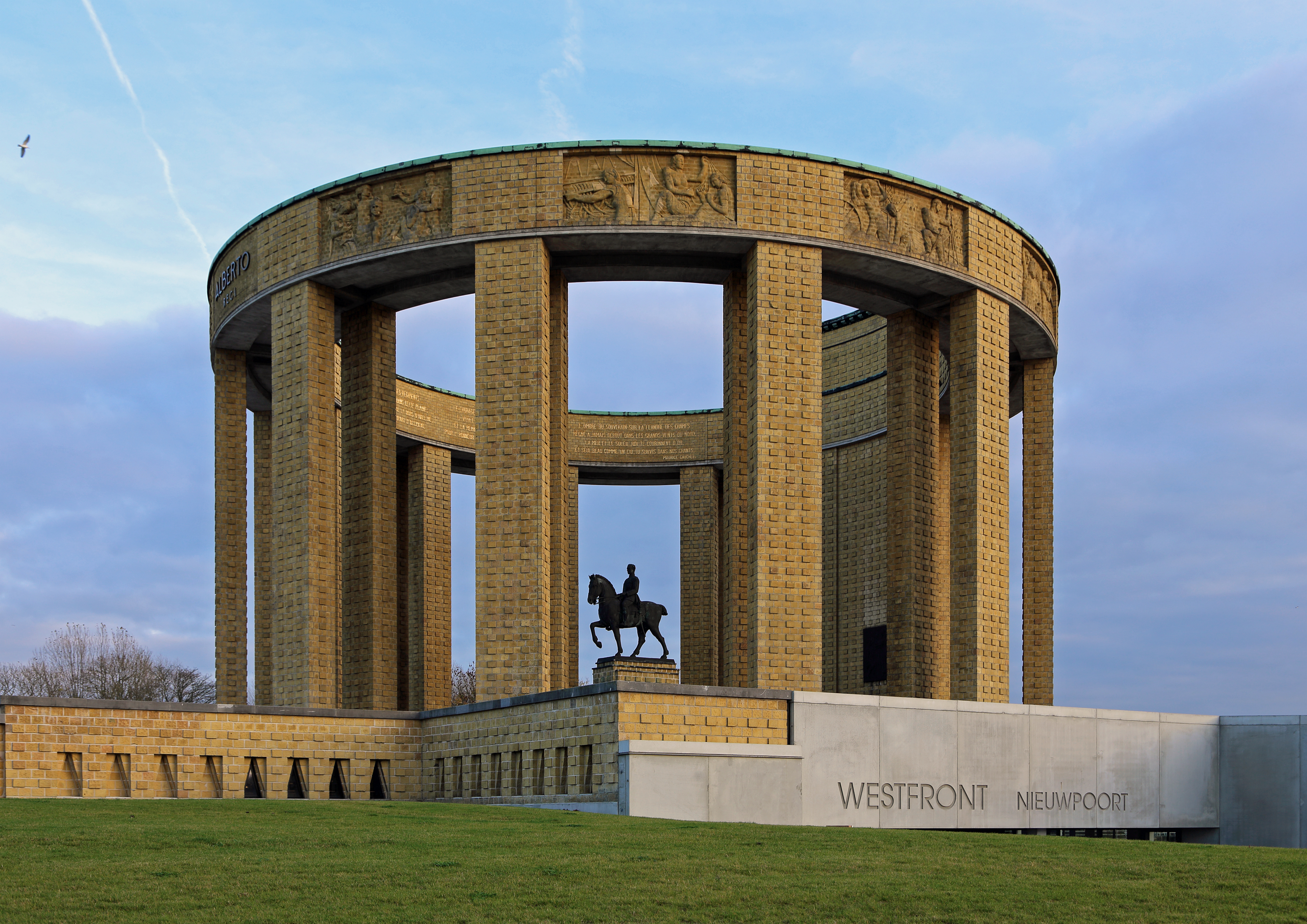
- Memorial with equestrian statue of Albert I of Belgium
- For King Albert I of Belgium and the Belgian troops during the First World War
- Unveiled: 1938
- Location: 51°08′10″N 2°45′20″E; Nieuwpoort, Belgium
- Designed by: Julien de Ridder

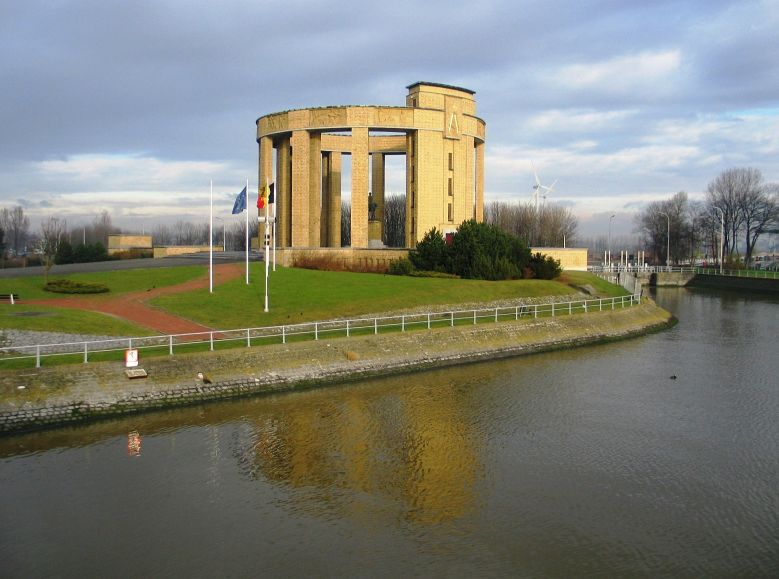
King Albert I Memorial, 2004

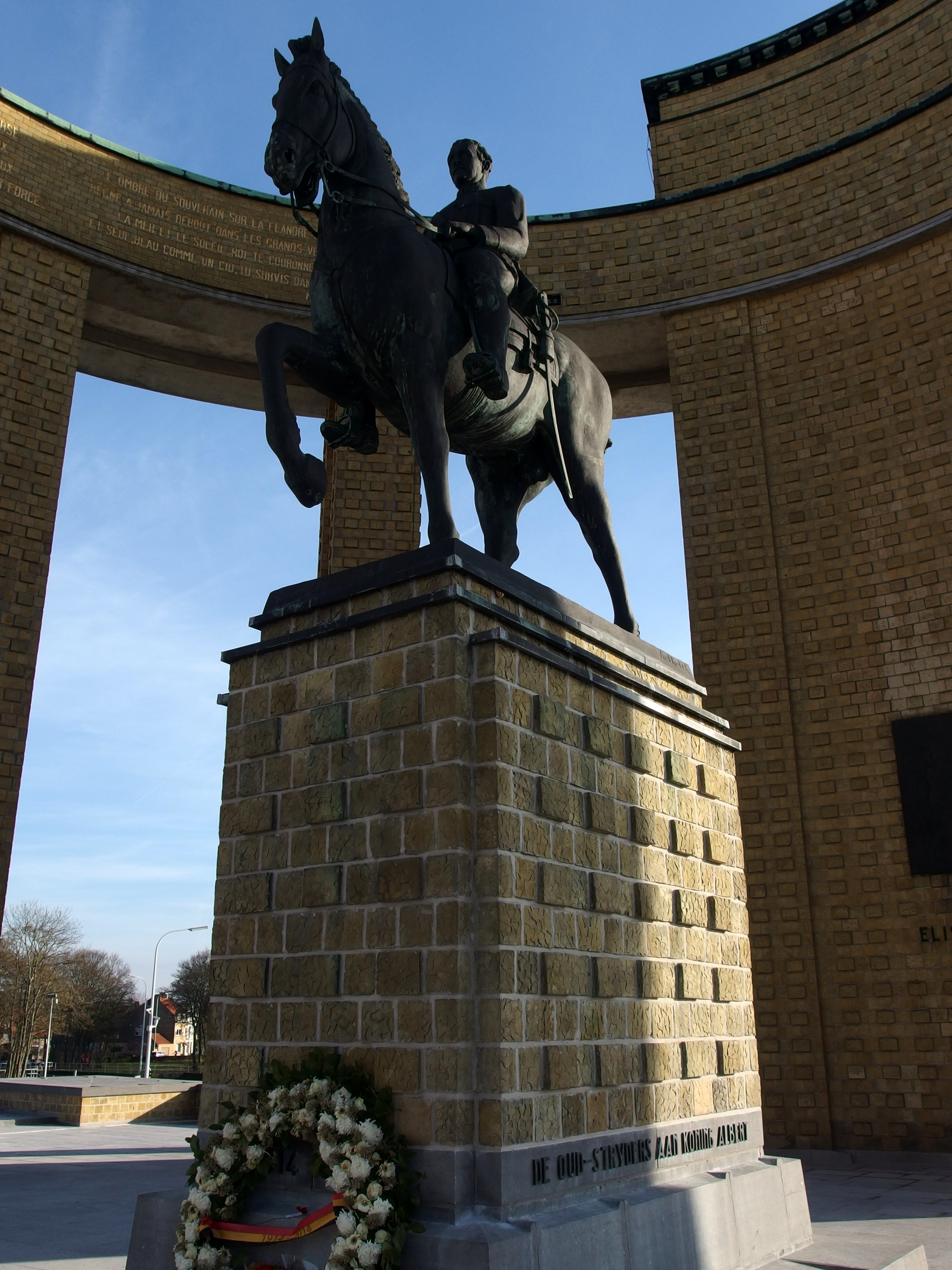
Equestrian statue of King Albert I

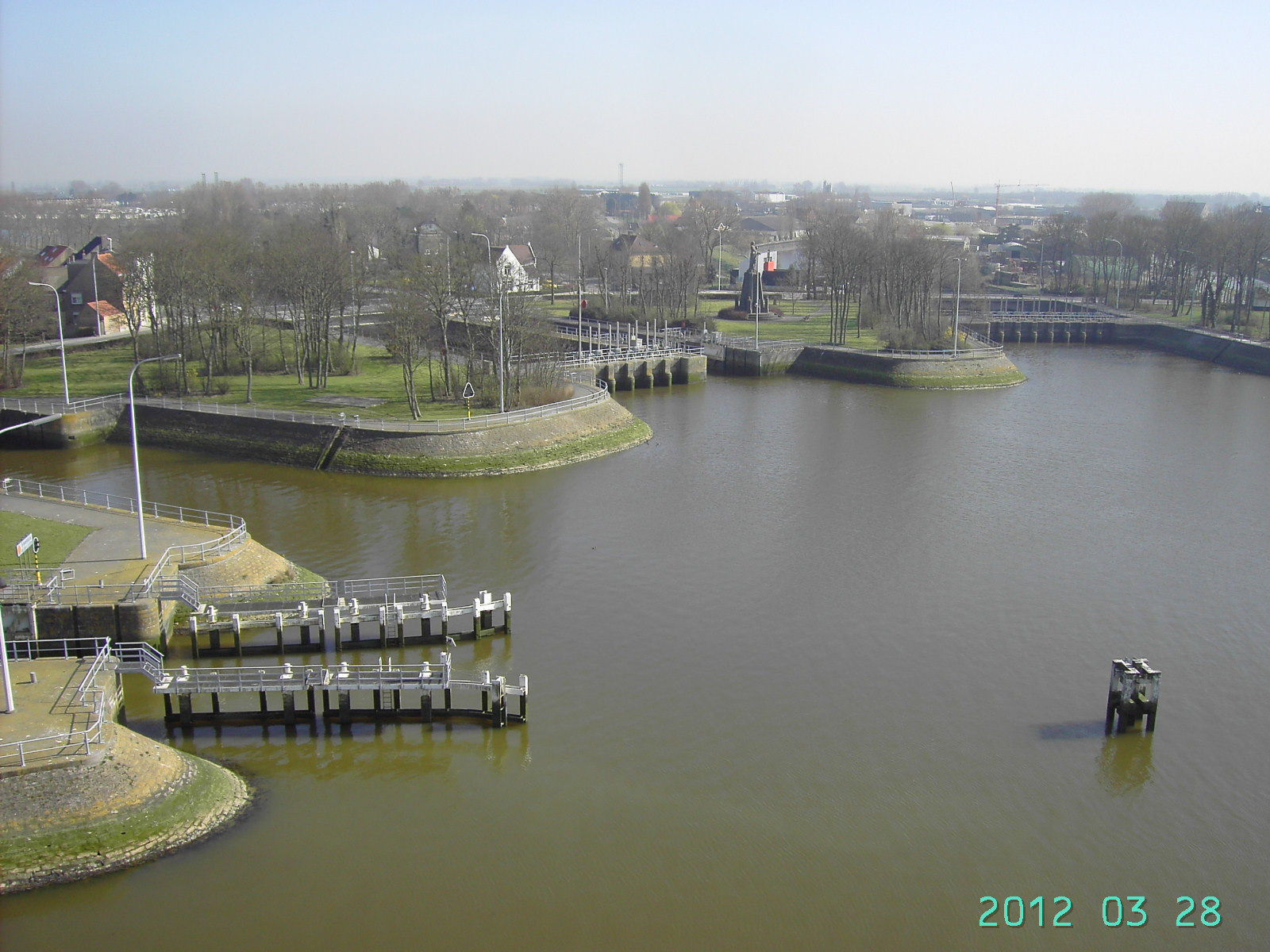
View of the Ganzepoot sluices complex from the monument

The King Albert I Memorial, also named the King Albert I Monument (Dutch: Koning Albert I-monument; French: Monument au Roi Albert I^{er}), is a memorial at the Belgian coastal city of Nieuwpoort. It is located right outside the old town, on the right bank of the Yser river at the lock complex Ganzepoot. The monument was erected in 1938 after a design of Julien de Ridder and honours both King Albert I of Belgium and the Belgian troops at the time of the First World War.

== Description ==
The circular monument is 25 metres (82 ft) tall and is 30 metres (98 ft) in diameter. It has ten columns, built out of bricks from the Yser plain. A prominent circular beam caps the structure. On this beam, there is a walkway with orientation tables. On the central square of the monument, there is an equestrian statue of King Albert I, designed by Karel Aubroeck.

=== Inauguration ===
The building was inaugurated on 24 July 1938 in the presence of King Albert of Belgium's son King Leopold III, Elisabeth of Bavaria, Queen of Belgium, Prince Charles, Prince Baudouin, and Princess Josephine-Charlotte of Belgium. The whole complex is protected since 1999 as a monument.

=== Nieuport Memorial ===
A monument for the British troops, the Nieuport Memorial, was erected on the square in front of the Albert Memorial. It consists of a commemorative column and commemorates the names of 566 British officers and soldiers who died during the battles at the Belgian coast during the First World War, particularly in 1917.

== Westfront Nieuwpoort ==
The memorial was restored and expanded, before the reopening and renaming on 18 October 2014. The renewed Westfront Nieuwpoort was visited by heads of state and government on 28 October, including Belgian King Philippe and German chancellor Angela Merkel. The visitors' centre was designed by the Antwerp architects' workshop (Antwerps Architecten Atelier). A permanent exhibition illustrates the inundation of the Yser plain in 1914 by opening the sluices at the Ganzepoot. The monumental panoramic painting "Panorama of the Battle of the Yser in October 1914" by Alfred Bastien is shown in a downsized, digitised format. The original dimensions are 115 metres (377 ft) by 14 metres (46 ft).
