= Ganzepoot =

The Ganzepoot: 1. Yser; 2. Nieuwpoort-Plassendale Canal; 3. Canal de Furnes; 4. Nieuwdamme channel; 5. Slijkvaart channel; 6. Grote Beverdijkvaart channel; 7. Old Veurnevaart channel; 8. North Sea

The Ganzepoot (Dutch for goose foot) is a series of locks and spillways in the inner port of Nieuwpoort, Belgium which connect one river, three water channels and two canals with the mouth of the Yser River and the maritime port. The spillways control the level of the two channels and the drainage of the polders.

The Ganzepoot was built in the second half of 19th century but was almost completely destroyed in World War I. The name comes from the fact that infrastructure collectively resembles a six-toed goose foot.

From left to right (north to south) are:

- The Nieuwbedelf spillway (also known as the Grote Westwatering spillway) - a polder overflow drainage ditch between the Nieuwpoort-Plassendale Canal and the coast
- The Gravensas lock that connects the Nieuwpoort-Plassendale Canal, the Yser and the Canal de Furnes.
- The Springsas: - Originally this was the drainage sluice of the old Nieuwdamme Creek, the former bed of the Yser before its recanalization. The creek became unnavigable in the 17th century due to the absence of a lock. The pre-1914 reconstruction preserves some markedly different methods than current views.
- The obsolete lock Iepersas between the recanalized Yser and its mouth; no longer used for shipping, with a spillway on the left with five openings.

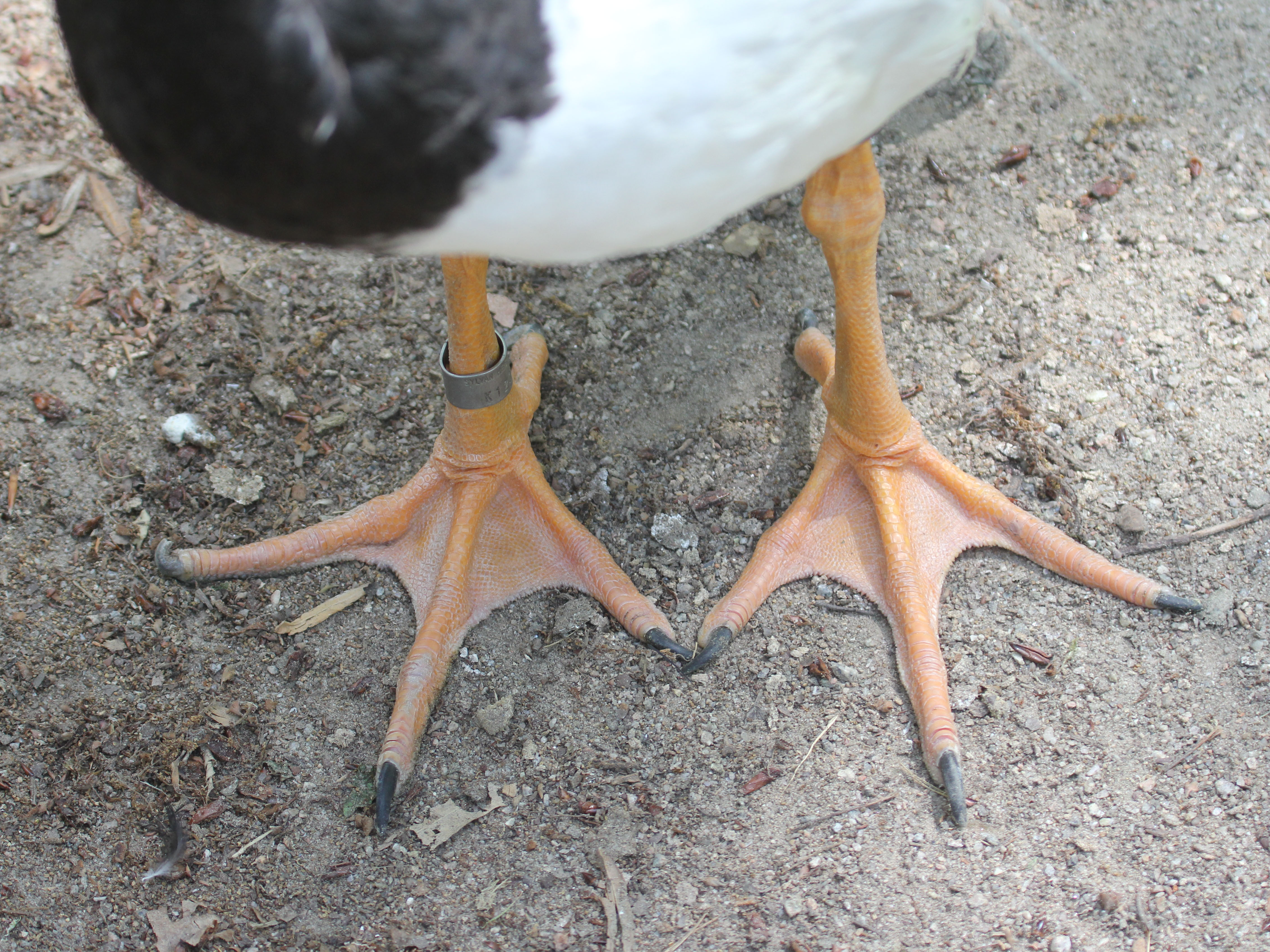
Magpie goose

- The Veurne-Ambacht or Noordvaart drainage sluice. This is the famous spillway where Hendrik Geeraert and Fernand Ume opened the gates on October 29, 1914, flooding the lands between the Yser and the old Nieuwpoort-Diksmuide railroad, and stopping the advance of German troops in World War I. At that time, the sliding gates were opened manually by hand-crank; nowadays the operation is motorized.
- The Veurnesas a drainage sluice at the beginning of the Nieuwpoort-Dunkirk Canal. It has a spillway on the right with eight openings. Provides access to the Veurnevaart (or, Canal de Furnes, the portion of the canal running in French territory after crossing the border at Veurne (fr. Furnes) ).

== See also ==
- Nieuport Memorial
- King Albert I Memorial
