= Wulpen, Belgium =

Wulpen
- Village
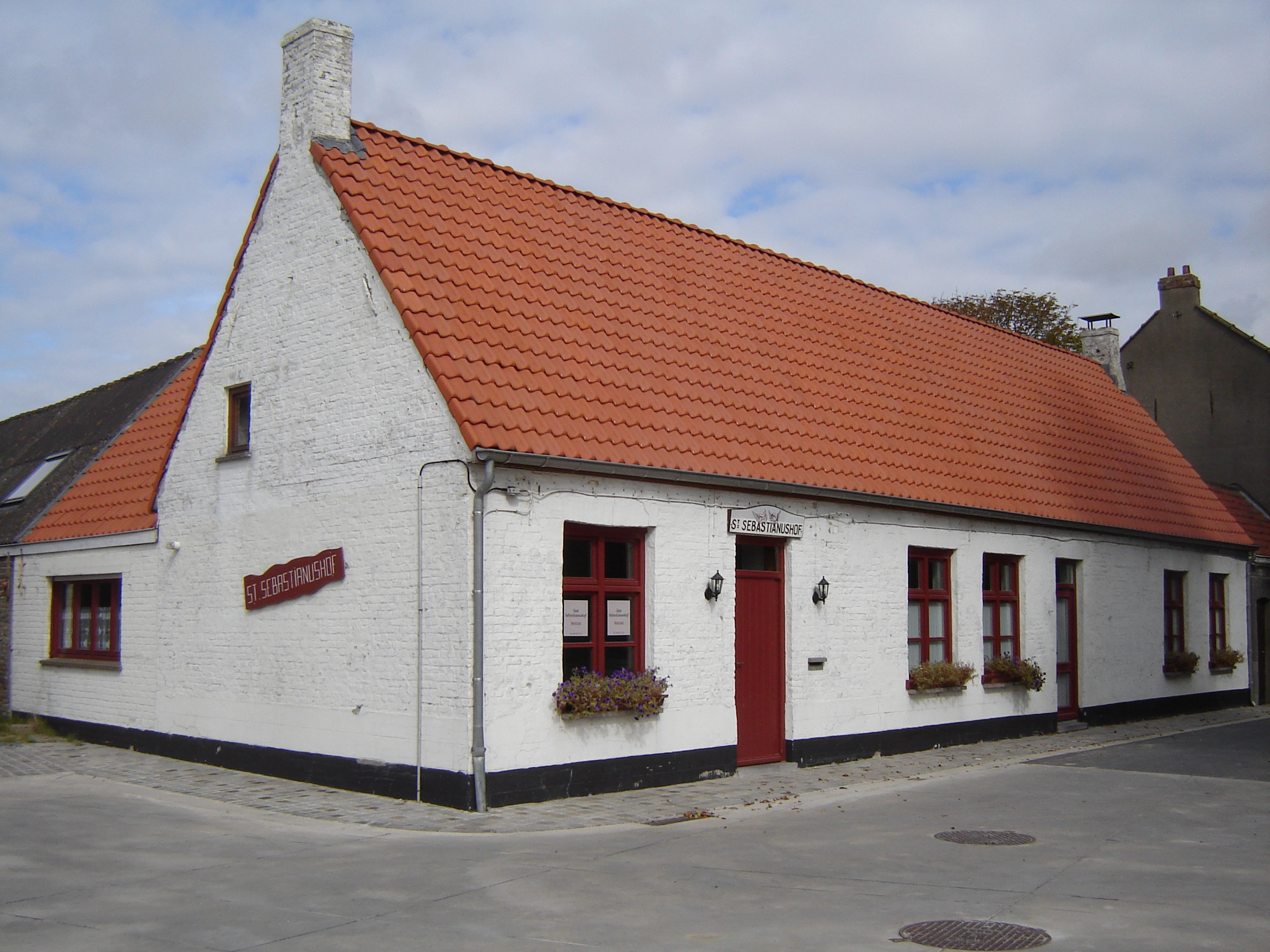
- Sint-Sebastianushof, a former inn, located at the village square

- Location in Belgium
- Coordinates: 51.0996°N 2.6991°E
- Country: Belgium
- Region: Flemish Region
- Province: West Flanders
- Municipality: Koksijde

Area
  - Total: 12.37 km^{2} (4.78 sq mi)

Population (1970)
  - Total: 672
  - Density: 54.3/km^{2} (141/sq mi)
- Time zone: CET

Wulpen (West Flemish: Wulpn) is a village in the municipality of Koksijde in the Belgian province of West Flanders. The village can be reached via the N39. Until 1970, Wulpen was an independent municipality.

== History ==
Wulpen was first mentioned in 961. During the 12th century it was a fishing village. In 1577, the village was destroyed by the Geuzen, rebels fighting for an independent Netherlands. In the 17th century the village was sieged first by France and later by Spain. In 1900, Wulpen was an agricultural community with four brickyards.

During World War I, the German army was racing through Belgium towards to the North Sea. In the Battle of the Yser which took place October 1914, the polders between the Yser and the railway line were inundated. The church spire, and post mill were destroyed during the battle, however the advance of the German army was halted and the Yser Front was created. In June 1917, the children of the village and many of the adults were evacuated to France. In 1919, a war memorial was built for the Belgian 4th Army division stationed around Wulpen.

In 1970, the municipality of Wulpen merged with Oostduinkerke, and in 1976, it was merged into Koksijde.
