= Bourbourg Canal =

Canal in northern France

Canal de Bourbourg
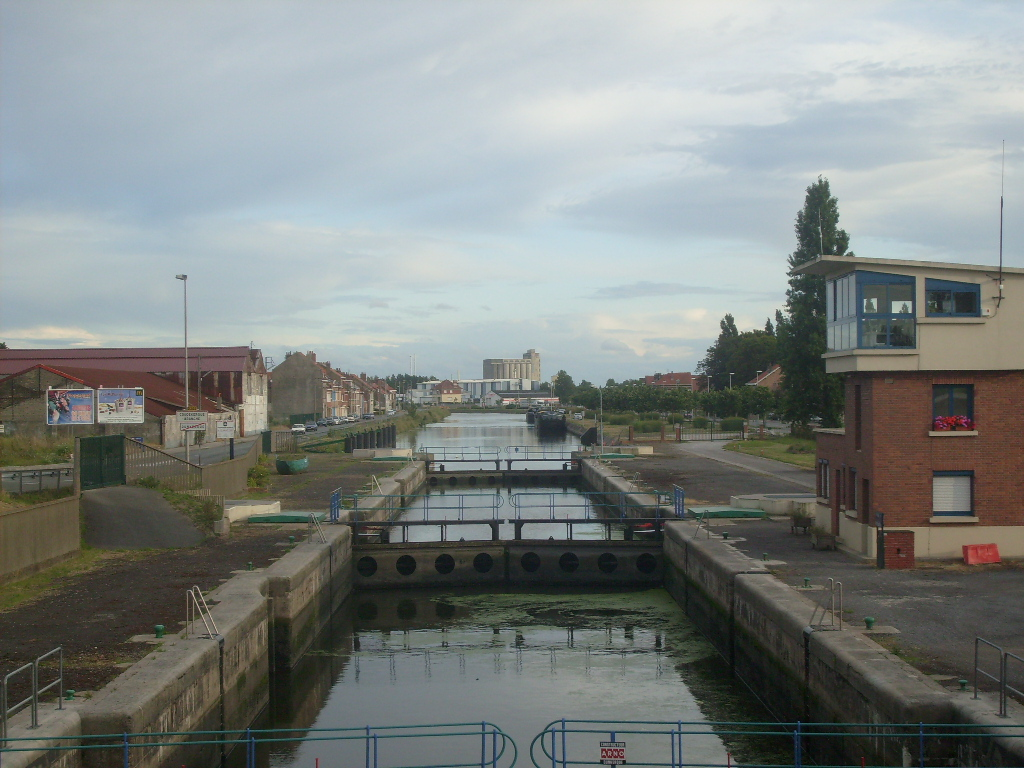
- Jeu de Mail lock on the Canal de Bourbourg in Dunkirk

Specifications
- Length: 21 km
- Locks: 3

Geography
- Start point: Inner Harbour at Port of Dunkirk
- End point: River Aa near Bourbourg
- Beginning coordinates: 51°01′41″N 2°21′58″E
- Ending coordinates: 50°56′15″N 2°09′04″E

The Canal de Bourbourg (French pronunciation: [kanal də buʁbuʁ]) is a 21 km long canal which connects the river Aa (near Bourbourg) to the inner harbours of the port of Dunkerque in the Nord department, in northern France. For a short length in the middle it is part of the high-capacity waterway Liaison Dunkerque-Escaut (Dunkirk-Scheldt Link).

== See also ==
- List of canals in France
