= Piet Raemdonck =

Belgian visual artist

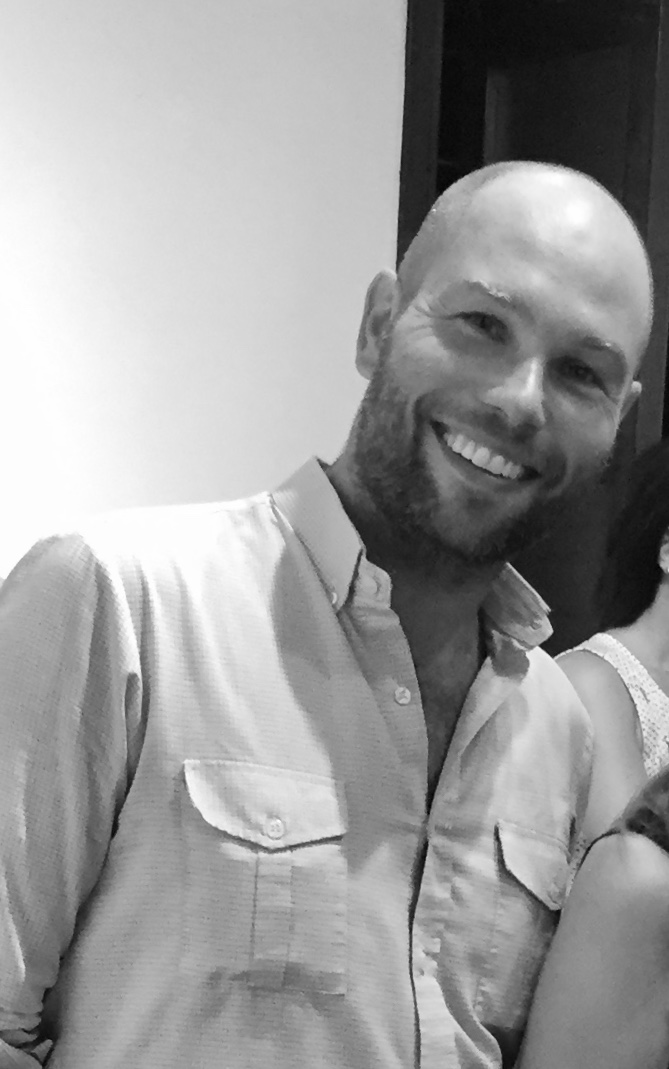
- Born: 1972 (age 53–54)

Piet Raemdonck (born 1972, Ghent) is a Belgian visual artist. His work has focused on the still life, the landscape and the interior. Other than a few early exceptions, the human figure is entirely absent from his oeuvre.

Piet Raemdonck trained in fine art printmaking at Sint-Lukas in Antwerp (today the Karel de Grote-Hogeschool) and studied film directing at Sint-Lukas in Brussels for a year. Although primarily known as a painter, the artist produces work in a wide variety of mediums (oil, acrylic, watercolour, coloured pencil and oil pastel) and on different supports (canvas, panel and paper). He often uses collage techniques.

The first comprehensive monograph dedicated to his oeuvre, Piet Raemdonck, what I’ve seen and what I’ve dreamt, was published by Hannibal in November 2016. This illustrated publication contains essays by writers and art critics Leonard Koren, Abdelkader Benali, Els Fiers and Philip Feyfer. Of Raemdonck's work, the film director Joachim Lafosse has said: “At the corner of an Antwerp district, I discovered the paintings, their vitality, their light, their welcome. I didn’t stop immediately and continued on my way. Driven by forgotten memories and a feeling that I was destined to miss the paintings, I turned around, I looked again, and I understood that this work was ‘a room in oneself’. I understood that, and never again shall I forget it.”

Piet Raemdonck has been exhibiting with galleries in Belgium and the Netherlands since 1994. In 2007, he opened an exhibition space for his own work in the modernist Fierens building in Antwerp, adding a second wing just a few years later. The artist has organised several thematic exhibitions in the gallery, which is now an established destination in the ‘Zuid’ neighbourhood of Antwerp. In late 2017, Raemdonck’s work was shown in a two-venue exhibition in Havana, Cuba.

Piet Raemdonck’s paintings feature in the film Hannah (Andrea Pallaoro, USA/IT/B), starring Charlotte Rampling. He has also collaborated with Axel Vervoordt, Gert Voorjans, Dries Van Noten and Christian Wijnants, amongst others.

== Exhibitions ==
- Kronenburgstraat 41, Antwerp (B): 'New Horizons' (2018)
- Centro de Arte Contemporáneo Wifredo Lam, Havana (CU) & Art Space 331 Havana (CU) En un jardín belga' (2017)
- Kronenburgstraat 41, Antwerp (B): 'Halfway There' (2017)
- Galerie Zwart Huis, Knokke/Antwerp (B): 'Landscapes' (with Koen Deprez, Fik Van Gestel, Jan De Vliegher, Yves Beaumont, Colin Waeghe en Jozef Van Ruyssevelt) (2016)
- Galerie Zwart Huis, Knokke (B): 'Look No Further' (2015)
- Kronenburgstraat 41, Antwerp (B): 'Drugstore' (2015)
- Kronenburgstraat 41, Antwerp (B): 'Atlas' (2014)
- Kronenburgstraat 41, Antwerp (B): 'Interieurexterieur' (2014)
- Kronenburgstraat 41, Antwerp (B): 'Revelaties' (2013)
- Kronenburgstraat 41, Antwerp (B): 'This Other Place' (2013)
- Kronenburgstraat 41, Antwerp (B): 'The Juggler's Garden' (2012)
- Kronenburgstraat 41, Antwerp (B): 'Fresh Flowers, Constructions & Deconstructions (2011)
- Galerie Zwart Huis, Knokke (B) : 'Kamerzichten' (with Jozef Van Ruyssevelt) (2011)
- KKronenburgstraat 41, Antwerp (B): 'Omaggio A Morandi' (2010)
- Kronenburgstraat 41, Antwerp (B): 'Water Music' (2009)
- Kronenburgstraat 41, Antwerp (B): ''Fun City' (with Luc Boudens) (2008)
- HSO, Antwerp (B) ‘Composities’ (2007)
- Kronenburgstraat 41, Antwerp (B): 'More Flower Vases' (2007)
- Galerie Quintessens, Utrecht (NL): 'Composities’ (met Peter Blokhuis) (2006)
- Christophe Coppens, Brussels (B): ‘These are a few of my favorite things’ (2005-2006)
- Indian Caps, Antwerpen (B): ‘Nothing but flower vases’ (2005)
- Galerie Zijsprong, Antwerp (B): ‘Drâa-Valley Southern Morocco’ (2005)
- 'Boer en Croon, Amsterdam (NL): Bloemlezing' (2004)
- Galerie Zijsprong, Antwerp (B): ‘Ringenhof’ (2004)
