= Nieuwpoort, Belgium =

City and municipality in Belgium

Nieuwpoort: Nieuwpôort (West Flemish); Nieuport (French)
- City and municipality
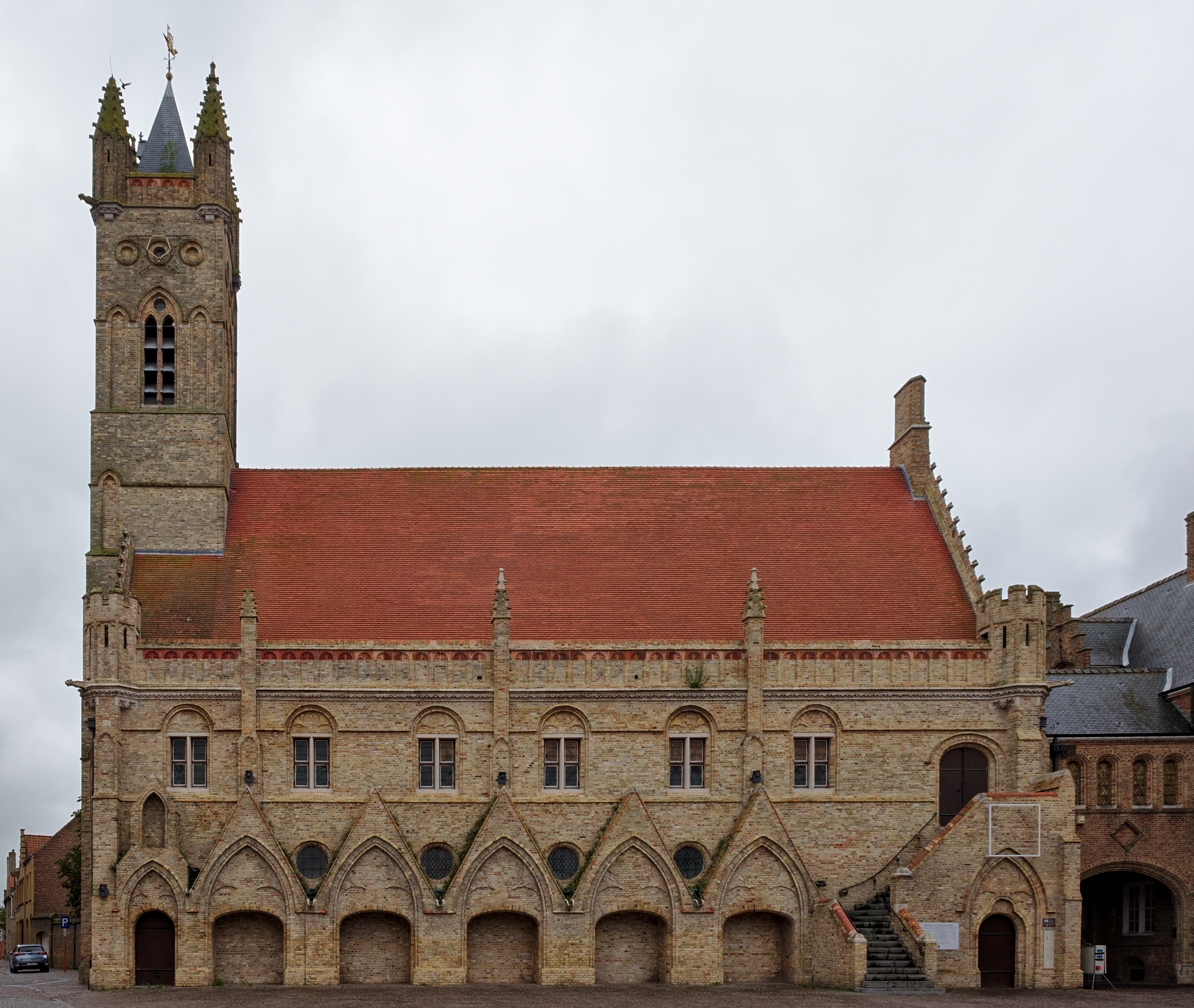
- Belfry and city hall

- Flag Coat of arms

- Location of Nieuwpoort in West Flanders
- Interactive map of Nieuwpoort
- Location in Belgium
- Coordinates: 51°07′N 02°45′E
- Country: Belgium
- Community: Flemish Community
- Region: Flemish Region
- Province: West Flanders
- Arrondissement: Veurne

Government
  - Mayor: Geert Vanden Broucke (CD&V)
  - Governing party: CD&V

Area
  - Total: 33.28 km^{2} (12.85 sq mi)

Population (2022-01-01)
  - Total: 11,488
  - Density: 345.2/km^{2} (894.0/sq mi)
- Postal codes: 8620
- NIS code: 38016
- Area codes: 058
- Website: www.nieuwpoort.be

Nieuwpoort (/ˈnjuːpɔːrt/ NEW-port, Dutch: [ˈniupoːrt]; West Flemish: Nieuwpôort; French: Nieuport [njøpɔʁ]) is a city and municipality located in Flanders, one of the three regions of Belgium, in the province of West Flanders.

== Geography ==
The municipality comprises the town of Nieuwpoort proper, as well as Ramskapelle and Sint-Joris.

On 1 January 2008, Nieuwpoort had a total population of 11,062. Its land area is 31.00 km^{2} (11.97 sq mi), which gives a population density of 350 inhabitants per km².

In Nieuwpoort, the Yser flows into the North Sea.

It was the home of a statue created by Jan Fabre called Searching for Utopia.

In 1999, the Stadshalle Grain Hall (market hall) with its belfry was inscribed on the UNESCO World Heritage List as part of the Belfries of Belgium and France site, owing to its historical civic (not religious) importance and its architecture.

== History ==
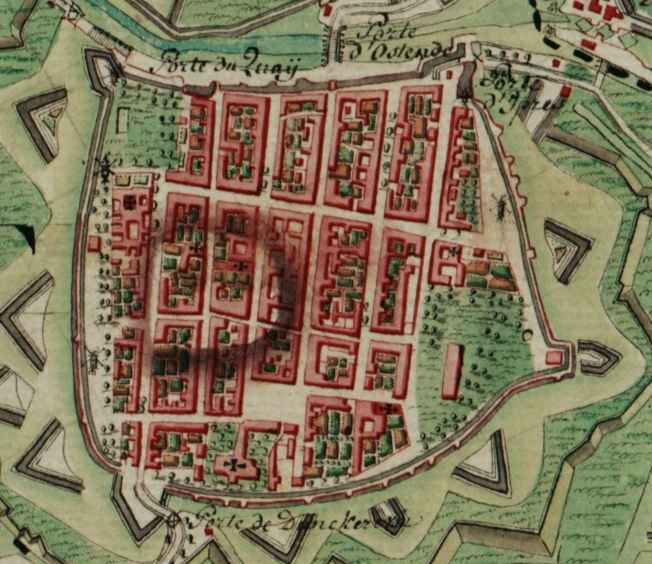
Nieuwpoort on the Ferraris map (c. 1775)

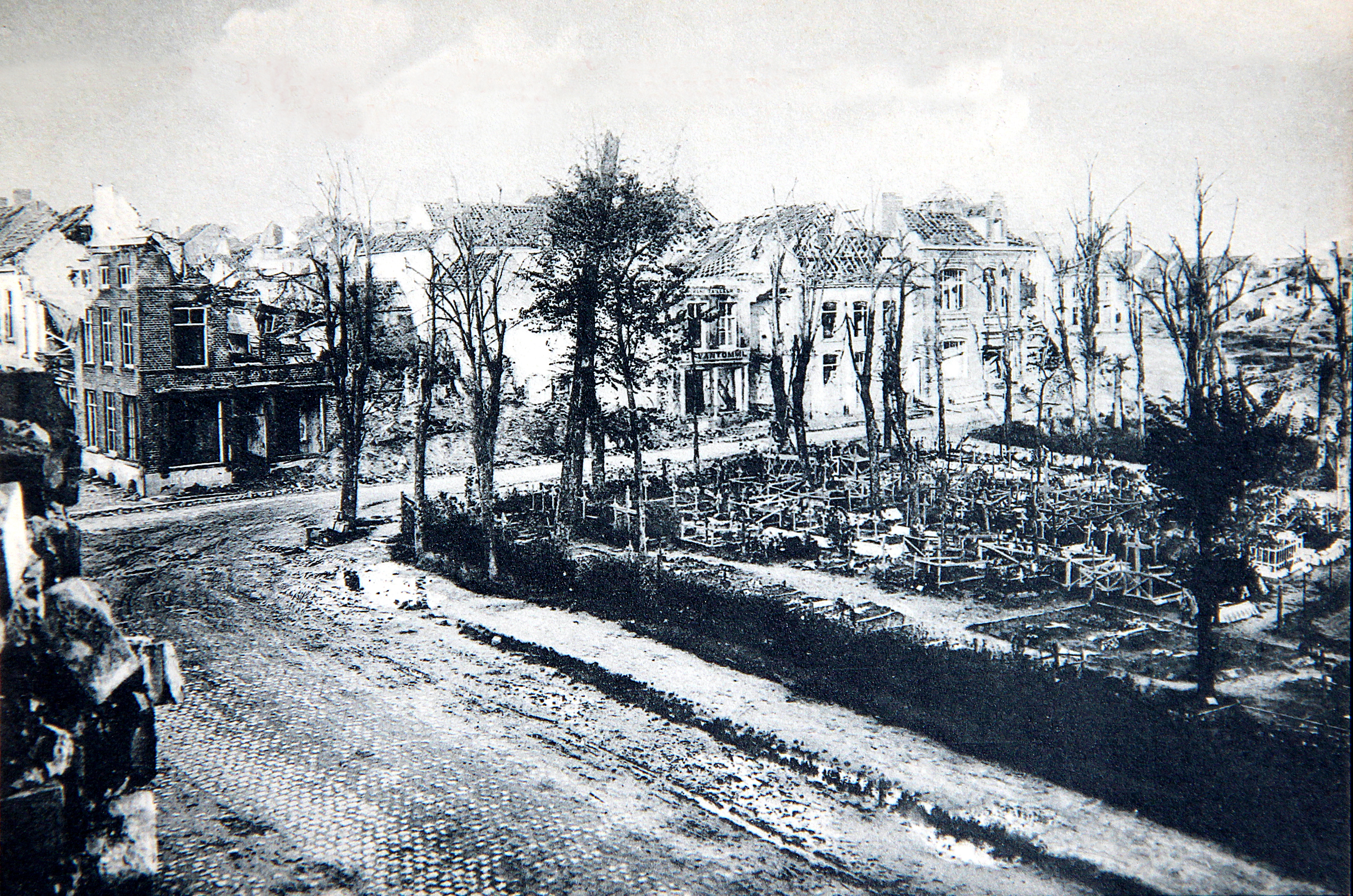
Destruction caused to the city of Nieuwpoort in November 1917

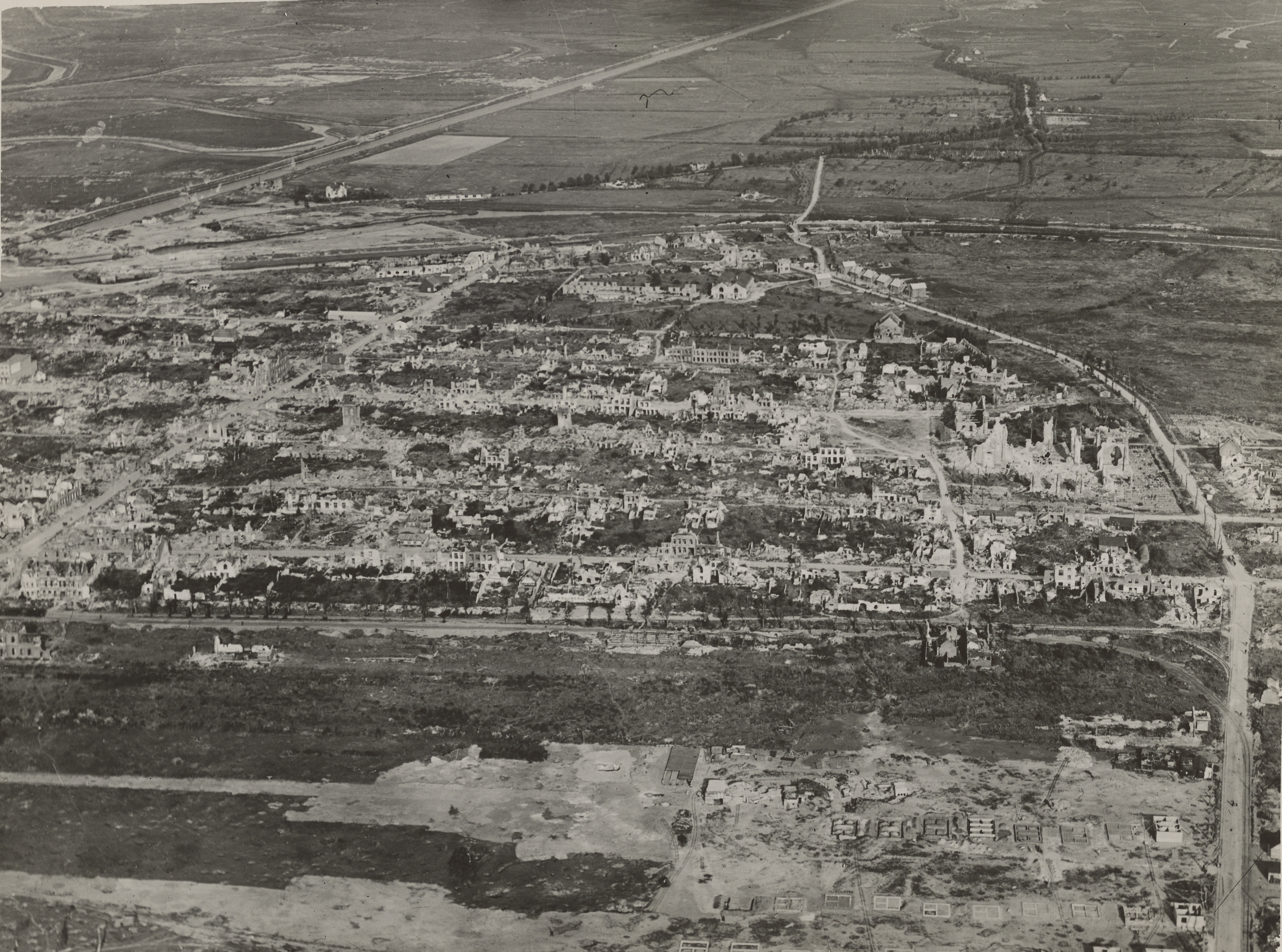
Damage in 1919

In 1163, Nieuwpoort obtained city rights from Count Philip of Flanders. The Battle of Nieuwpoort, between the Dutch and the Spanish, happened here in 1600. The city was a Dunkirker base.

In the 17th century, painter Victor Boucquet made two of the altar-pieces for the great church.

In 1671, Antonio Vélaz de Medrano, 1st Marquess of Tabuérniga became governor of the city.

Between 1757 and 1763, for a period of 6 years, the city was occupied by French forces as part of the conditions of the Second Treaty of Versailles between France and Austria.

In the 19th century, a large waterworks infrastructure project called the Ganzepoot (goose foot, in Dutch) was constructed in Nieuwpoort to drain the polders and channel water in and around the town and to the North Sea.

During the Battle of the Yser, part of the First Battle of Ypres in World War I, Hendrik Geeraert opened the sluice gates on the mouth of the river Yser twice to flood the lower lying land, thus halting the German advance. Two World War I monuments (next to each other), the Nieuport Memorial and King Albert I Memorial, are in close proximity of the Ganzepoot.

== Towns ==
The old city centre of Nieuwpoort is located about 3 km (1.9 mi) from the coast. Close to the sea, a new tourist centre has developed. Both parts form one contiguous built up area, connected by buildings along the Albert I Laan street and the fishing port.

Besides Nieuwpoort proper, two small villages in the Flemish polders are part of the municipality: Sint-Joris; and Ramskapelle.

#	Name	Area	Population 1999
I	Nieuwpoort	10,18	9.437
II	Sint-Joris	5,54	259
III	Ramskapelle	15,28	555

Nieuwpoort is located by the sea. At the coastal line, it borders the municipalities Koksijde at its town Oostduinkerke and Middelkerke at its town Lombardsijde. Because the territory of the town of Ramskapelle expands far inland, Nieuwpoort has a large number of neighbouring towns, most of which are part of two large municipalities:

Nieuwpoort, towns, and neighbouring towns. The yellow areas are urban areas.

- a. Lombardsijde (Middelkerke)
- b. Westende (Middelkerke)
- c. Slijpe (Middelkerke)
- d. Mannekensvere (Middelkerke)
- e. Schore (Middelkerke)
- f. Pervijze (Diksmuide)
- g. Veurne
- h. Booitshoeke (Veurne)
- i. Wulpen (Koksijde)
- j. Oostduinkerke (Koksijde)

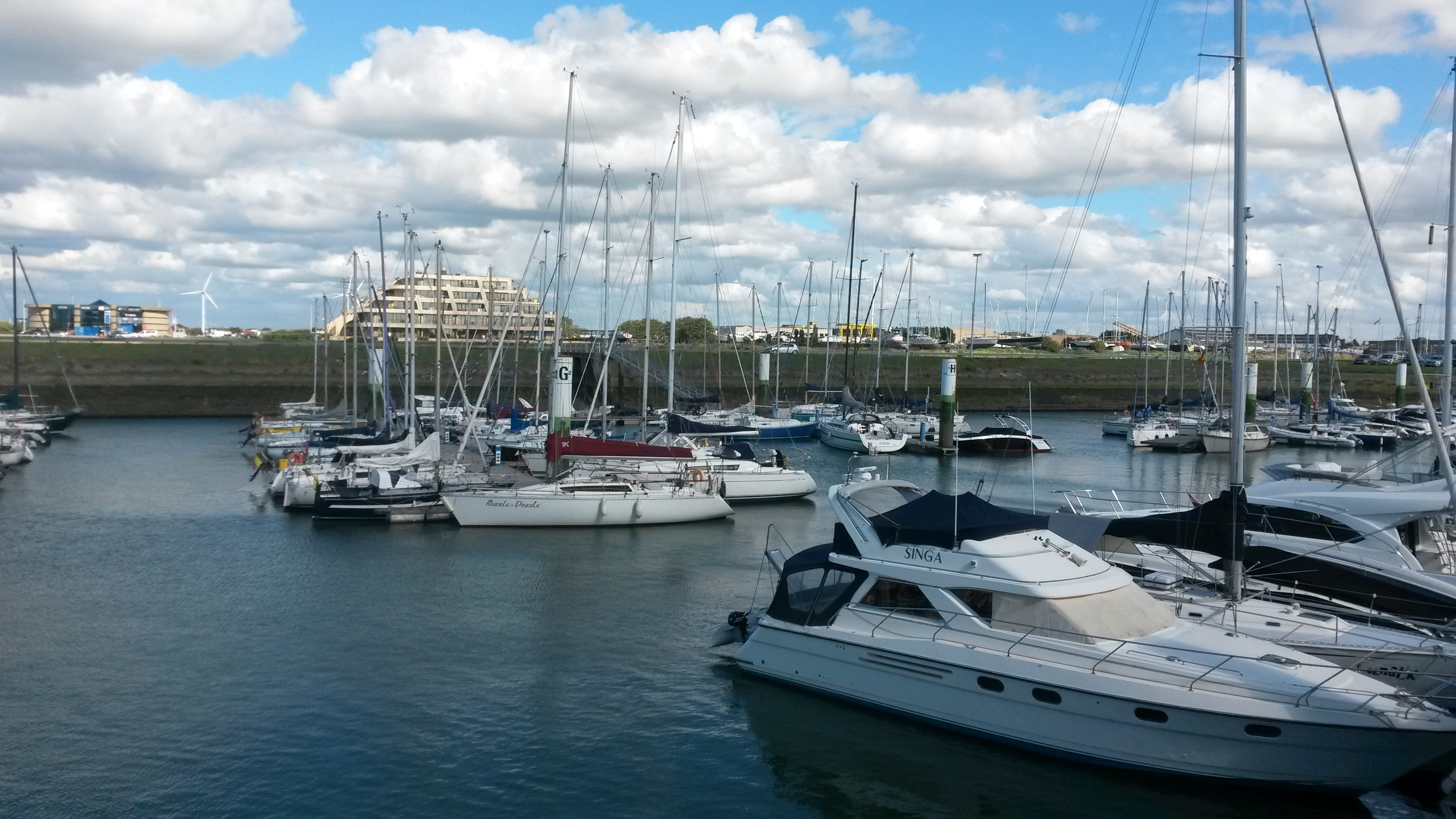
A view of Nieuwpoort marina from the south side with boats

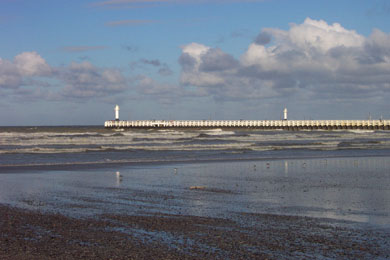
A view of the beach and the pier at Nieuwpoort

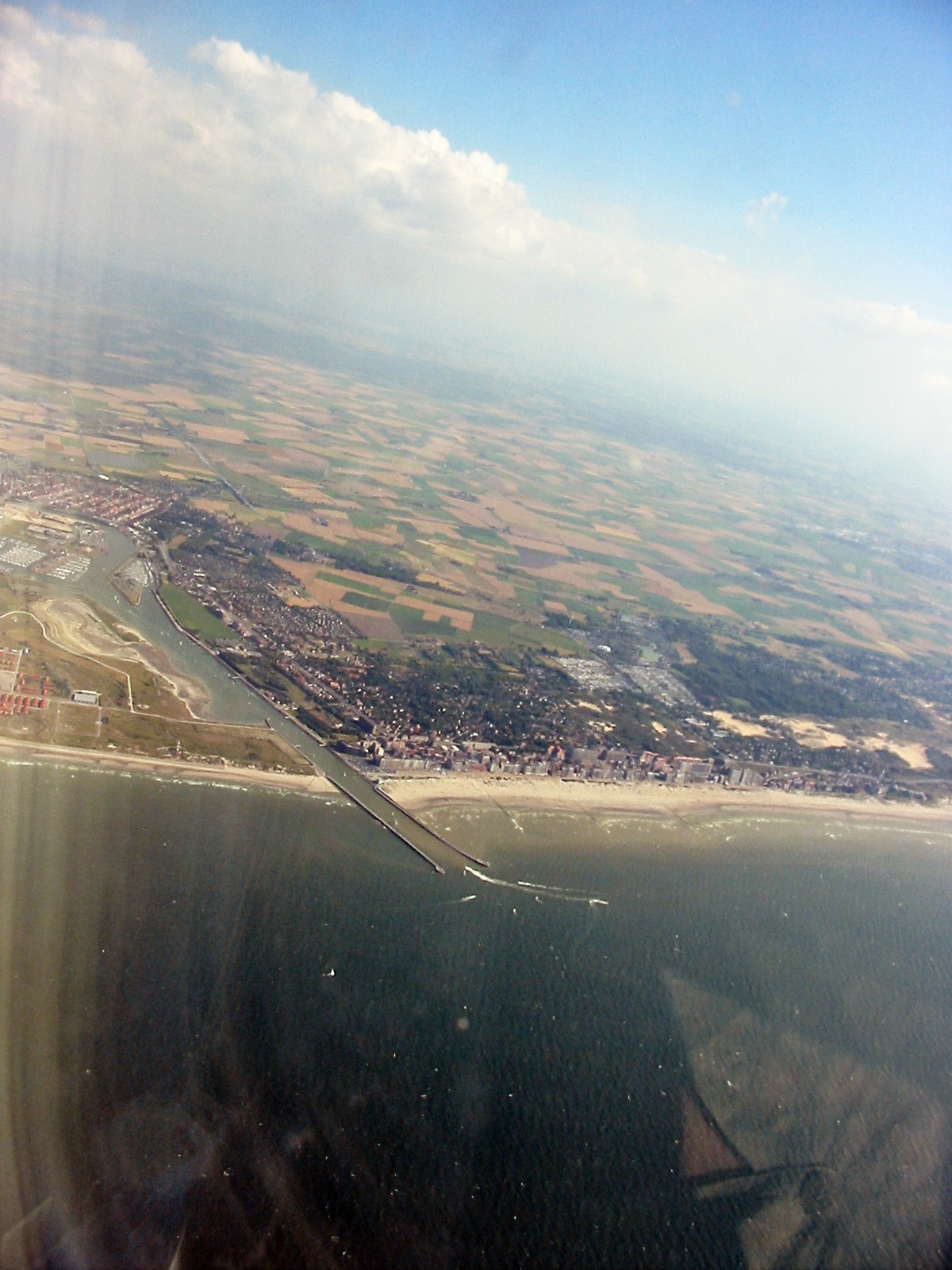
Nieuwpoort taken from the air

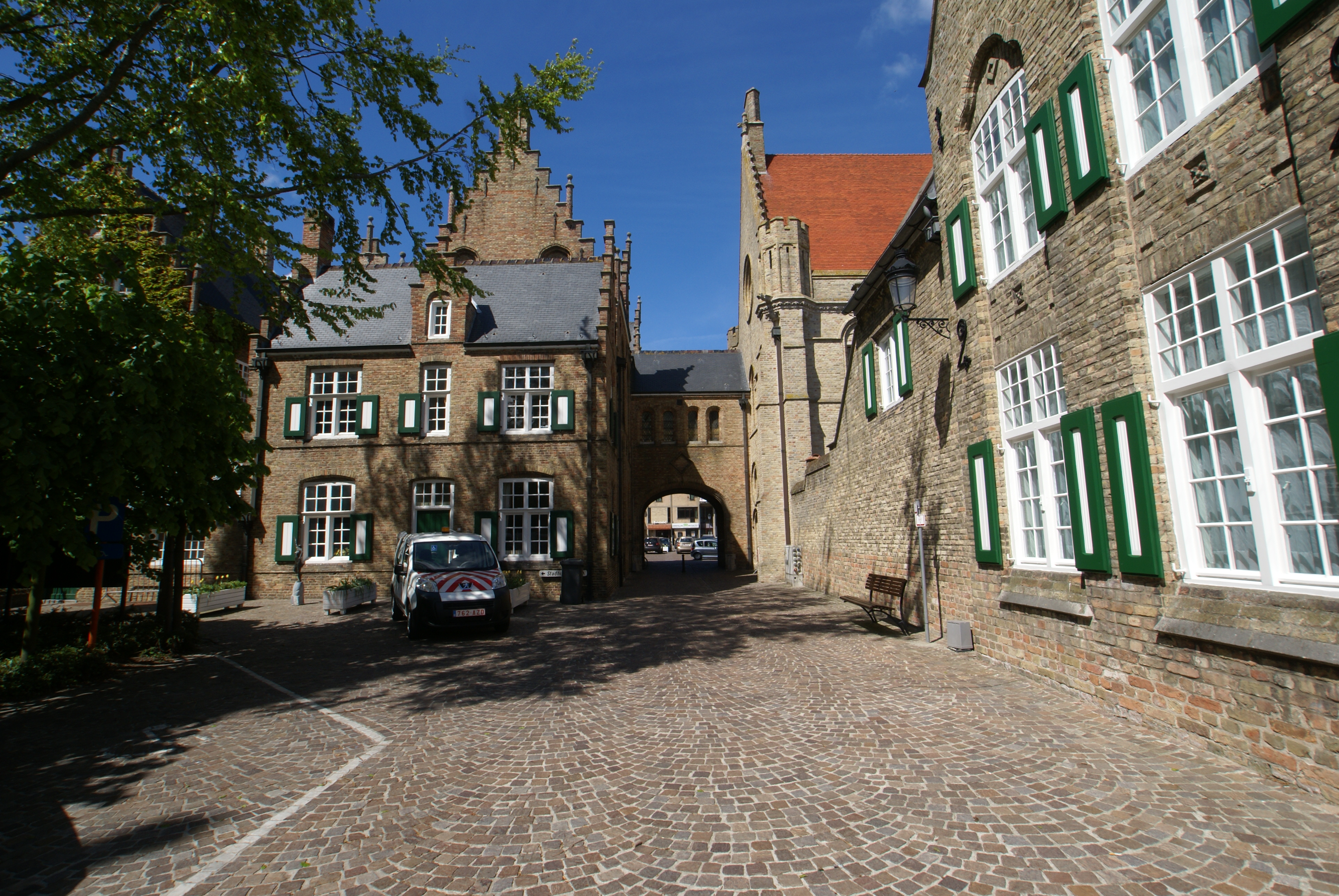
Hendrik-Geeraertplein square

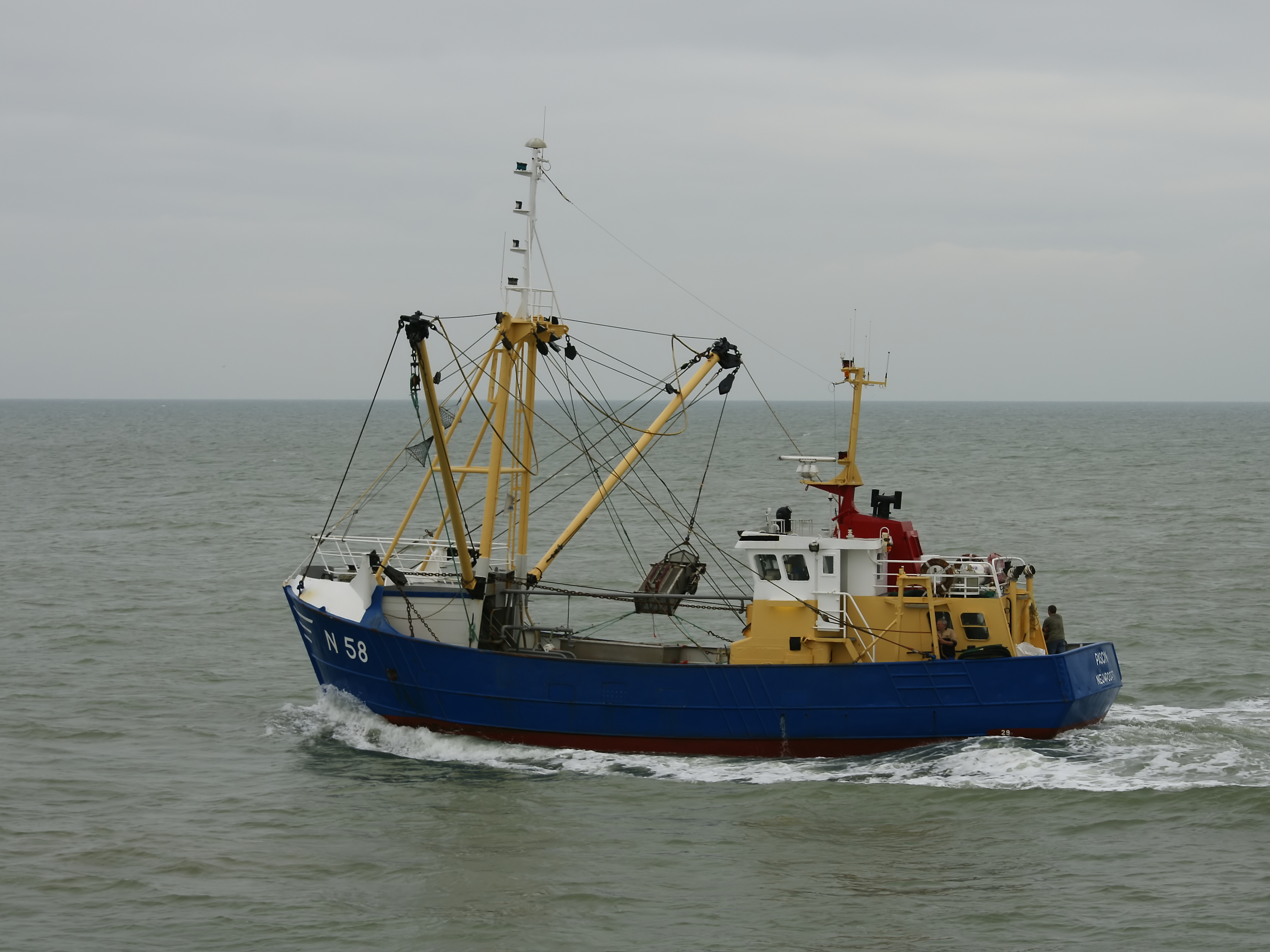
Fishing ship from Nieuwpoort

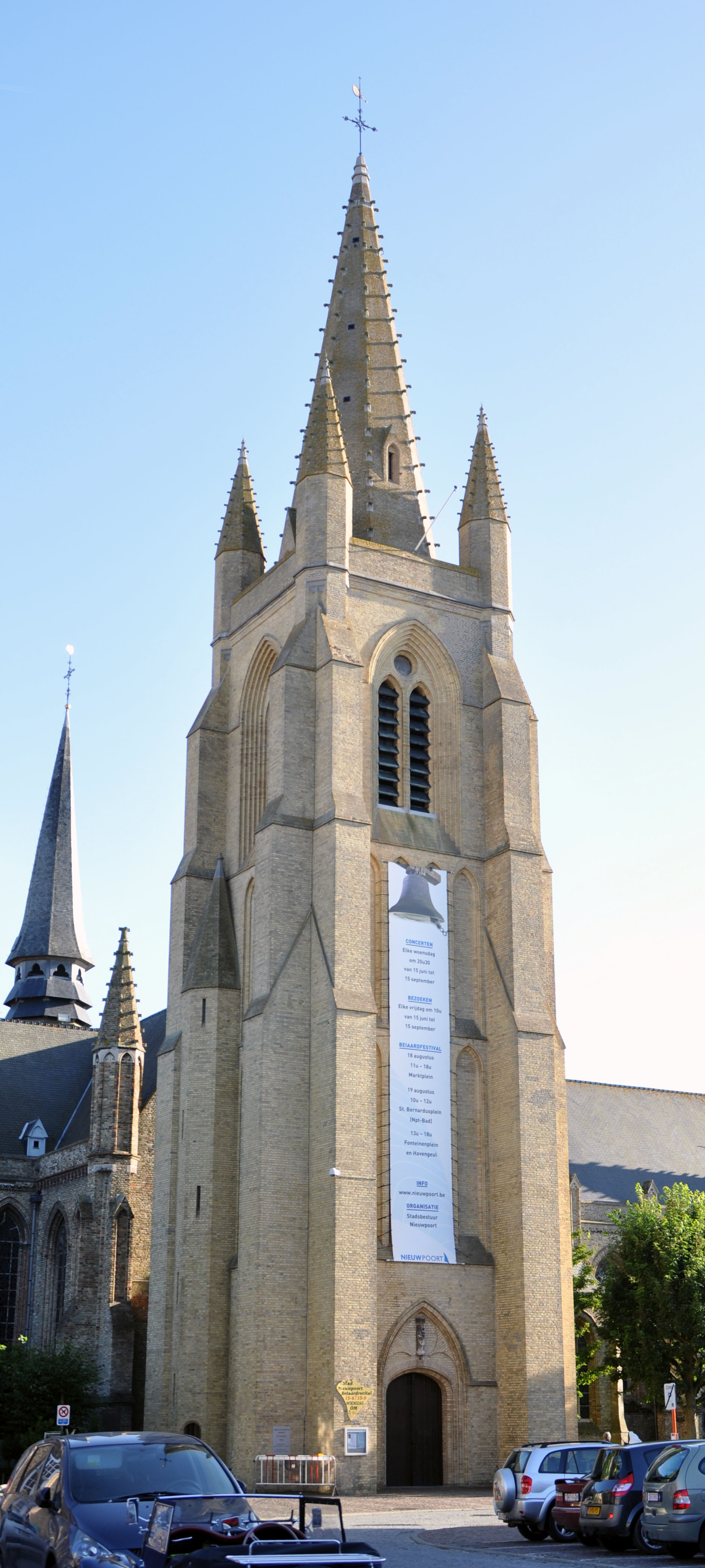
Tower of the Notre-Dame church in Nieuwpoort

== In literature ==
Part of the plot in Cecelia Holland's historical novel The Sea Beggars is laid in Nieuwpoort, in the preliminary states of the Eighty Years' War - with the sailor protagonists feeling oppressed under the harsh Spanish rule and eventually joining the rebellious Watergeuzen.

== Notable people ==
- Jean-Marie Dedecker (born 1952), Belgian politician
- Dixie Dansercoer (1962–2021), Belgian explorer
- Alain Desaever (1952–2014), Belgian racing cyclist
- Freddy Maertens (born 1952), Belgian racing cyclist
- Olivier Marteel (born 1969), Belgian snooker referee
- Jan Simoen (born 1953), Belgian footballer
- Jeline Vandromme (born 2007), Belgian tennis player

== See also ==
- Operation Hush
