= IJzerbedevaart =

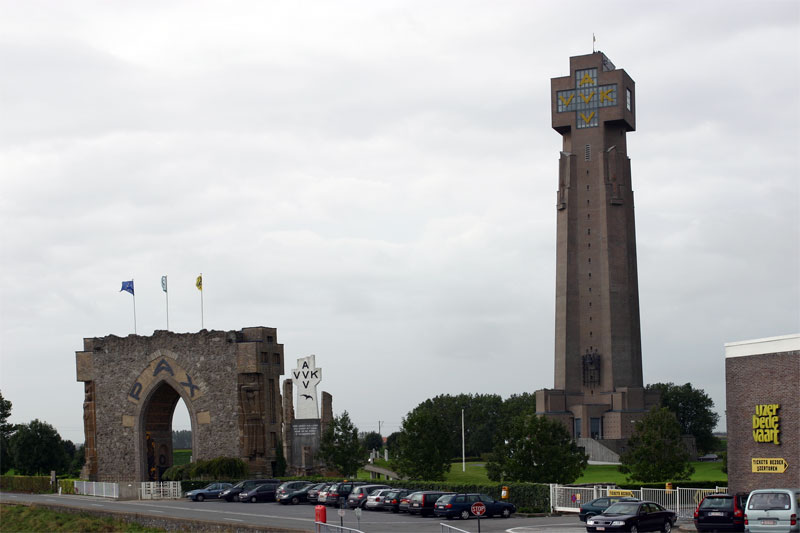
De IJzertoren in Diksmuide

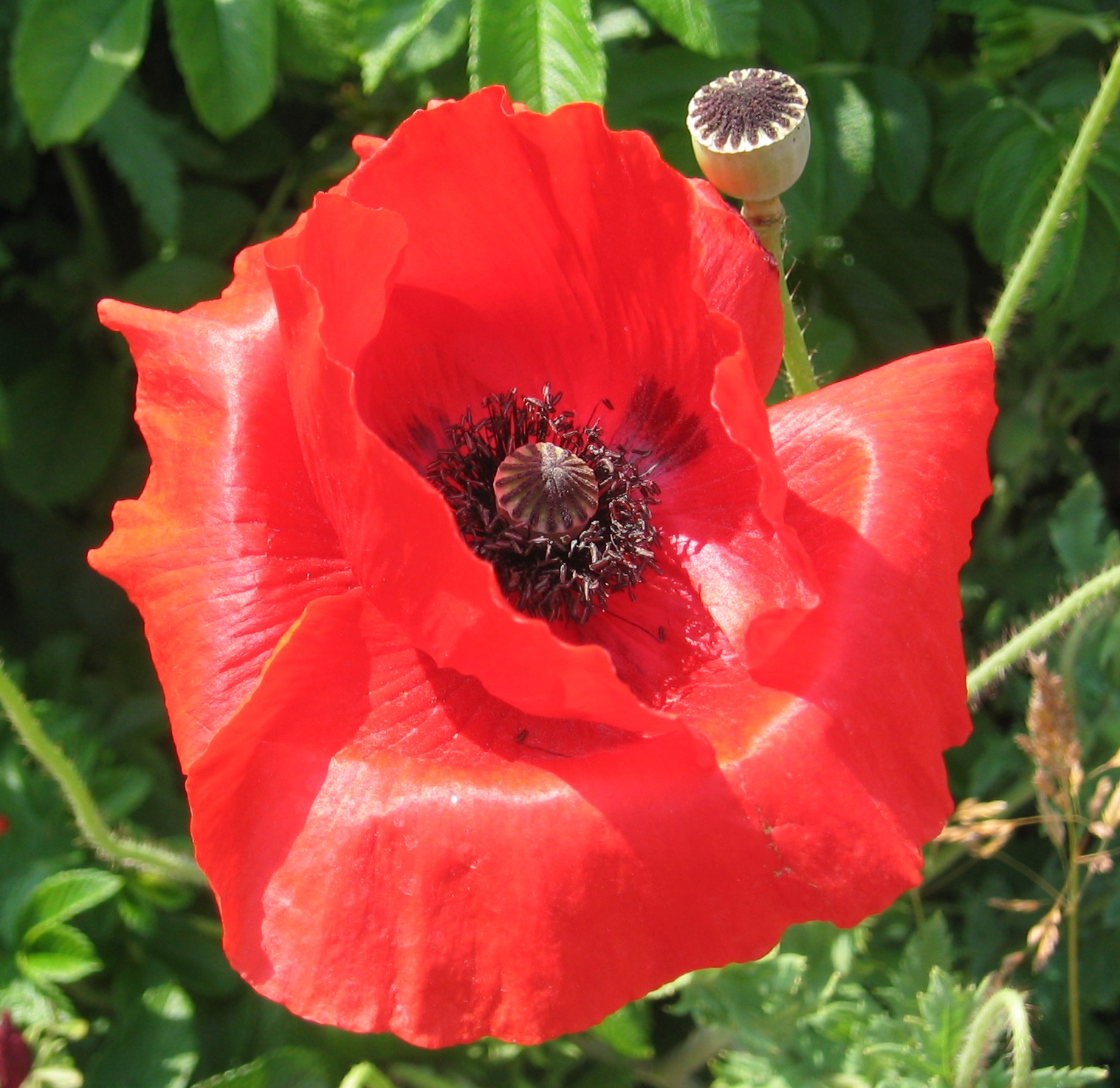
A poppy, symbol of the soldiers died at the IJzer

The Yser Pilgrimage (Dutch: IJzerbedevaart) is an annual gathering at the Yser Tower (IJzertoren) in Diksmuide, West Flanders in Belgium. This pilgrimage remembers the Flemish soldiers who died while serving in the Belgian Army during the First World War and was first organised in 1920. Initially influenced by pacifism, it became increasingly associated with the Flemish Movement. It is at the same time a political meeting striving for Flemish political autonomy. The motto of the annual meeting is "No More War", "Autonomy" and "Truce of God".

During the Second World War the pilgrimages were organised by the German occupying forces. Because of this link that still persists, Diksmuide became a gathering place of neo-Nazis from all over Europe during the weekend of the IJzerbedevaart. The IJzerbedevaart had hard times avoiding the publicity to be associated with their armed forces.

The Committee organising the IJzerbedevaart countered by making its message more radical and more modern at the same time. They tried to do this by clearly stressing the original aims dating back to the First World War (No more War, Autonomy, and Truce of God), and by rephrasing these aims to values of present-day interest (Peace, Freedom and Tolerance). They also diversified their activities to a.o. the museum in the IJzertoren and a music festival for peace (Ten Vrede).

Some participants did not agree with both the abolishing of the Second World War blemish and the rephrasing of the message. They first tried to take over the organisation, and in 1996 they even physically attacked the president during the IJzerbedevaart. This profound discord further harmed the reputation of the pilgrimage. Eventually the dissenters, who consider themselves to be more radical, split off and formed the IJzerwake.

== See also ==
- Frontpartij
- In Flanders Fields
