= Lombardsijde =

Coordinates: 51°09′N 2°45′E

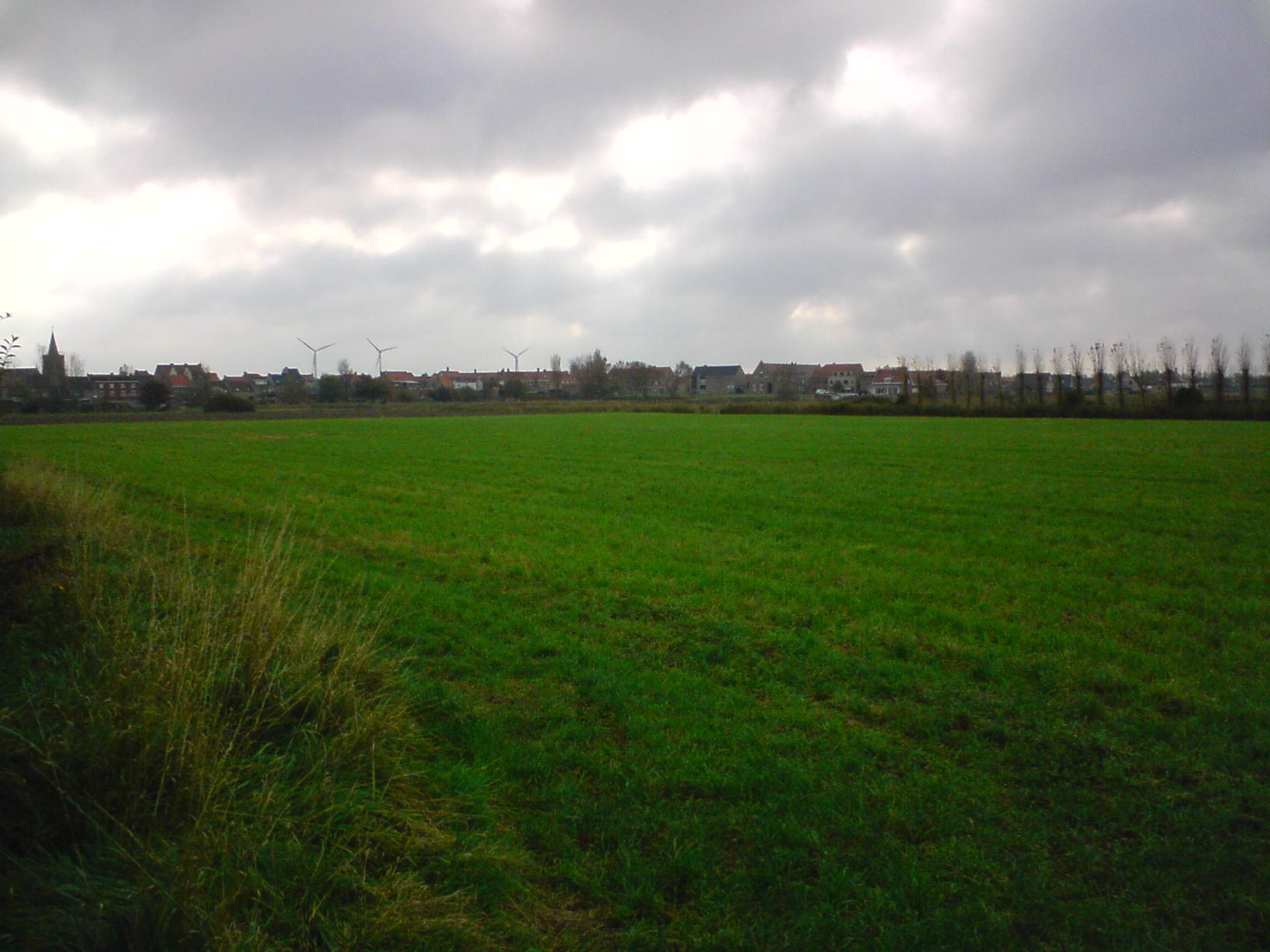
Lombardsijde Village

Lombardsijde, also Lombartzyde, is a district in the Belgian municipality of Middelkerke in West Flanders province, in northwestern Belgium near Nieuwpoort.

Fighting occurred in and around Lombardsijde during World War I.
