= Van Raemdonck brothers =

Two siblings who were killed while serving in the Belgian Army in WW1

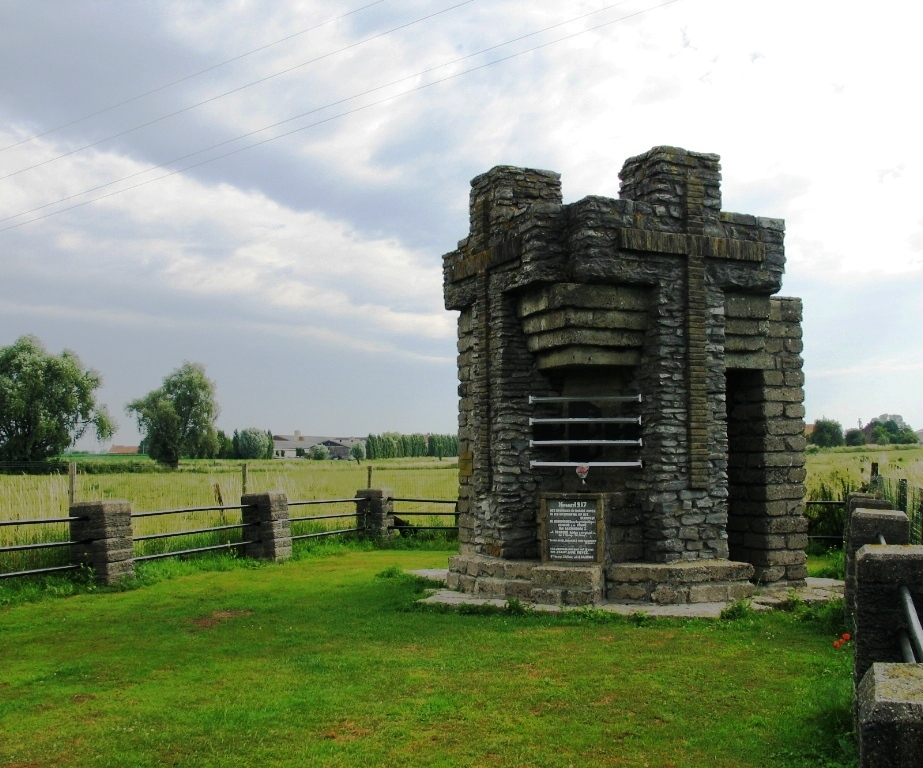
Monument to the Van Raemdonck brothers near Zuidschote

Edward and Frans Van Raemdonck were two siblings killed while serving in the Belgian Army in World War I whose story subsequently became prominent within the popular memory of the conflict in post-war Flanders.

Born in Temse in East Flanders in 1895 and 1897 respectively, Edward and Frans volunteered for service in the Belgian Army at the time of the German invasion of Belgium in August 1914 and were serving together in the 6th Company of the 24th Line Regiment (24. Linieregiment) when they were killed in an attack on the hamlet of Stampkot, near Steenstrate, on the Yser Front in the night of 25–26 March 1917, aged 21 and 19 respectively.

In the aftermath of the conflict, the deaths of the "Brothers Van Raemdonck" (Gebroeders Van Raemdonck) became part of Flemish popular mythology as a result of its symbolism of brotherly love and self-sacrifice. Their flamingant views and the supposed indifference to their fate among their French-speaking officers meant that it became increasingly associated with the Flemish Movement in post-war Belgium. Aspects of the historical brothers were re-written to better fit the emerging narrative. According to the myth, the two brothers had died in one another's arms while Frans's body had actually been discovered in the arms of a Walloon corporal Amé Fiévez a short distance from Edward's body.

The brothers' fate was widely commemorated in monuments over following years and the brothers were symbolically reburied at the Yser Towers (IJzertoren) in 1932 and was an important part of the annual Yser Pilgrimage (IJzerbedevaart).
