= Yser =

River in northern France and western Belgium

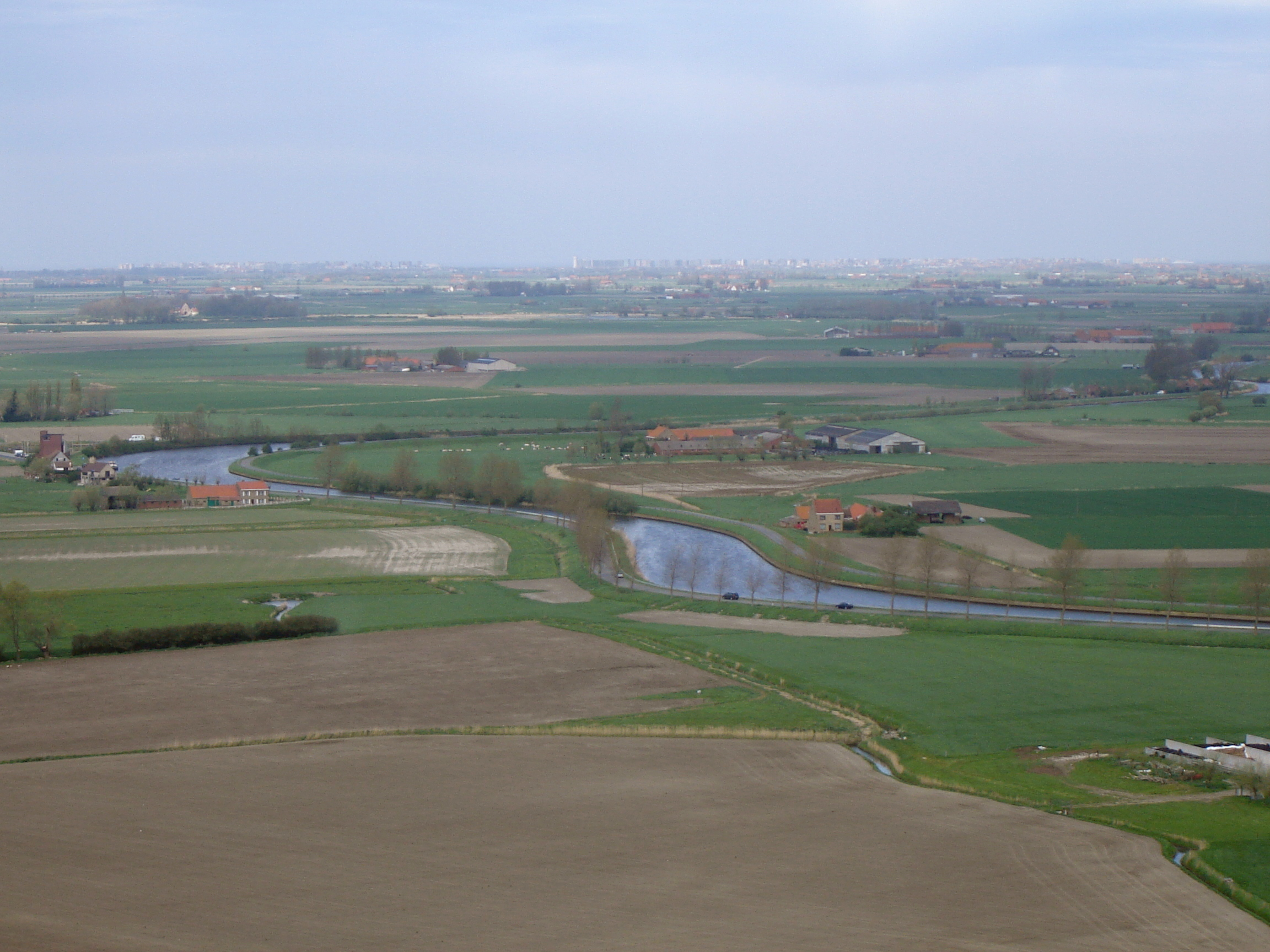
- The Yser and West Flemish polders near Diksmuide

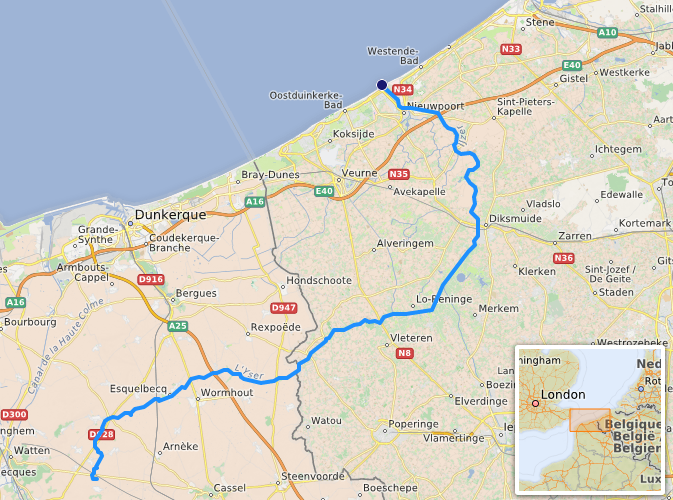
- Native name: Yser (Picard); IJzer (Dutch)

Location
- Countries: Belgium and France

Physical characteristics
- Source
  - location: Nord
  - elevation: 30 m (98 ft)
- Mouth
  - location: North Sea
  - coordinates: 51°9′10″N 2°43′23″E
- Length: 78 km (48 mi)
- Basin size: 1,101 km^{2} (425 mi^{2})
- Discharge
  - average: 3 m^{3}/s (110 cu ft/s)

The Yser (US: /iːˈzɛər/ ee-ZAIR, French: [izɛʁ]; Dutch: Ĳzer [ˈɛizər]) is a river that rises in French Flanders (the north of France), enters the Belgian province of West Flanders and flows through the Ganzepoot and into the North Sea at the town of Nieuwpoort.

The source of the Yser is in Buysscheure (Buisscheure), in the Nord department of northern France. It flows through Bollezeele (Bollezele), Esquelbecq (Ekelsbeke), and Bambecque (Bambeke). After approximately 30 kilometres (19 mi) of its 78-kilometre (48 mi) course, it leaves France and enters Belgium. It then flows through Diksmuide and out into the North Sea at Nieuwpoort.

During the Battle of the Yser in the First World War, by opening the sluices, part of the polder west of the Yser was flooded with seawater between Nieuwpoort and Diksmuide to provide an obstacle to the advancing German Army and keep westernmost Belgium safe from German occupation. The Yser river itself never overflowed its banks.

== Basin ==
The basin covers 1101 km^{2} and is two-thirds located in Belgium. A ridge in France forms the watershed line with the Aa basin in the west; in the south and east, the West Flemish Hills and the Central West Flemish Hills form the boundary with the Lys basin; in the north, a line of dunes is the boundary with the North Sea coast.

The Yser rises west of Cassel in northern France and has two official sources, at Buisscheure and Lederzele. It is fed there by the Penebeek (Peene Becque), the Vuilebeek (Sale Becque) and the Herzele (Herzeele). The Zwijnebeek (Zwyne Becque) on the left bank and the Heidebeek (Ey Becque) on the right bank form the border between France and Belgium for a long time. In Belgium, the Poperinge canal, Kemmelbeek, Lovaart, Ieperlee and Handzamevaart join the river. The Yser flows into the North Sea at Nieuwpoort (B) via the Ganzepoot lock complex.

== History ==
The area between the Yser and the coast was Veurne-Ambacht in the Middle Ages. At the end of the 16th century this came into Spanish hands and a few settlements/forts were erected along the Yser against plundering by reformers from Ostend. These largely lost their function after the fall of Ostend in 1604. After the Peace of Aachen, Veurne came into French hands and the Yser formed a northern border of the French empire. Fortifications were built again, such as Fort Knokke. After the Treaty of Utrecht, the area belonged to the Austrian Netherlands. There were still some barrier towns in the area, but the Yser eventually lost its border function.

The river was part of the front line during World War I and was the scene of trench warfare, with the Belgian and German armies dug in along both sides of the river. The Belgian army was able to hold out here for the rest of the war after the Battle of the Yser in 1914 following the inundation of part of the Yser plain, at the suggestion of the Veurn investigating judge and with the cooperation of Karel Cogge and Hendrik Geeraert. Further inland, the Allied lines were manned by British and French troops. As in other places in the region, terrible scenes took place in which each other's positions were taken and recaptured again and again at a high price in human lives. Along the Yser, several monuments and sites recall the war, including the Yser Tower and the Death March in Diksmuide.

In May 1940, the French and English allies blew up all the bridges and locks again.

== Etymology ==
Like some other names in Flanders, the name IJzer is of Celtic origin, as the Celtic Menapii lived in the area before the Roman times (see also the Isar in Germany, the Jizera in Bohemia and the Isère in France) before assimilation by the Franks.

== Tributaries ==
The main tributaries of the Yser are:

- Peene Becque (Penebeek)
- Sale Becque (Vuilebeek)
- Ey Becque (Heidebeek)
- Zwyne Becque (Zwijnebeek)
- Vleeterbeek
