= Stuivekenskerke =

Coordinates: 51°05′N 2°49′E

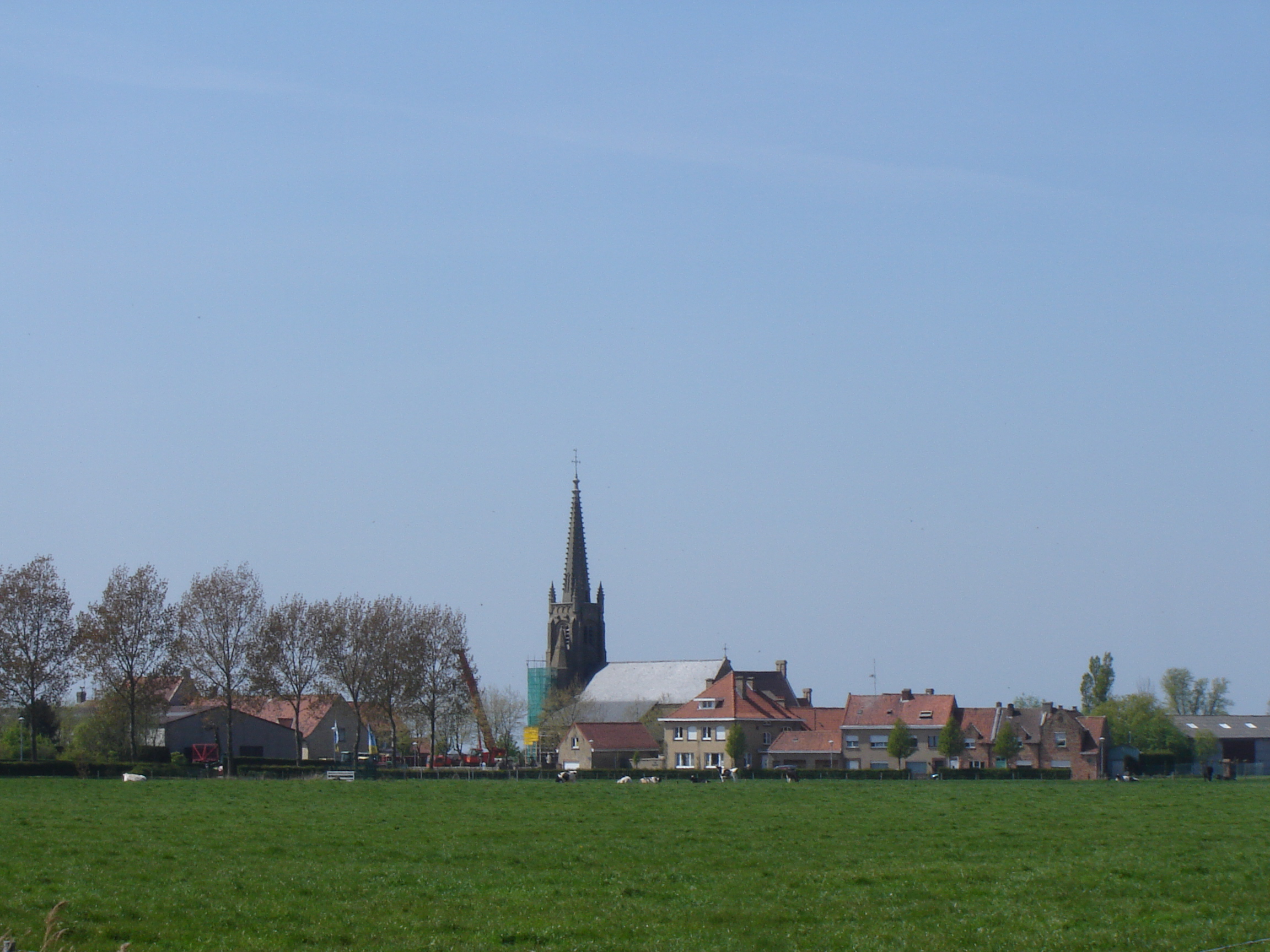
- Interactive map of Stuivekenskerke

Area
  - Total: 734 km^{2} (283 sq mi)

Population (1 January 2007)
  - Total: 160
  - Density: 0.22/km^{2} (0.56/sq mi)
- Postal code: 8600

Stuivekenskerke is a district of the town of Diksmuide, in the Belgian province of West Flanders. Located on the Yser river, until 1970 it was an independent municipality and then merged and became a sub-municipality of Diksmuide. Stuivekenskerke, built in a polder, has an area of 7.34 km^{2} and had 160 inhabitants in 2007.

== History ==
=== Early and medieval history ===
In Roman times, the area consisted of mudflats and salt marshes, and already had a human presence. Floods coming in from the North Sea in the 4th century, and gradual flooding of the coastal area, rendered the area unfit for habitation. In 1161, the Norbertines of Vicoigne in Raismes became the owners of a sheepfold on a slightly elevated area surrounded by mudflats and marshes. This settlement would become a monastic domain, Viconia Kasteelhoeve; the area was encircled with dikes and became a fairly important center for sheep farming. Between 10 and 20 monks lived at the monastery, on a site 133 ha in size.

The first mention of the place name is from 1219; it says "parochia de Stuvinskerke in loco qui Vatha dicitur" ("the parish of Stuvinskerke in the place called Vate"). The "-kerke" ending indicates that the name can only have come into existence after the Christianization of the area, after the 11th century. The name supposedly comes from the Germanic "Stuvinas karika", or "Stuvin's church". Similar to other polder parishes, the name then comes from a local landowner, who founded a church and named it for himself.

On 18 March 994, the parish of Vladslo had been bequeathed by Radbod, bishop of Noyon and Tournai, to Saint Peter's Abbey, Ghent, and that abbey had patronage over Stuivekenskerke until 1802. This gift was confirmed in 1111, in a text that indicated that Stuivekenskerke was one of the daughter parishes (along with Keiem, Leke, Beerst, and Schore) that came from the mother parish Vladslo. Saint Peter was the patron saint. The Stuivekenskerke parish, though west of the Yser, was part of the Diocese of Tournai until 1559, when it was transferred to the Diocese of Bruges; neighboring villages on that side of the river belonged first to the Diocese of Thérouanne, and then to the Diocese of Ypres.

=== Under French rule ===
During the Ancien Régime, Stuivekenskerke belonged to the viscounty Veurne-Ambacht.

In the vicinity of Tervate and Stuivekenskerke, small fortifications were built by the Spaniards at the end of the 16th century, as a defense line against looting by reformists from Ostend. When the Siege of Ostend ended in 1604, these small fortresses soon disappeared.

The church had already received a new tower in 1572, and in 1643 it received a new northern aisle. At that time, the hamlet of Tervate also had a presence: on the Ferraris maps from around 1770–1778, this hamlet near a bridge over the Yser was of the same size as the center of Stuivekenskerke—which itself was accessible only from the north, via a single dead end country road. Several farms were nearby, some of which enclosed. The Viconia Monastery had a double wall and a mill. With the end of French rule, in 1794, the Norbertines were expelled and the property was sold. The local De Grave family first leased the terrain, and finally bought it.

=== 19th century, the village moves north ===
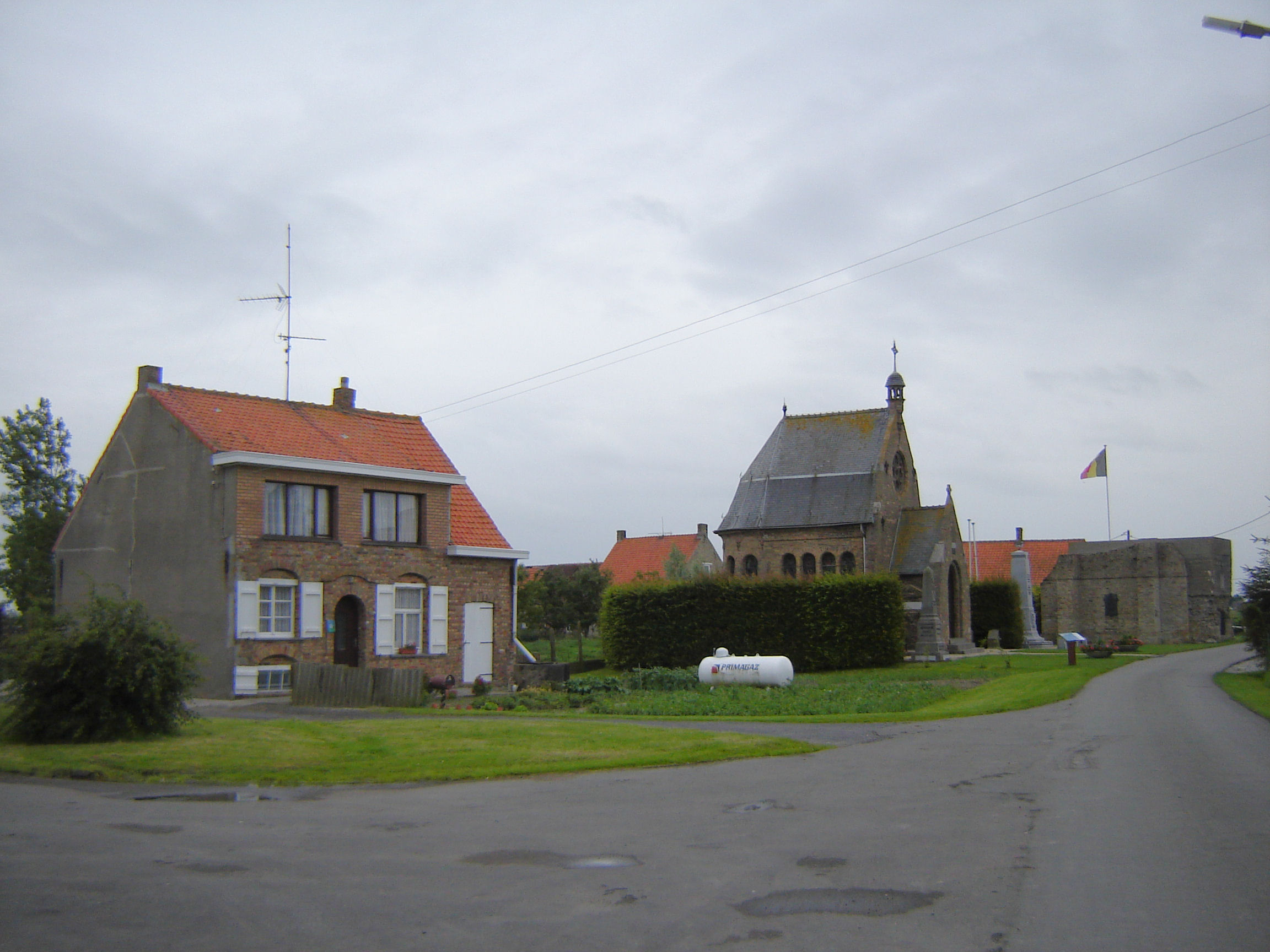
Oud-Stuivekenskerke, with the Onze-Lieve-Vrouwehoekje

At the end of the 19th century, the village moved, as a result of the construction of a new church. A restoration of the village's St. Peter's Church was to be too much work and so around 1866-1872 mayor J. B. de Graeve decided to have a new church built, two kilometers north of the village center, in the vicinity of his estate, the Viconia. In the following years, a new village center soon arose around this church, with a square, a school, a rectory, an inn and a grocery store. The old church was demolished, except for the tower, and the old village center decayed into a small hamlet, with a few small houses and a farm, called "Oud-Stuivekenskerke".

=== 20th century ===
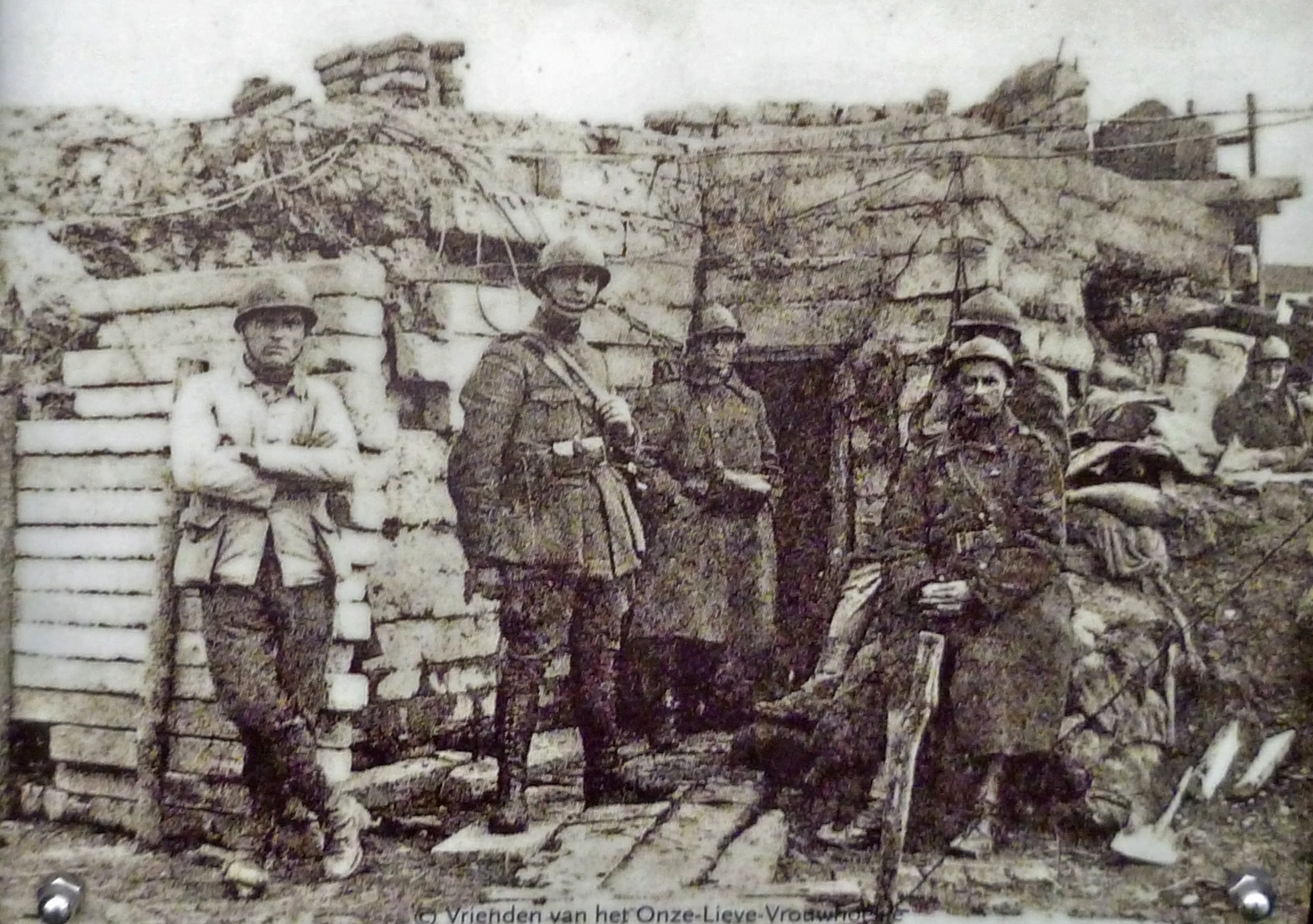
Belgian troops during World War 1, at Onze-Lieve-Vrouwehoekje

The village was hit hard in World War I. The battle for the Yser, the edge of the last part of Belgium not occupied by the Germans, started on 18 October 1914, and Diksmuide and Nieuwpoort came under attack the next day. The day after, the German army reached the Tervatebrug, and threatened to overrun allied positions and get straight to Dunkirk. By 25 October, the Germans had broken through the line, and the Belgian government decided to flood the entire area. When advanced German troops found water rising up behind their lines, they retreated behind the Yser. They took Diksmuide on 10 November, and when the first snow fell, they dug in, starting a lengthy trench war.

There were two important Belgian positions north of Diksmuide. Dodengang, a system of trenches where the Belgian and German armies were only meters away, was just north of Diksmuide, on the Yser. Next was Onze-Lieve-Vrouwehoekje ("the little corner of Mary"), at Out-Stuivekenskerke, a little over 1 kilometer from the Yser; because of the flooding, this had become an island. This important Belgian outpost ("The Great Guard South") was manned from December 1914 to May 1915 by the artillery observer Edouard Lekeux (Aarlen, 1884 - Luik, 1962), a reserve lieutenant and a Franciscan minorite, who moved to the Goemaere family farm after German artillery had leveled the church tower. A plaque in his honor was put up in 1963 in Oud-Stuivekenskerke. The Germans retreated from the area on October 15, 1918.

The St. Peter's Church, which had been destroyed in the war, was rebuilt in 1925, as was the Viconia estate. The Oud-Stuivekenserke landscape is dominated by the "Our Lady of Victory" chapel (1924-1925, by Veurne architect Camille Van Elslande), the ruined church tower from 1572, and the many military remembrances of World War I. The entire area was declared protected in 1993.

== Clay pits ==
After World War 2, clay was extracted in Stuivekenskerke, between the Viconia estate and the Yser; these clay pits, the Viconia Kleiputten, now form a 35 ha nature reserve with seven ponds. The area is a haven for birds, and at least 195 different species are found here.

== Places of interest ==
- St. Peter's Church
- Viconia Kasteelhoeve, rebuilt in 1925
- Onze-Lieve-Vrouwehoekje in Oud-Stuivekenskerke, with the ruined tower of the former St. Peter's church, and the memorial chapel Our Lady of Victory, with a demarcation pole with the inscription "Here the conqueror was brought to a halt"
- Viconia clay pits
- The boards of the Yser, in which mats woven from willow provide resting and mating areas for fish
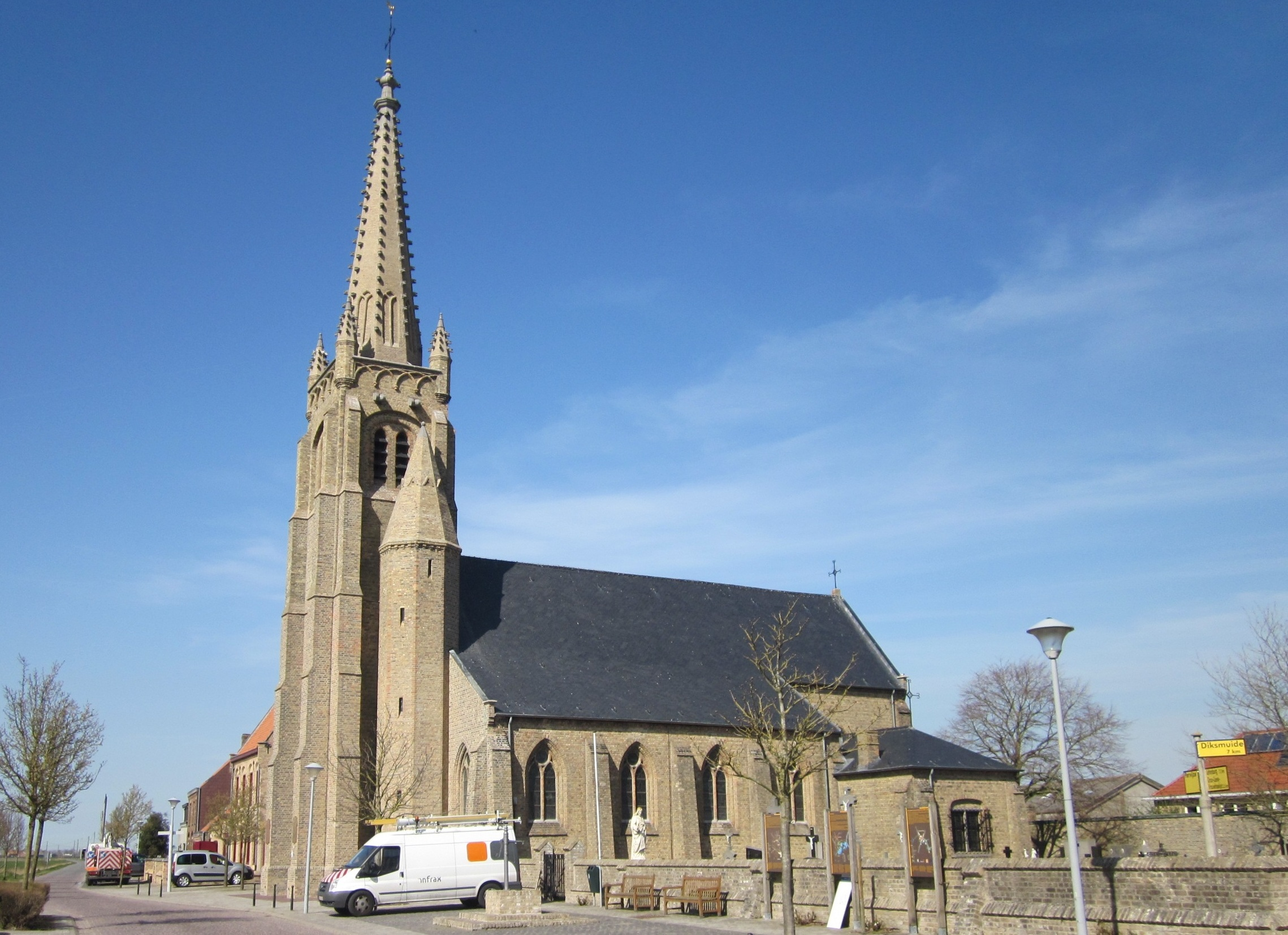
Saint Peter's church

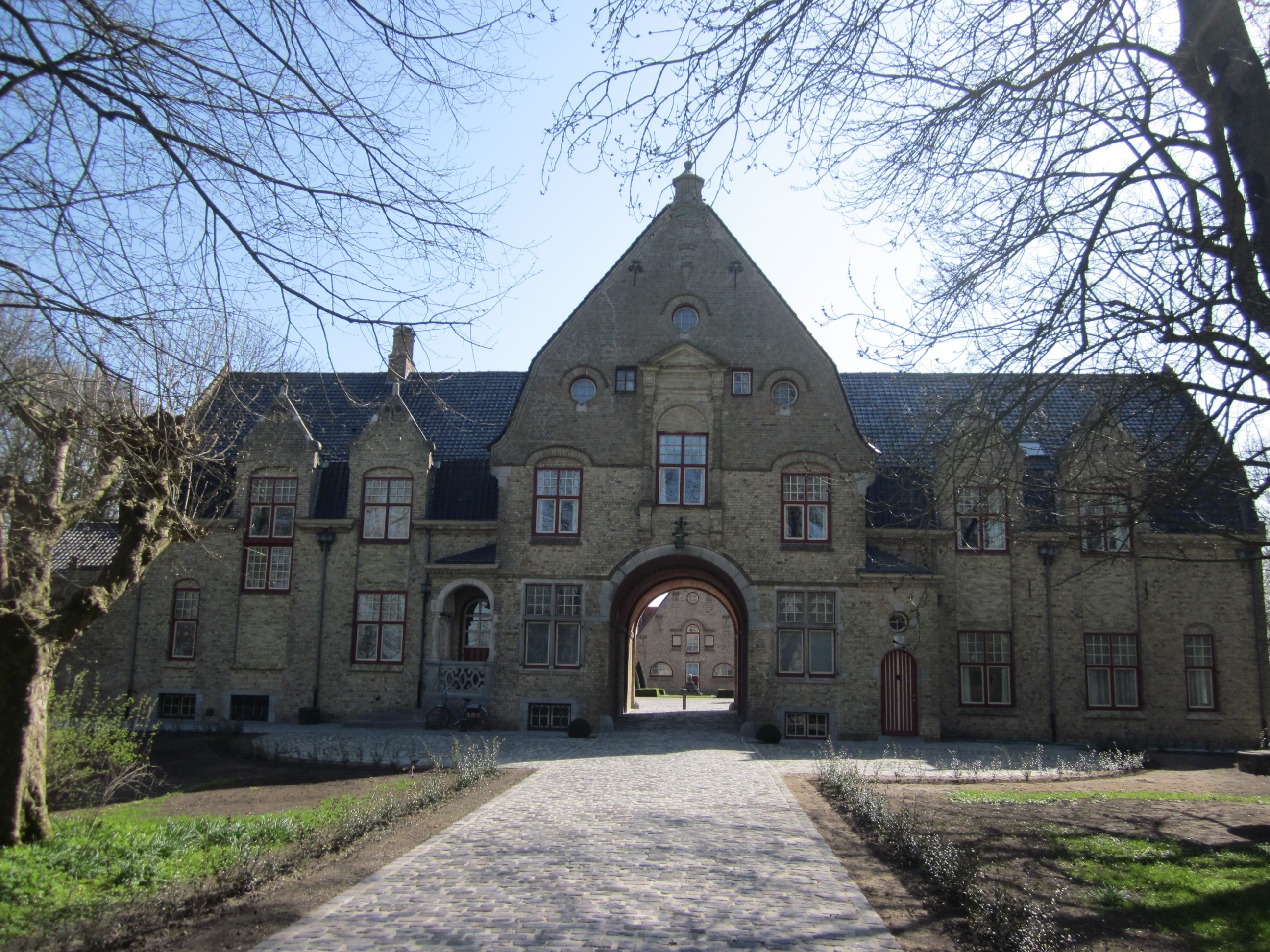
Viconia estate

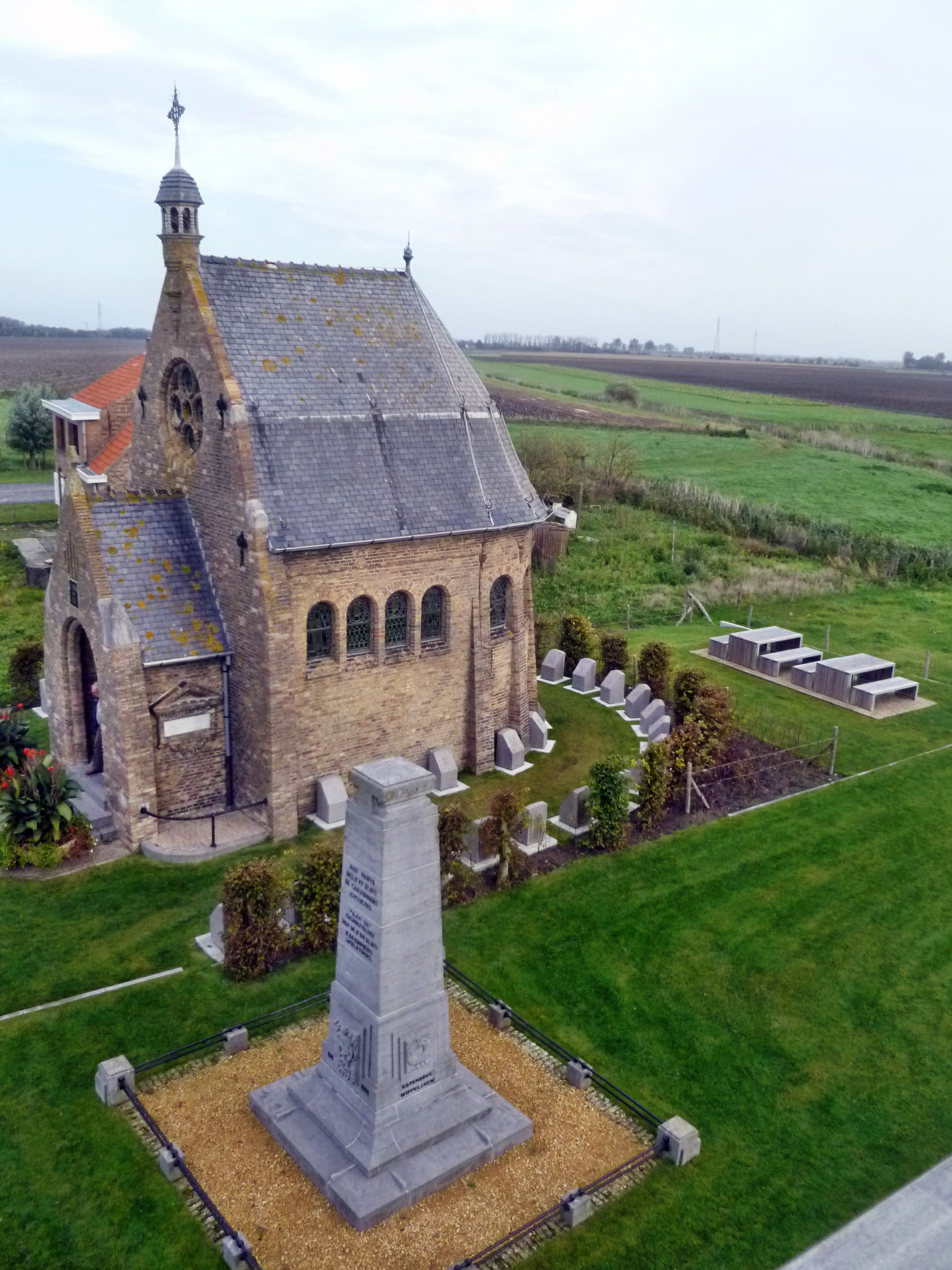
Onze-Lieve-Vrouwehoekje

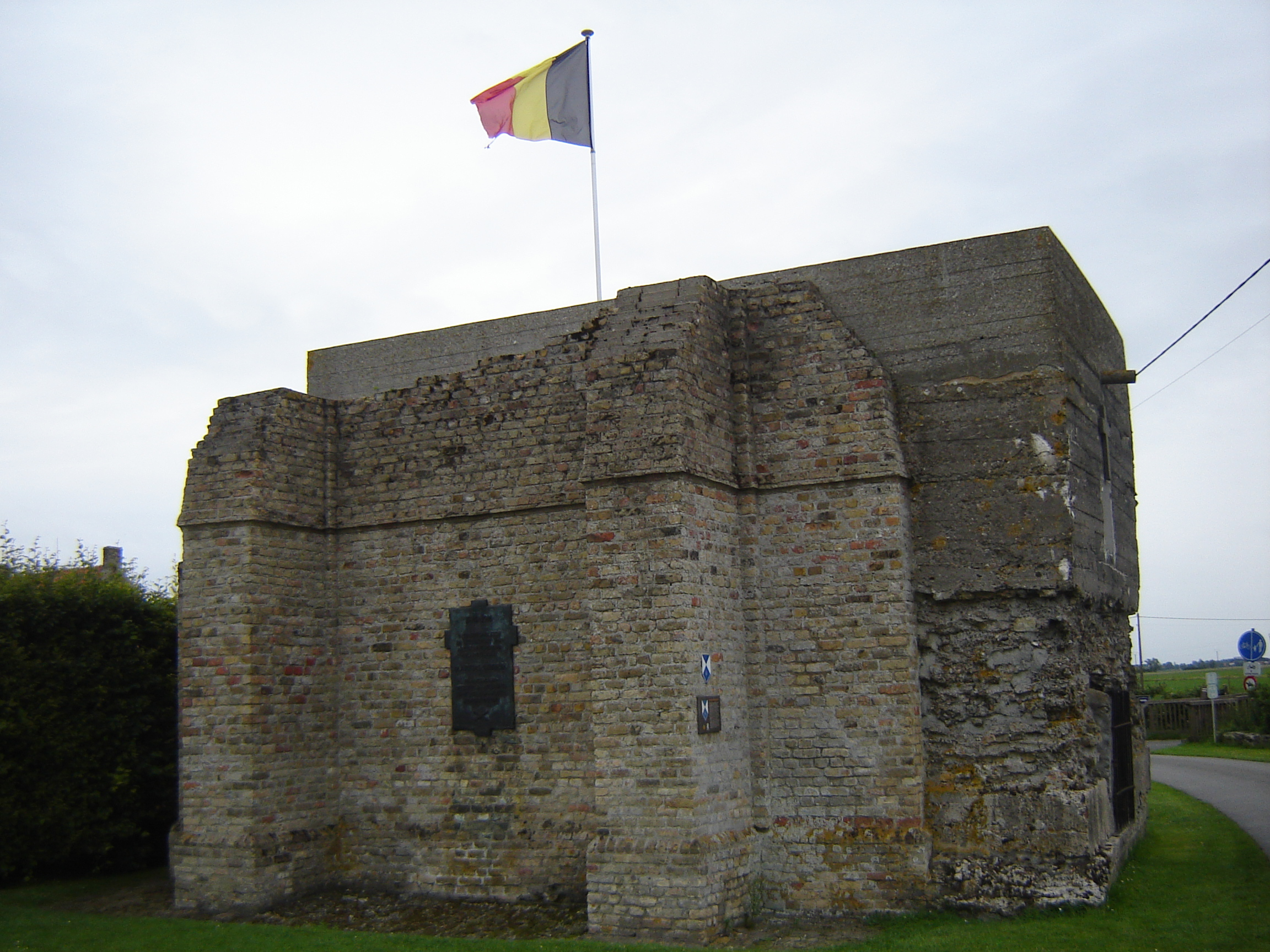
Ruined tower of Saint Peter's church

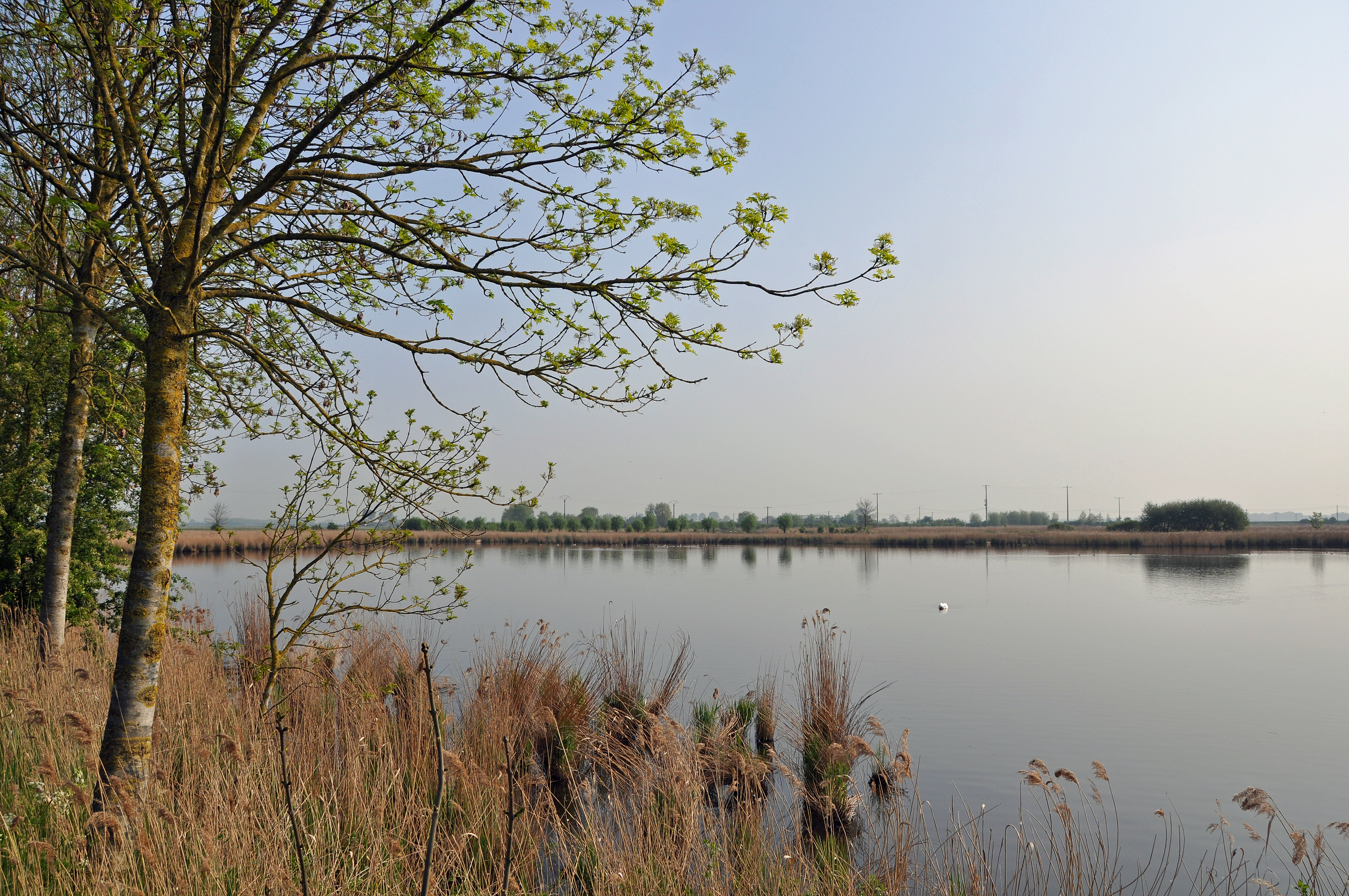
Viconia clay pits

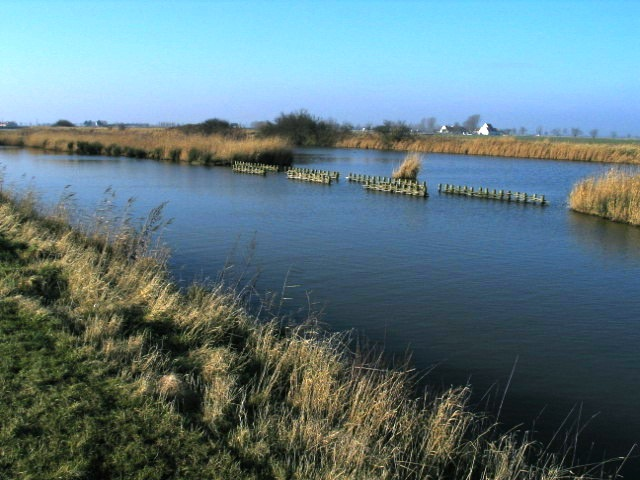
Mating area in the Yser (for fish)

== Modern administration ==
Formerly an independent municipality, in 1970 Stuivekenskerke merged with Pervijze, Lampernisse, and Oostkerke, and became sub-communes in the municipality of Diksmuide.

== Demographics ==
Historical population

Year	Pop.	±%
1806	329	—
1816	337	+2.4%
1830	361	+7.1%
1846	382	+5.8%
1856	391	+2.4%
1866	293	−25.1%
1876	362	+23.5%

Year	Pop.	±%
1880	362	+0.0%
1890	379	+4.7%
1900	349	−7.9%
1910	346	−0.9%
1920	149	−56.9%
1930	252	+69.1%
1947	282	+11.9%

Year	Pop.	±%
1961	203	−28.0%
1970	147	−27.6%
1981	166	+12.9%
1991	150	−9.6%
2001	157	+4.7%
2007	160	+1.9%

Source: NIS, www.westhoek.be and Stad Diksmuide. Note: 1806 -1991, numbers from the census; 2001 and 2007: inhabitants on January 1.
