= List of aerial victories of Gotthard Sachsenberg =

Gotthard Sachsenberg (1891-1961) was a German First World War fighter ace credited with 31 confirmed aerial victories. Flying as commander of Marine Feld-Jaeger I, he led his naval aviators over the English Channel as a German counterpart to the Royal Naval Air Service.

== List of victories ==
His victories are reported in chronological order, which is not necessarily the order or dates the victories were confirmed by headquarters.

This list is complete for entries, though obviously not for all details. Background data was abstracted from Above the Lines: The Aces and Fighter Units of the German Air Service, Naval Air Service and Flanders Marine Corps, 1914–1918, ISBN 978-0-948817-73-1, pp. 195–196, and The Aerodrome webpage on Gotthard Sachsenberg . Abbreviations were expanded by the editor creating this list.

No.	Date	Time	Foe	Unit	Location
1	1 May 1917		Farman	Belgian Air Force	Diksmuide (Dixmude), Belgium
2	1 May 1917		Sopwith 1½ Strutter	Belgian Air Force	Oudekapelle, Belgium
3	12 May 1917		Sopwith Pup	No. 4 Naval Squadron, RNAS	Off Zeebrugge, Belgium
4	7 June 1917		Royal Aircraft Factory FE.2d		St. Eloi, Belgium
5	7 June 1917		Sopwith Pup		Potyze
6	9 August 1917	1840 hours	SPAD S.VII		Northeast of Lampernisse
7	18 November 1917		Sopwith		Off Nieuwpoort (also known as Nieuport)
8	18 December 1917		Sopwith 1½ Strutter		Northwest of Keiem, Belgium
9	17 March 1918		Bréguet 14		Pervijze, Belgium
10	25 April 1918		Sopwith two-seater		Avekapelle
11	21 May 1918		Airco DH.4	No. 211 Squadron RAF	Off Mariakerke, Belgium
12	29 May 1918		Airco DH.9		Southwest of Nieuwkapelle
13	2 June 1918		SPAD		Off Middelkerke, Belgium
14	12 June 1918		Airco DH.9		Off Ostend, Belgium
15	13 July 1918	2135 hours	SPAD		Off Westende, Belgium
16	16 July 1918	1415 hours	SPAD		Off Zeebrugge, Belgium
17	16 July 1918	1420 hours	Airco DH.9	No. 202 Squadron RAF	over flooded land (Überschwemm in (German) documents)
18	16 July 1918	1425 hours	Airco DH.4 or Airco DH.9	No. 218 Squadron RAF	Off Middelkerke, Belgium
19	29 July 1918	2035 hours	Sopwith Camel		Pervijse, Belgium
20	12 August 1918	1253 hours	Sopwith Camel	17th Aero Squadron, USAAS	Off Ostend, Belgium
21	12 August 1918	1255 hours	Airco DH.9	No. 206 Squadron RAF	Off Ostend, Belgium
22	16 August 1918		Sopwith Camel	No. 213 Squadron RAF	Off Zeebrugge, Belgium
23	16 August 1918		Airco DH.9	No. 211 Squadron RAF	Off Cadzand, Netherlands
24	21 August 1918		Airco DH.9		Off Zeebrugge, Belgium
25	2 September 1918		Enemy airplane		
26	23 October 1918		Airco DH.9	No. 108 Squadron RAF	
27 and 28	23 October 1918		Two Sopwith Camels	Both from No. 204 Squadron RAF	
29	26 October 1918	p.m.	Sopwith Camel	No. 65 Squadron RAF	Essengem
30	28 October 1918		Airco DH.9		
31	29 October 1918		Enemy airplane		
