= Yser Front =

Section of the Western Front in WW1

- Part of the Western front of World War I
Date	October 1914 – November 1918
Location	Belgium
Result	Belgian victory

Belligerents
Belgium; France; United Kingdom; United States (from 1917)	Germany

Commanders and leaders
(Belgium) Albert I	(German Empire) Rupprecht Wittelsbach

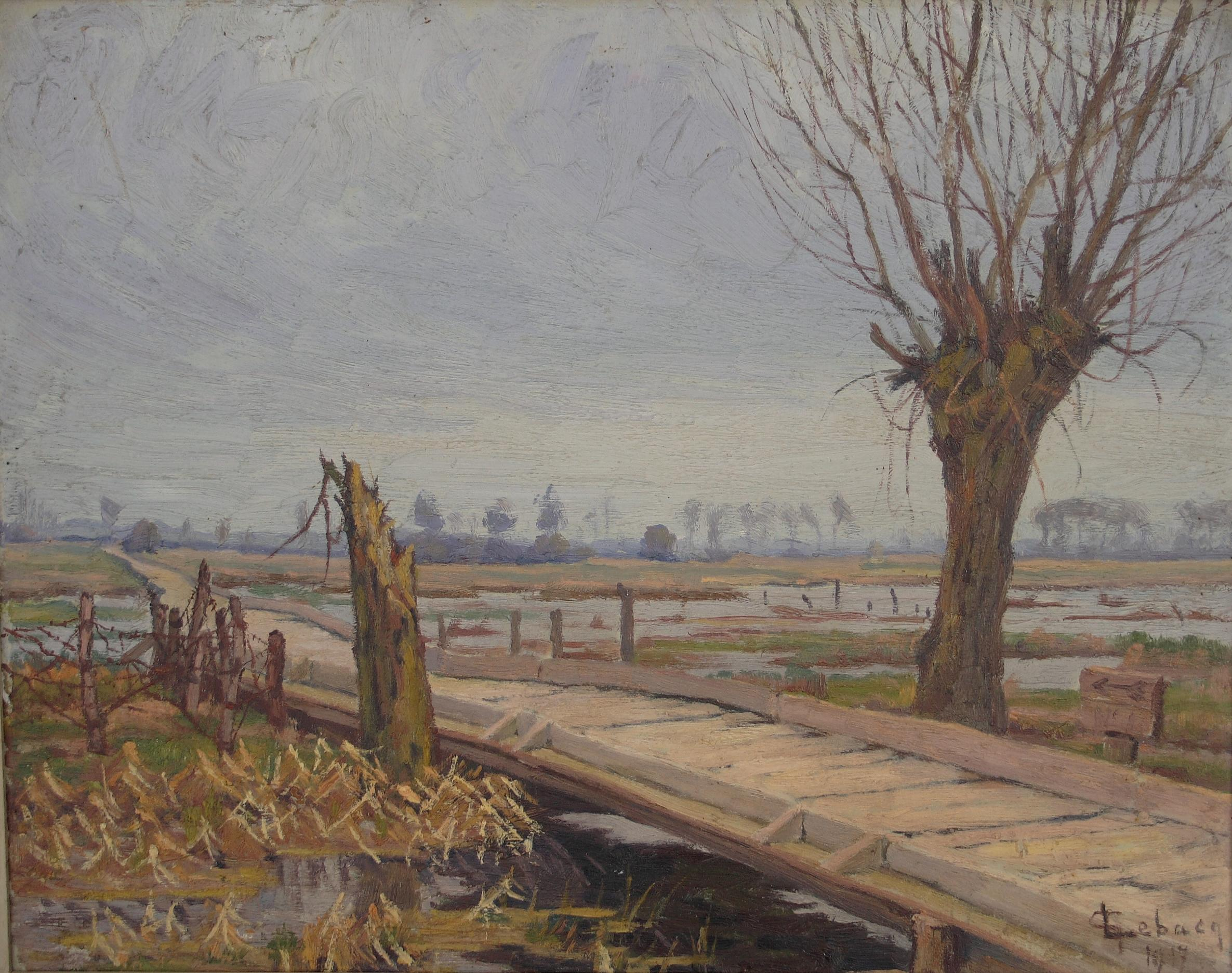
Depiction of the Yser Front by the Belgian artist Georges-Émile Lebacq (1917)

The Yser Front (French: Front de l'Yser, Dutch: Front aan de IJzer or IJzerfront), sometimes termed the West Flemish Front in British writing, was a section of the Western Front during World War I held by Belgian troops from October 1914 until 1918. The front ran along the Yser river (IJzer) and Yser Canal (Ieperlee) in the far north-west of Belgium and defended a small strip of the country which remained unoccupied. The front was established following the Battle of the Yser in October 1914, when the Belgian army succeeded in stopping the German advance after months of retreat and remained largely static for the duration of the war.

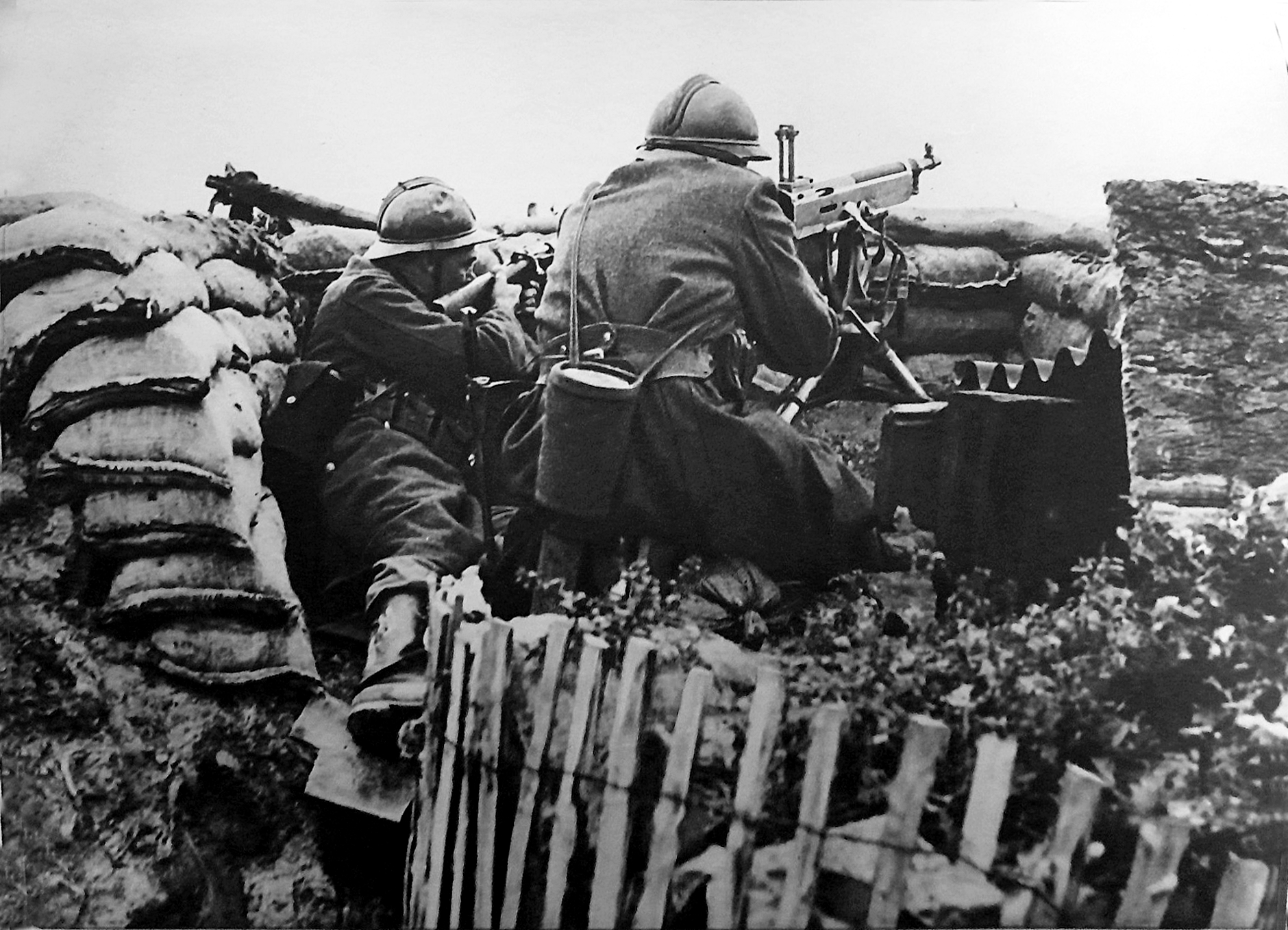
Machine gunner and rifleman in firing position in a Belgian trench on the Yser front.

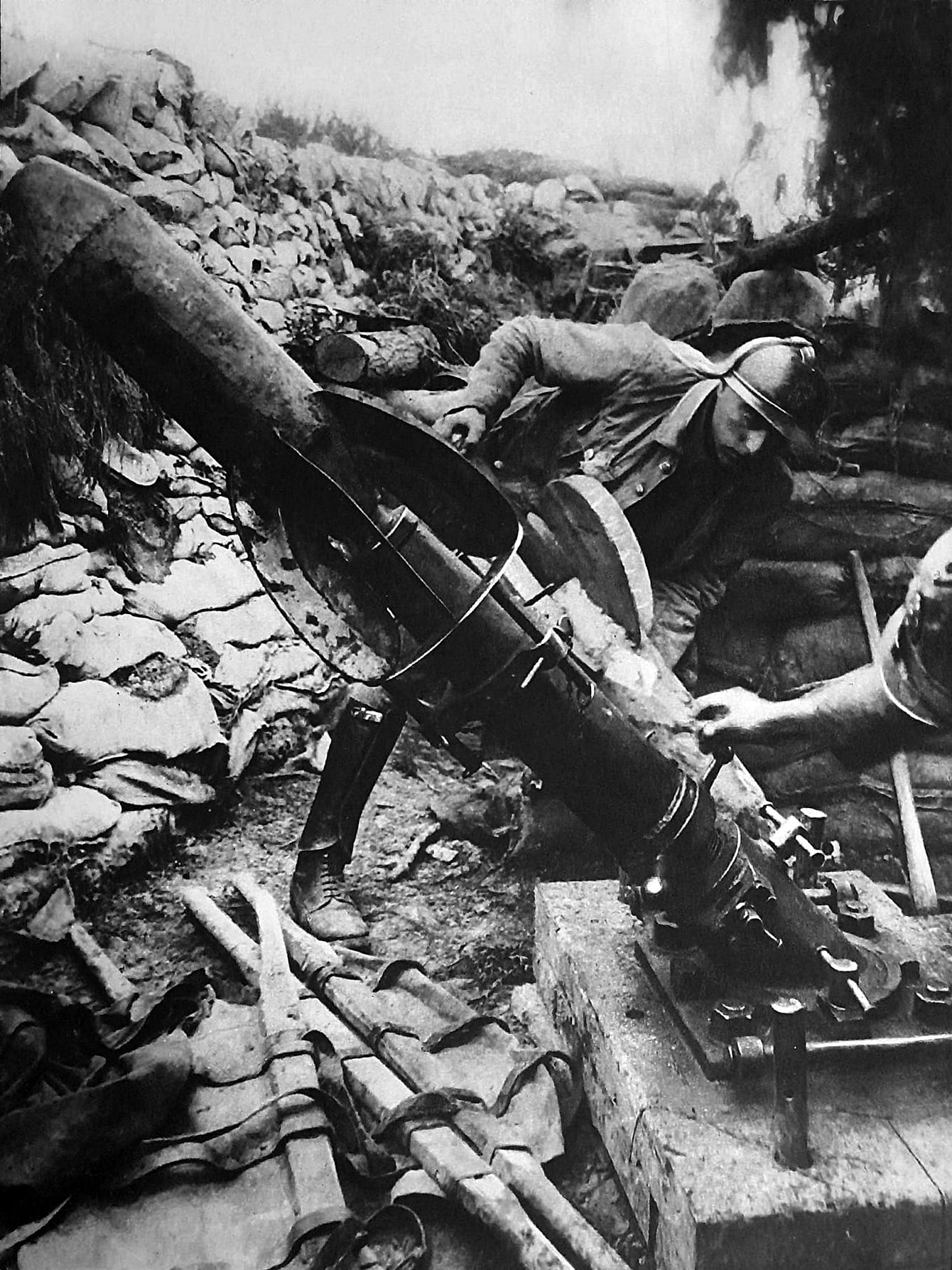
Bomb launcher in action at post N°4 in Diksmuide.

== Background ==
During the early campaigns of 1914, the Belgian army had been pushed out of the fortified cities of Liège, Namur and Antwerp by the German advance. Although they succeeded in delaying the Germans at some actions, they were forced to withdraw, first to Antwerp, and into the far north-west of Belgium. By October 1914, the Belgian forces were holding a position along the Yser and Ieperlee canal. After months of retreat, the Belgian forces were considerably reduced and were exhausted. They flooded a large expanse of territory in front of their lines, stretching as far south as Diksmuide. Between 16 and 31 October 1914, the Belgians held off the German army at the Battle of the Yser, suffering 3,500 killed and 15,000 wounded. The Battle of the Yser established a front line which would endure until 1918.

== Geography ==
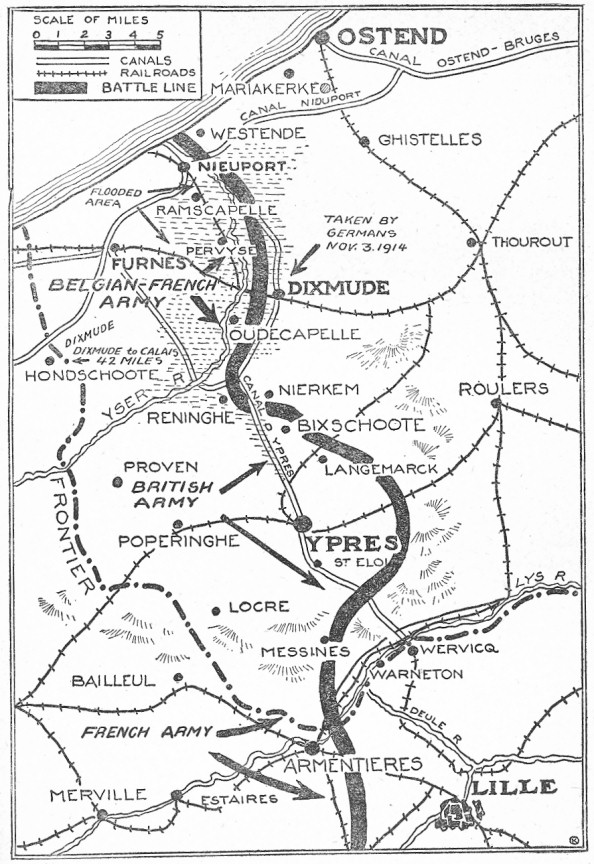
Battlefront in Flanders in 1914

The Yser Front stretched along a distance of around 30 kilometres (19 mi) from the Belgian North Sea coast between Nieuwpoort and Westende, stretching south-east along the Ieperlee, encompassing both Ramskapelle and Pervijze. From Pervijze, the line then arched south-east between the Yser and Ieperlee, down to Oudekapelle and Reninge. Diksmuide had fallen to German forces shortly before the Battle of the Yser.

The front protected a small region of north-west Belgium which remained unoccupied. King Albert I, commander-in-chief of the Belgian Army, established his headquarters in Veurne, one of the salient's only towns. The Belgian government, under Charles de Broqueville, established itself in exile in Sainte-Adresse, a suburb of the nearby French city of Le Havre.

== Aspects ==
=== Belgian policy and diplomacy ===
"I maintain that as long as I am here I will oppose everything which spills the blood of our soldiers uselessly on bloody and repetitive exercises that are doomed to failure. I do not hesitate to say that [...] I find this thinking dangerous, leading to a war of excess dangerous and risking the sacrifice of thousands of men without gain..."

— Albert I, in conversation with his minister (December 1916)

Despite protecting the northern sector of the Western Front, the Belgian army at the Yser refused to participate in Allied offensives for most of the war. King Albert I, in command of the Belgian armed forces, believed that Belgium's neutrality meant that its army should only be used to further Belgium's national interests. Albert was sceptical of the value of offensive warfare, advocated by the British and French, which he believed to be costly and unable to achieve decisive victory. Albert believed that a mediated peace was inevitable and that it served Belgium's national interest to continue to protect the territory it already held until the Germans could be forced to open negotiations. Consequently, the Yser Front remained generally static for much of the war. Only after the failure of the Ludendorff Offensive in 1918 did the Belgian Army participate in an Allied offensive, the Hundred Days Offensive, making successful advances into German-occupied Belgium.

On 28 September 1918, in the Fifth Battle of Ypres, the Groupe d'Armées des Flandres ("Flanders Army Group" or GAF), under the command of Albert I with the French General Jean Degoutte as Chief of Staff, composed of 12 Belgian divisions, 10 British divisions of the Second Army and 6 French divisions of the Sixth Army attacked the Germans and advanced up to 6 miles (9.7 km). After the following Battle of Courtrai, the GAF advanced some 40 miles (64 km) more.

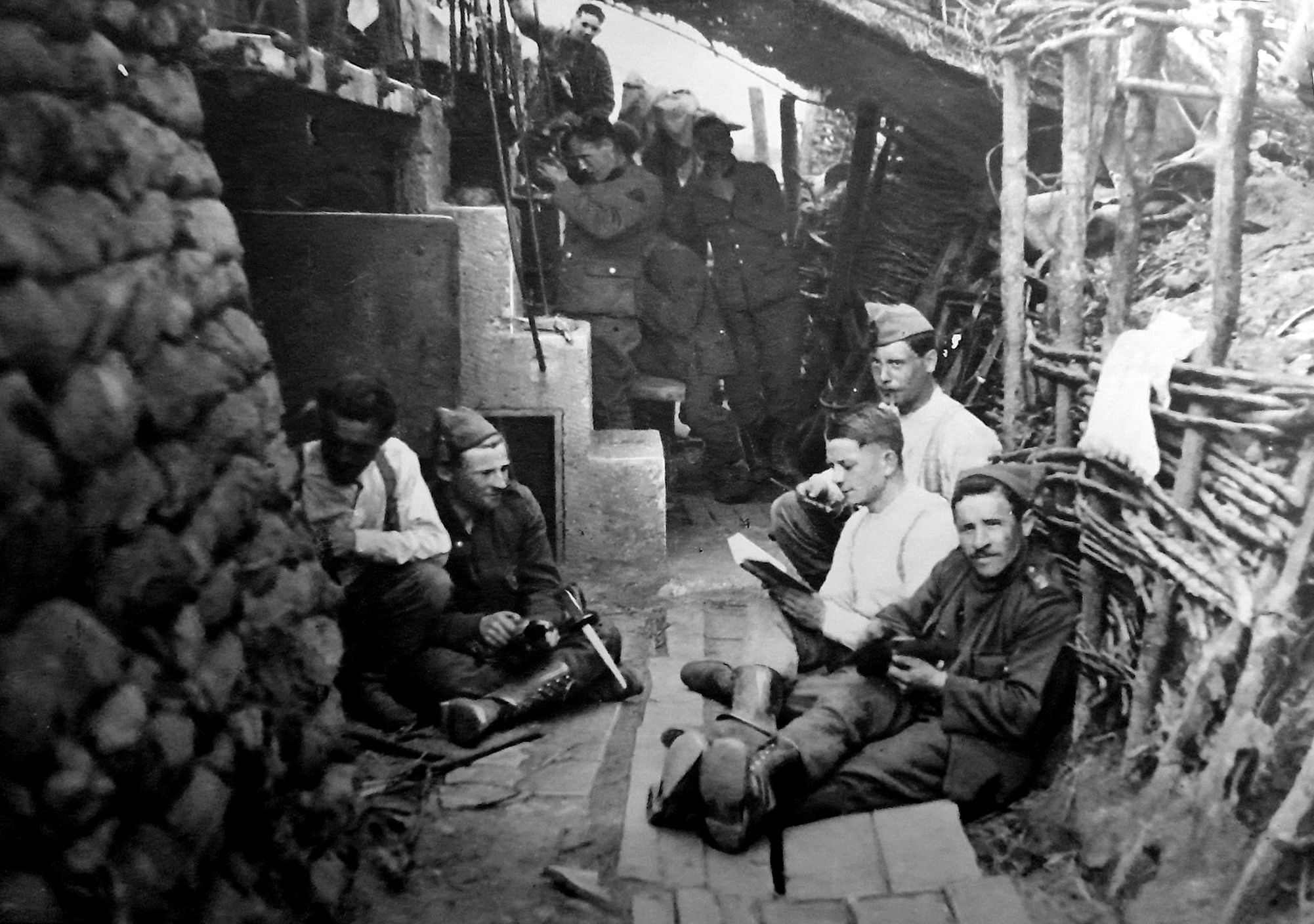
Life in a Belgian trench on the Yser front during the First World War.

=== Daily life ===
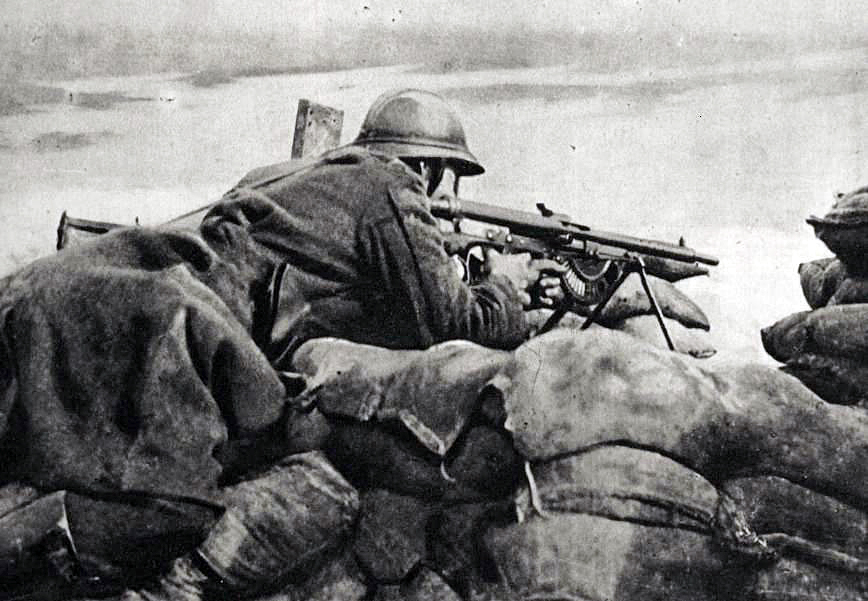
A Belgian soldier on the Yser Front in 1918

The front was held uniquely by Belgian forces, which numbered around 221,000 men by September 1918. Throughout the war, the Belgian Army was supplemented by escapees of military age (évadés) from German-occupied Belgium. Altogether, around 20,000 Belgian soldiers died on the Yser during the war. In 1914, the Christmas truce was observed in a number of parts of the line and a few Belgian and German troops met in no-man's land between the trenches.

Just like the rest of the Western Front, life on the front line was poor, with soldiers forced to live and sleep in unsanitary trenches, in mud ploughed up by artillery fire. Typhus was a major problem among Belgian troops on the Yser Front, where up to 7,000 soldiers died from diseases contracted there.

=== Politics and the Flemish Movement ===
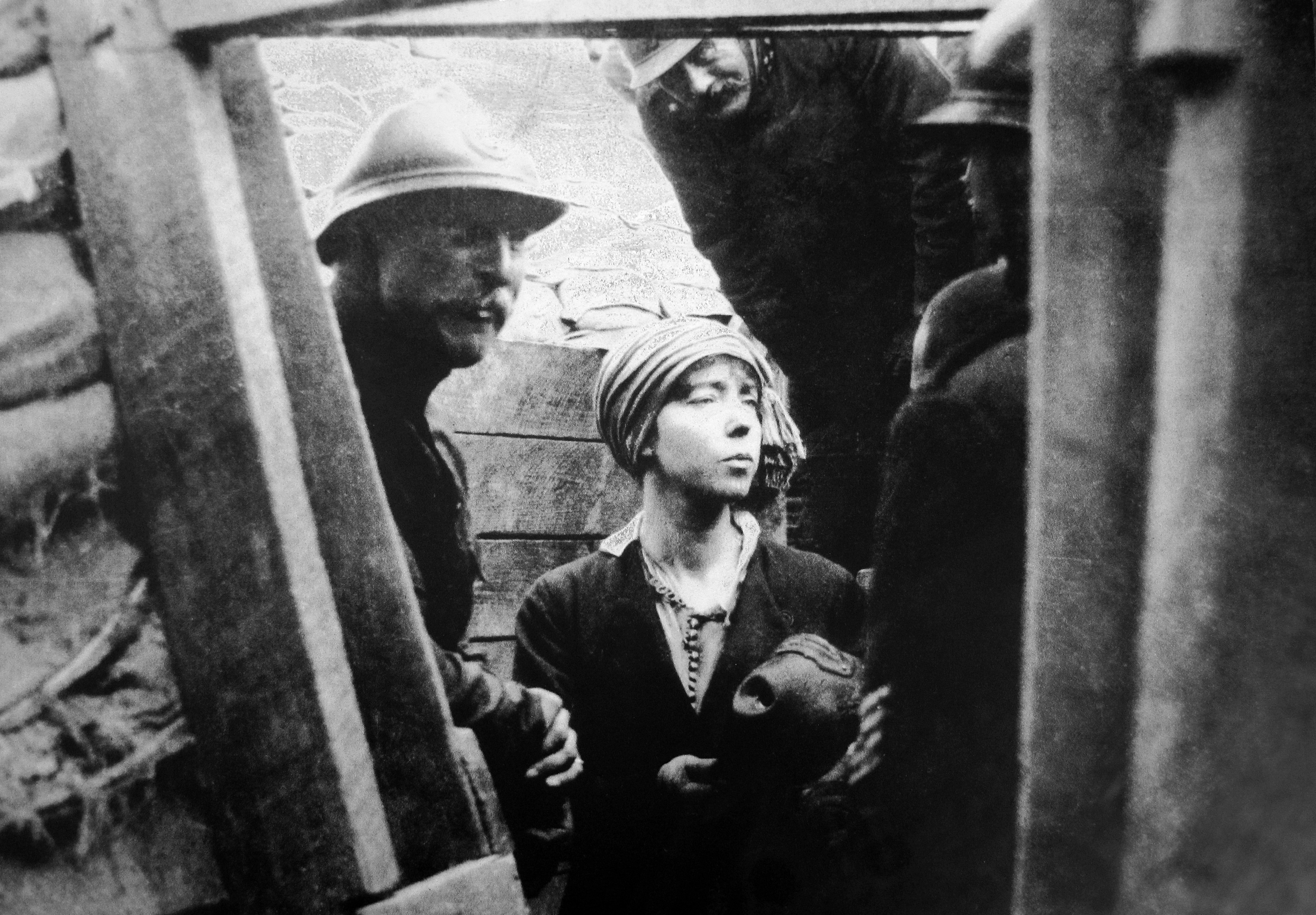
King Albert 1st and Queen Elisabeth visiting the trenches of the Yser Front during the First World War.

Within the Belgian army, the experience of the Yser Front had led to political upheaval. Of the Belgian soldiers on the Yser, between 65 and 80 percent were Flemish, speaking Dutch, while many of the Walloons spoke dialects such as Gaumais or Walloon. The language of command, however, was French and many Flemish soldiers felt resentful at their treatment by the French-speaking officer class. For the Flemish troops, the disquiet culminated in 1916 with the establishment of the Frontbeweging ("Front Movement") which gained a membership of 5,000 soldiers. Although part of the Flemish Movement, the Frontbeweging called for greater regional autonomy in Belgium, rather than Flemish independence, and the creation of Dutch-speaking regiments. Its most celebrated work was the Open Letter to the Belgian King Albert I, drafted by Adiel Debeuckelaere, in 1917 which aired many of the movement's grievances.

Although the Frontbeweging was unsuccessful in the short term, it succeeded in creating a dedicated political party, the Frontpartij, in post-war Belgium after the German defeat delegitimized many other parts of the Flemish Movement implicated in collaboration with the occupation authorities.

== See also ==
- Dodengang - section of preserved Belgian trenches near Diksmuide
- IJzertoren - a monument to the soldiers killed on the Yser Front
- Brothers Van Raemdonck
