= Oudekapelle =

- Deelgemeente
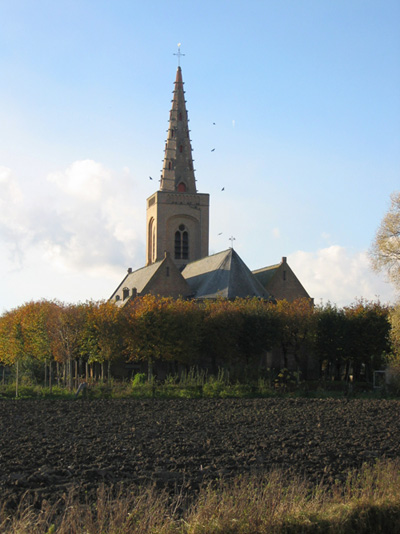
- Oudekapelle

- Coordinates: 51°00′46″N 02°48′33″E
- Country: Belgium
- Province: West Flanders
- Municipality: Diksmuide

Area
  - Total: 6.51 km^{2} (2.51 sq mi)

Population (2001)
  - Total: 152
  - Density: 23/km^{2} (60/sq mi)
- Source: NIS
- Postal code: 8600

Oudekapelle is a small village in the Belgian province of West Flanders and a part ("deelgemeente") of the municipality of Diksmuide. Oudekapelle is a small village with only about ten houses around the church and farms on its territory. It has about 150 inhabitants.

Oudekapelle was an independent municipality until 1971, when it became a part of a newly formed municipality of Driekapellen, together with Nieuwkapelle en Sint-Jacobskapelle. In 1977, Driekapellen itself became a part of Diksmuide.
