= Pervijze =

- Deelgemeente
- Coordinates: 51°04′24″N 02°47′42″E
- Country: Belgium
- Province: West Flanders
- Municipality: Diksmuide

Area
  - Total: 12.23 km^{2} (4.72 sq mi)

Population (2001)
  - Total: 883
  - Density: 72/km^{2} (190/sq mi)
- Source: NIS
- Postal code: 8600

Pervijze (French: Pervyse, English Pervyse) is a small rural village in the Belgian province of West Flanders, and a part ("Deelgemeente") of the municipality of Diksmuide. Pervijze has an area of 12.23 km^{2} and almost 900 inhabitants.

Before the municipal mergers in 1971, Pervijze was an independent municipality. In 1971, Lampernisse, Oostkerke and Stuivekenskerke were added to the municipality. In 1977 Pervijze became a part of Diksmuide.

During World War I, Pervijze was situated near the Yser Front and was destroyed. Two British nurses, Elsie Knocker and Mairi Chisholm, became known as "The Madonnas of Pervyse" in the British press. In Brussels (more precisely in Etterbeek), there is a street called "Rue de Pervyse" and "Pervijzestraat".

== Gallery ==
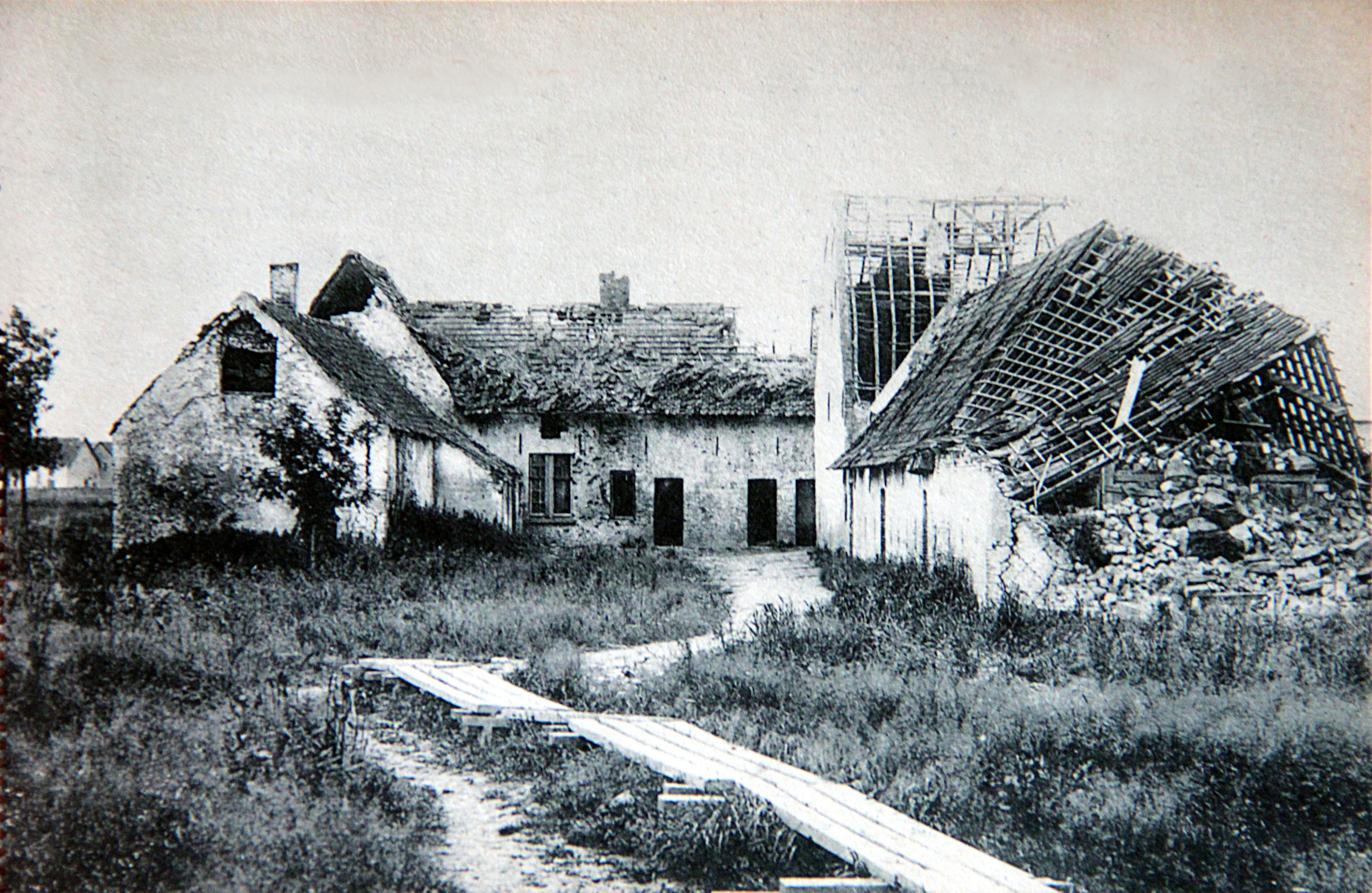
Farm destroyed during the battle that took place in June 1916 south of Pervyse.

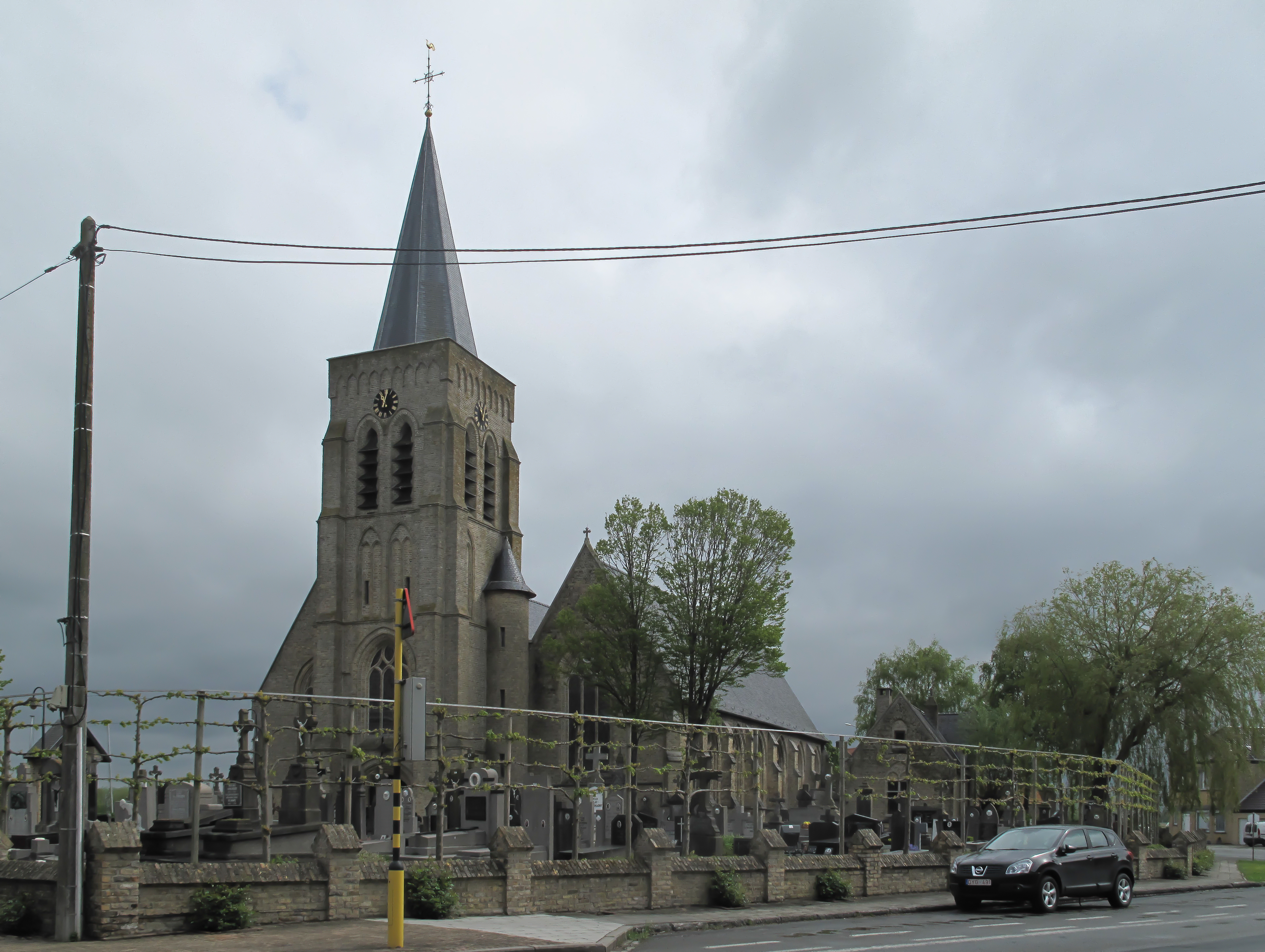
Parish church of Sint-Niklaas en Sint-Katharina
