= Leke =

- Deelgemeente
- Coordinates: 51°06′03″N 02°53′30″E
- Country: Belgium
- Province: West Flanders
- Municipality: Diksmuide

Area
  - Total: 10.73 km^{2} (4.14 sq mi)

Population (2001)
  - Total: 1,078
  - Density: 100/km^{2} (260/sq mi)
- Source: NIS
- Postal code: 8600

Leke is a town in Diksmuide, a part of Belgium in the province of West Flanders.

== Gallery ==
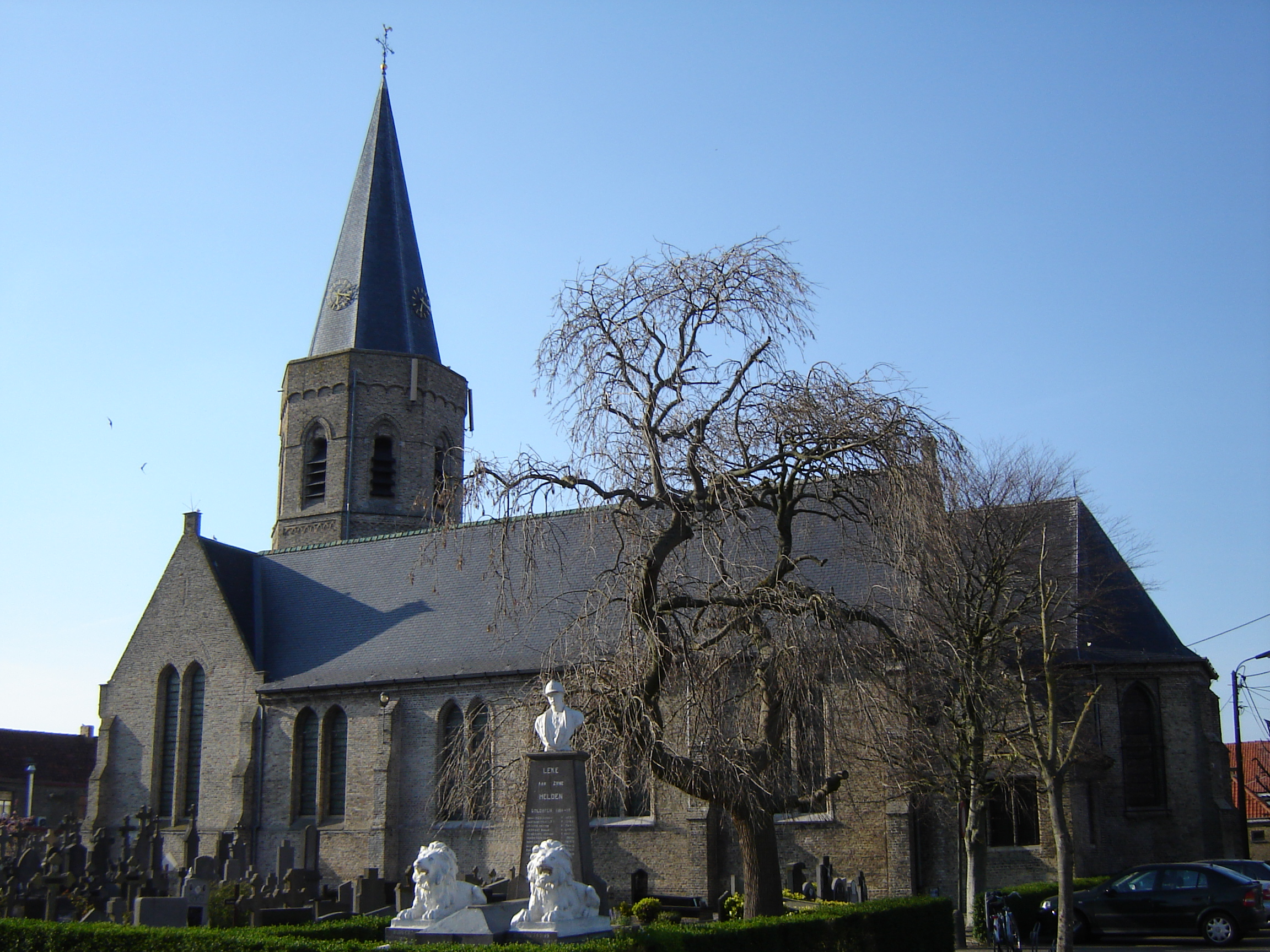
Church of Saint Nicholas

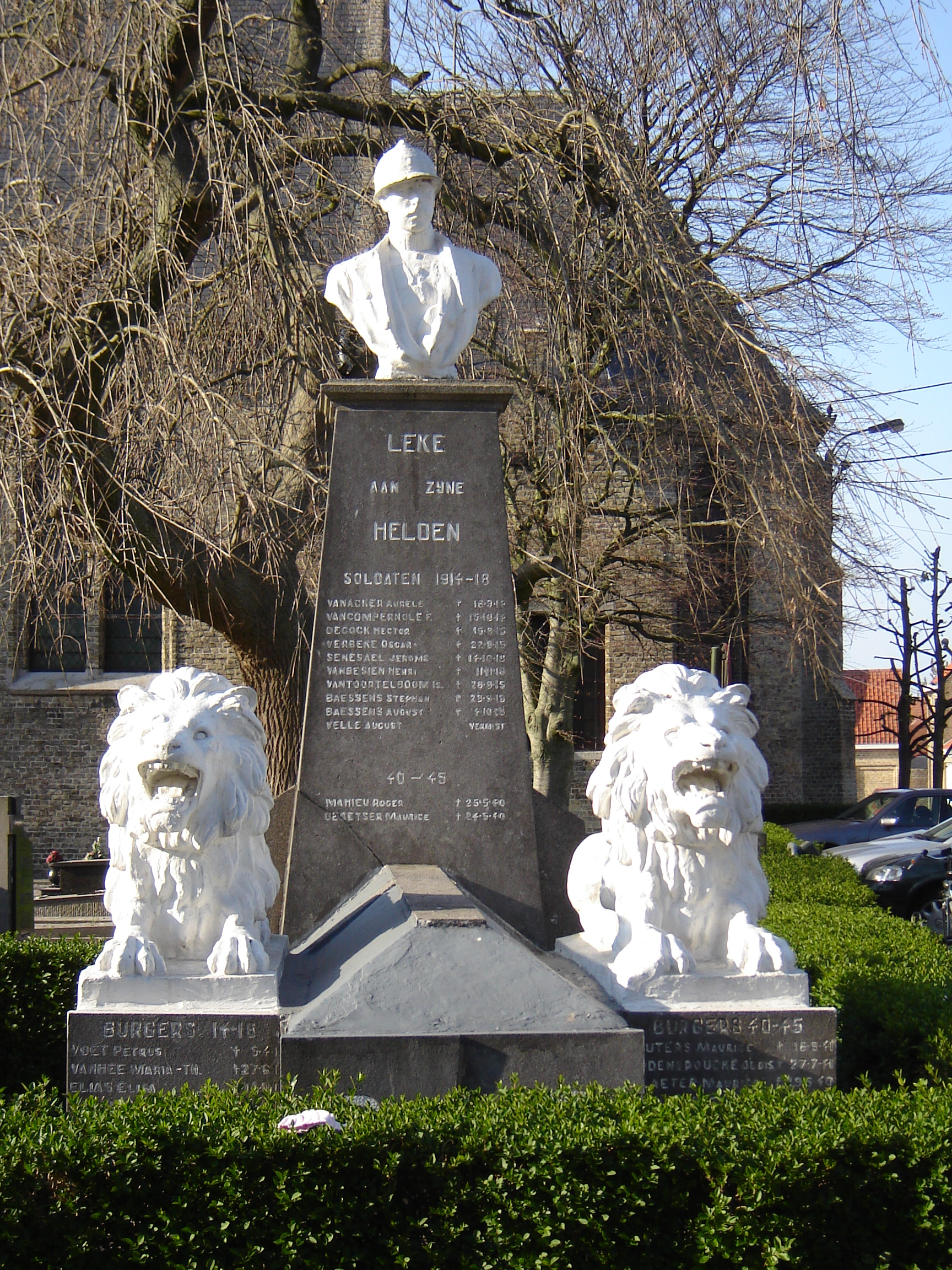
War monument

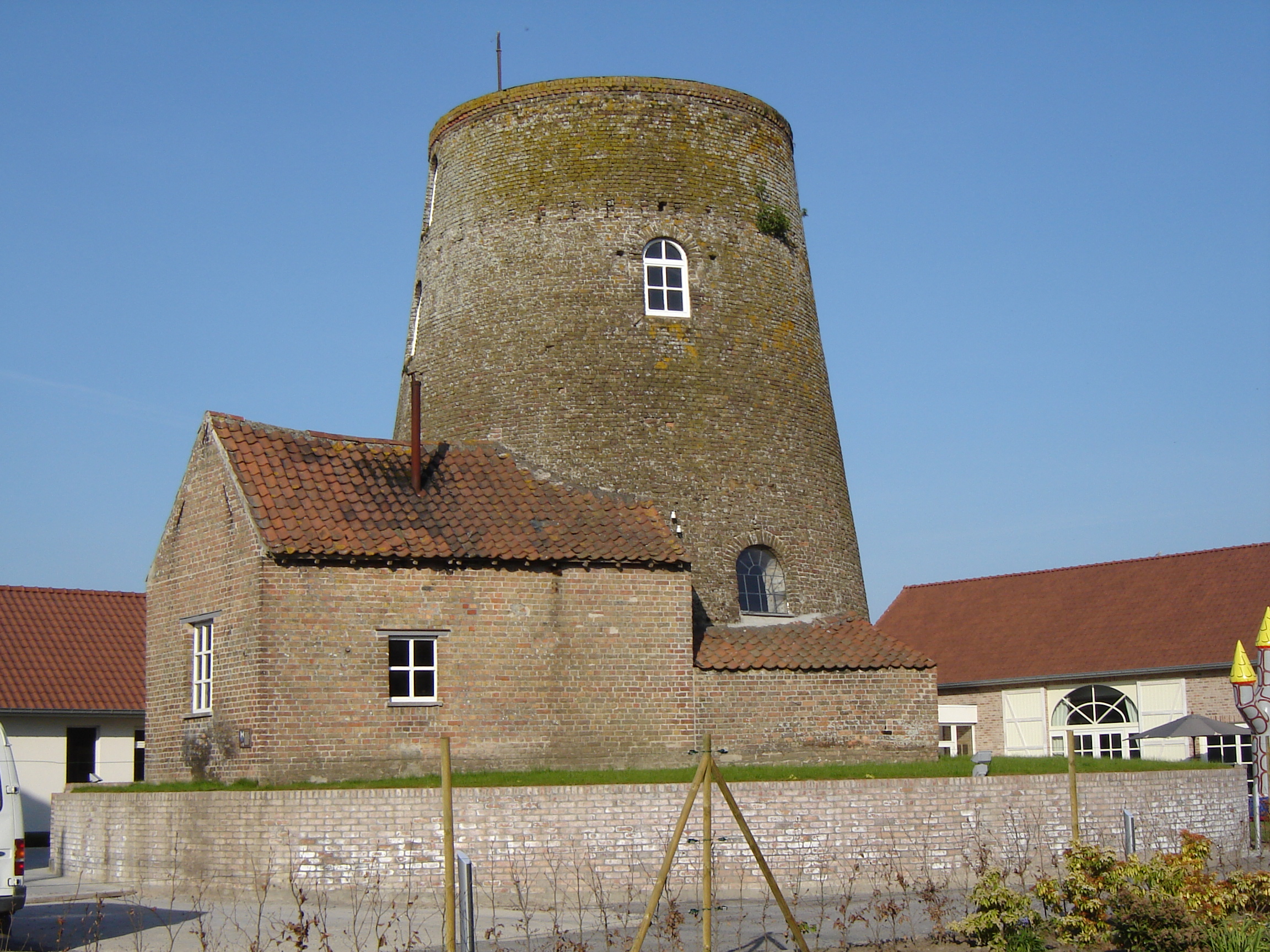
Kruiskalsijdemolen mill
