= Vladslo =

- Deelgemeente
- Coordinates: 51°02′45″N 02°55′00″E
- Country: Belgium
- Province: West Flanders
- Municipality: Diksmuide

Area
  - Total: 17.33 km^{2} (6.69 sq mi)

Population (2007)
  - Total: 1,239
  - Density: 71/km^{2} (180/sq mi)
- Source: NIS
- Postal code: 8600

Vladslo is a village in the Belgian province of West Flanders and a part ("deelgemeente") of the municipality of Diksmuide. The rural village has slightly over 1,200 inhabitants.

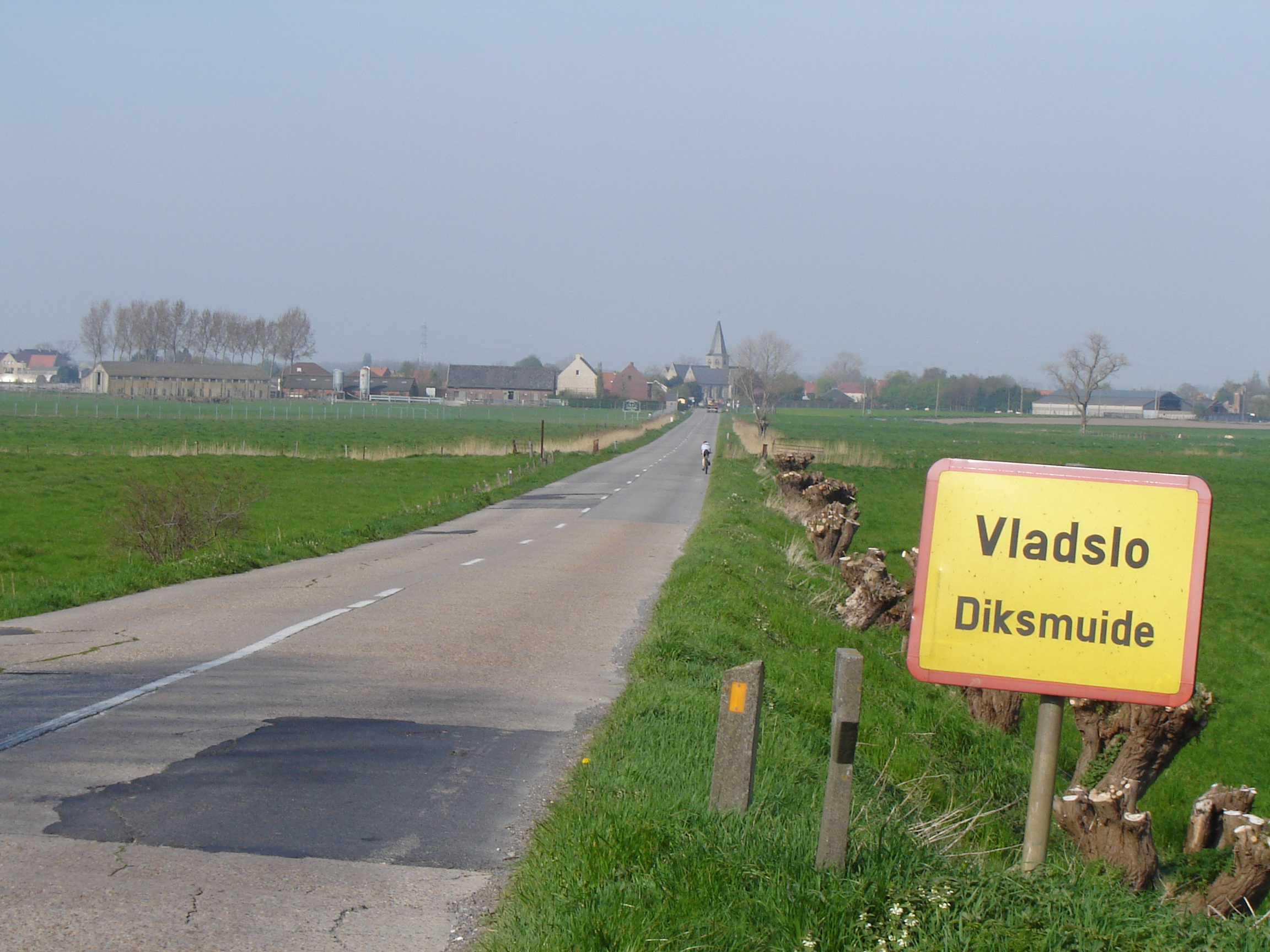
View on Vladslo

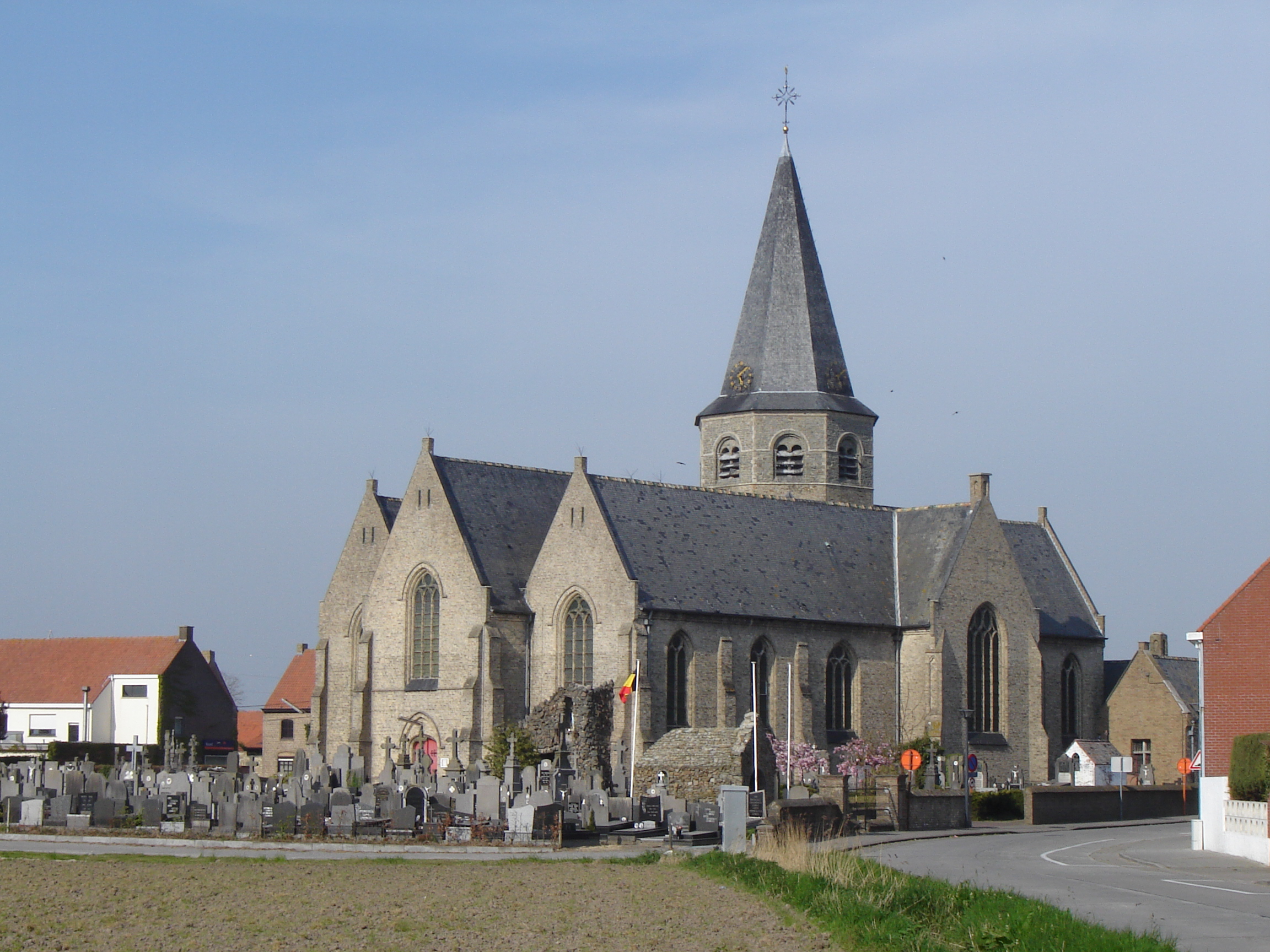
Church of Saint Martin

== Attractions ==
- The church of St Martin has a Romanesque tower dating from the 15th century. The church was rebuilt after it had been damaged in World War I.
- The Vladslo German war cemetery in the Praatbos woods has more than 25,000 burials from World War I. On the cemetery are the stone statues of The Grieving Parents of Berlin artist Käthe Kollwitz, made for her 17-year-old son Peter who died in nearby Esen on October 23, 1914. The song "Vladslo" of Flemish singer Willem Vermandere is about this cemetery.

== Demographic evolution ==
Historical population

Year	Pop.	±%
1806	1,059	—
1816	1,703	+60.8%
1830	2,024	+18.8%
1846	2,362	+16.7%
1856	2,238	−5.2%
1866	2,200	−1.7%
1876	2,248	+2.2%

Year	Pop.	±%
1880	2,175	−3.2%
1890	2,216	+1.9%
1900	2,026	−8.6%
1910	2,031	+0.2%
1920	1,647	−18.9%
1930	1,795	+9.0%
1947	1,854	+3.3%

Year	Pop.	±%
1961	1,671	−9.9%
1970	1,580	−5.4%
1981	1,384	−12.4%
1991	1,322	−4.5%
2001	1,259	−4.8%
2007	1,239	−1.6%

Note: 1806 to 1970=census on December 31
