= Kaaskerke =

Coordinates: 51°02′N 2°50′E

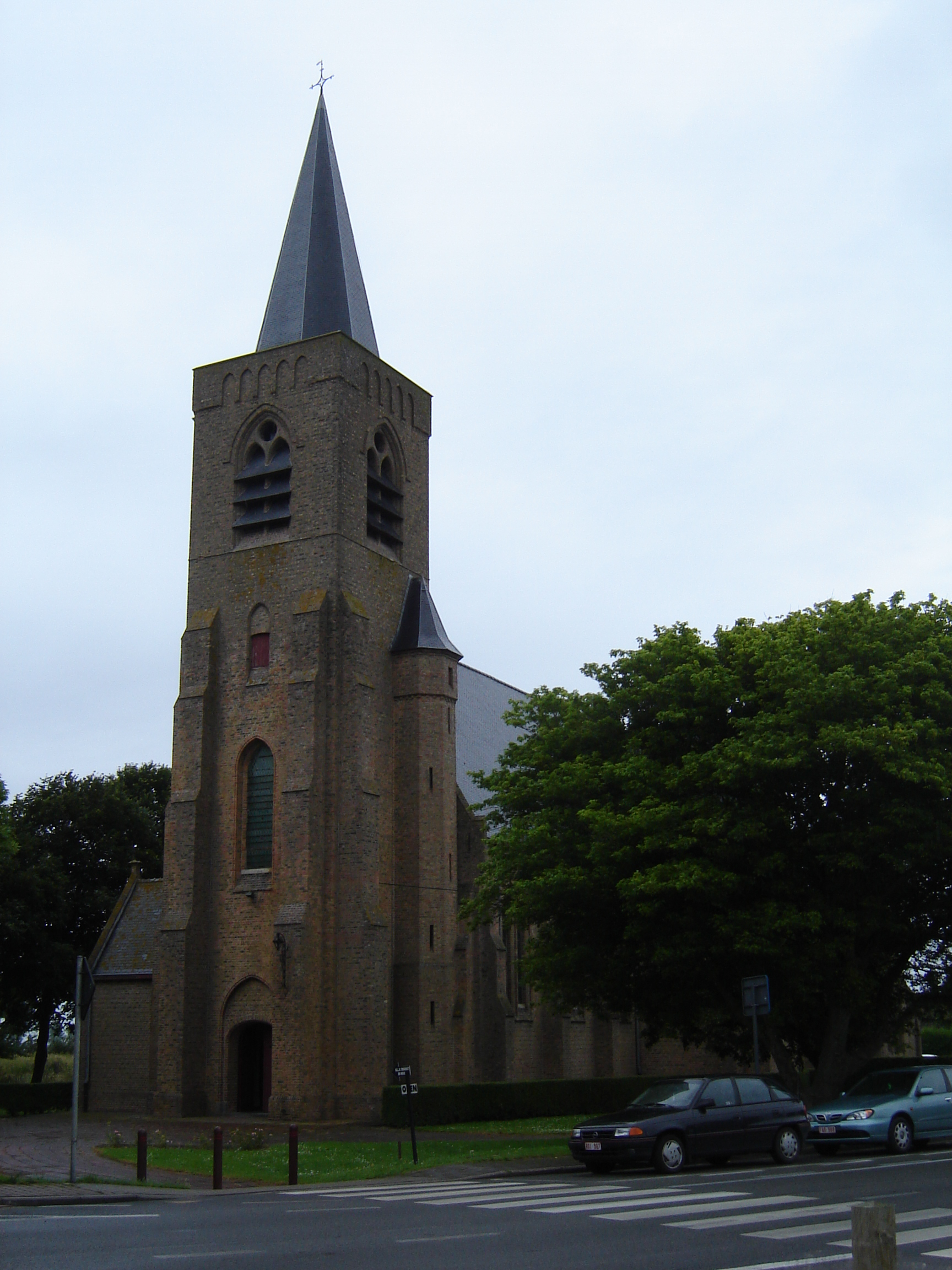
Image of a church in the town

Kaaskerke is a town in Diksmuide, a part of Belgium.

== See also ==
- West Flanders
