= Yser Testament =

Open letter during World War I

The Yser Testament (Dutch: IJzertestament), officially entitled Open Letter to the King of the Belgians Albert I (Dutch: Open brief aan den Koning der Belgen Albert I) (Note: According to the Constitution, the title of the Belgian monarch is "King of the Belgians" (Koning der Belgen) rather than "King of Belgium" (Koning van België) to reflect the monarchy's popular character.), was an 11-page open letter addressed to King Albert I and published on 11 July 1917 (Note: The letter's date, 11 July, was the anniversary of the Battle of the Golden Spurs of 1302, a key historical reference for Flemish identity. Today the same date is celebrated annually as the Day of the Flemish Community.) during World War I. The letter's author, the philologist Adiel Debeuckelaere, set out a number of grievances relating to the treatment of the Flemish within the Belgian Army fighting on the Yser Front during World War I, especially concerning the perceived inequality of French and Dutch languages. It demanded that new legislation to equalise the status of the two languages be introduced after the war. The letter was the most famous action of the Frontbeweging and is considered an important moment in the history of the Flemish Movement.

The letter expressed loyalty to Albert I and demanded autonomy, rather than independence, for Flanders within a Belgian framework. It nonetheless provoked an angry reaction from the High Command which viewed the letter as subversive. Within German-occupied Belgium, a large faction of the Flemish Movement were collaborating with the German authorities as part of the Flamenpolitik and the letter defended their actions. In the aftermath of the letter's publication, Flemish Movement ideas spread among ordinary Flemish soldiers for the first time, leading to growing unrest. Armand De Ceuninck was appointed to Minister of War in August to restore discipline.
