= Beerst =

- Deelgemeente
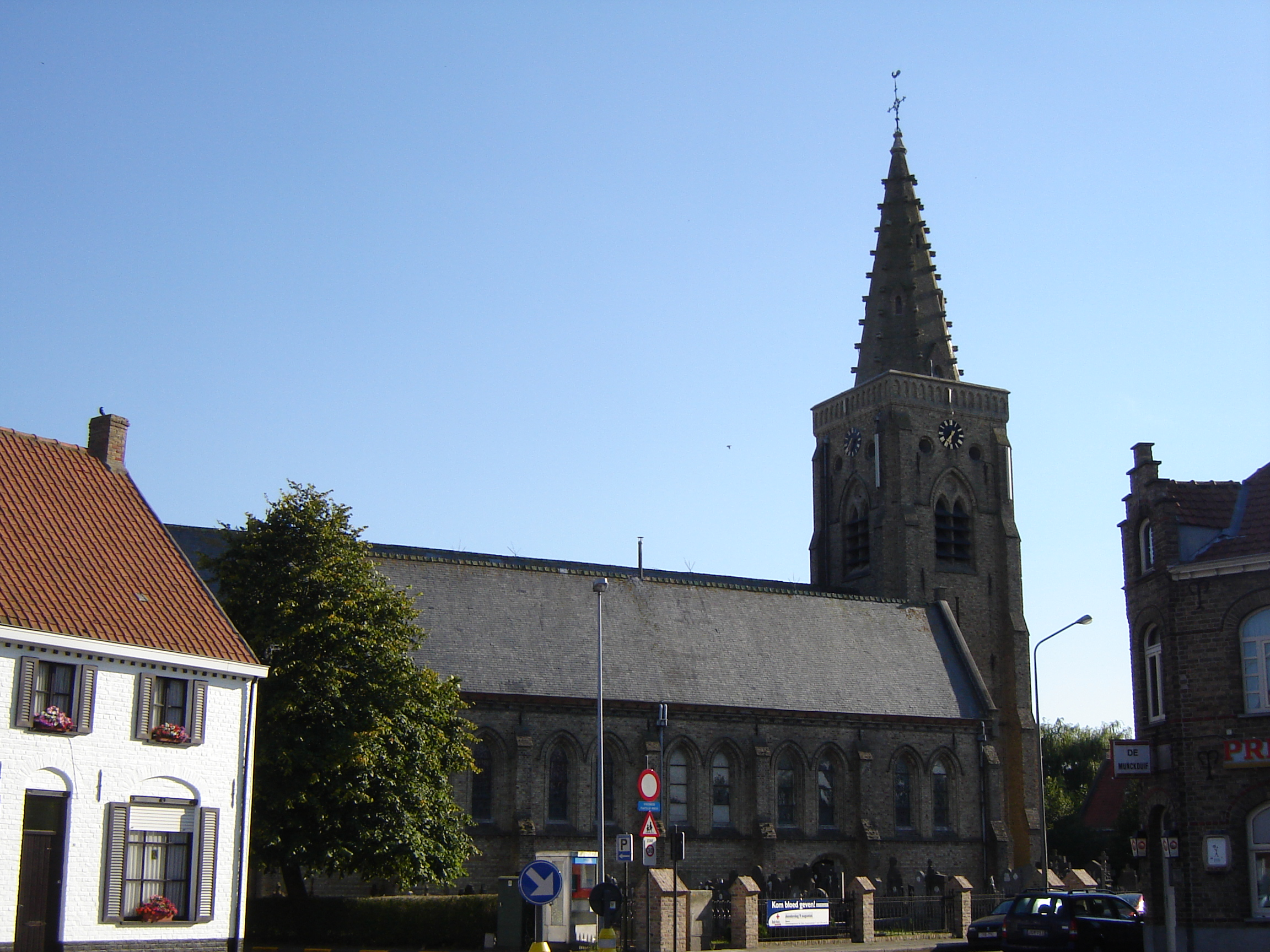
- Church in Beerst

- Coordinates: 51°03′27″N 02°53′07″E
- Country: Belgium
- Province: West Flanders
- Municipality: Diksmuide

Area
  - Total: 11.66 km^{2} (4.50 sq mi)

Population (2001)
  - Total: 1,036
  - Density: 89/km^{2} (230/sq mi)
- Source: NIS
- Postal code: 8600

Beerst is a town in Diksmuide, a part of Belgium.

== See also ==
- West Flanders
