= Sint-Jacobskapelle =

Town in Diksmuide, Belgium

Coordinates: 51°00′N 02°50′E

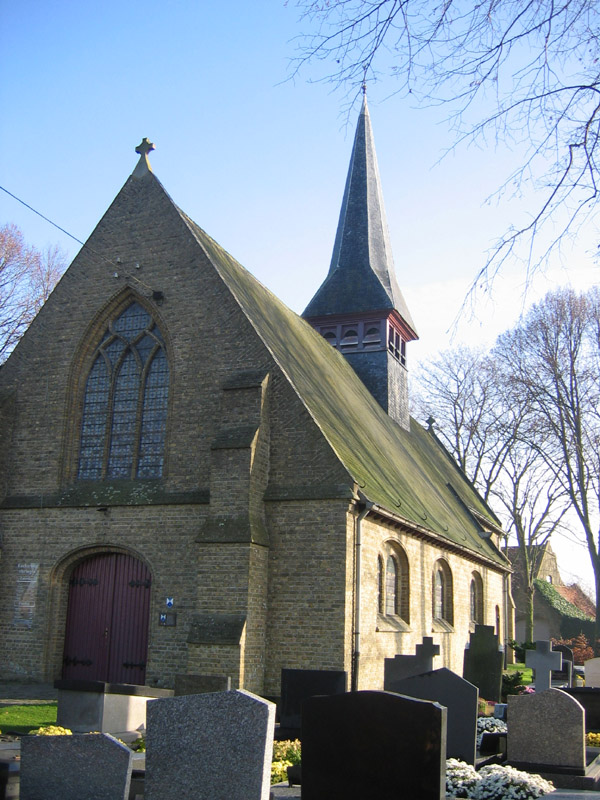
Sint-Jacobskapelle in Diksmuide, Belgium

Sint-Jacobskapelle is a town in Diksmuide, a part of Belgium.

== See also ==
- West Flanders
