= Keiem =

- Deelgemeente
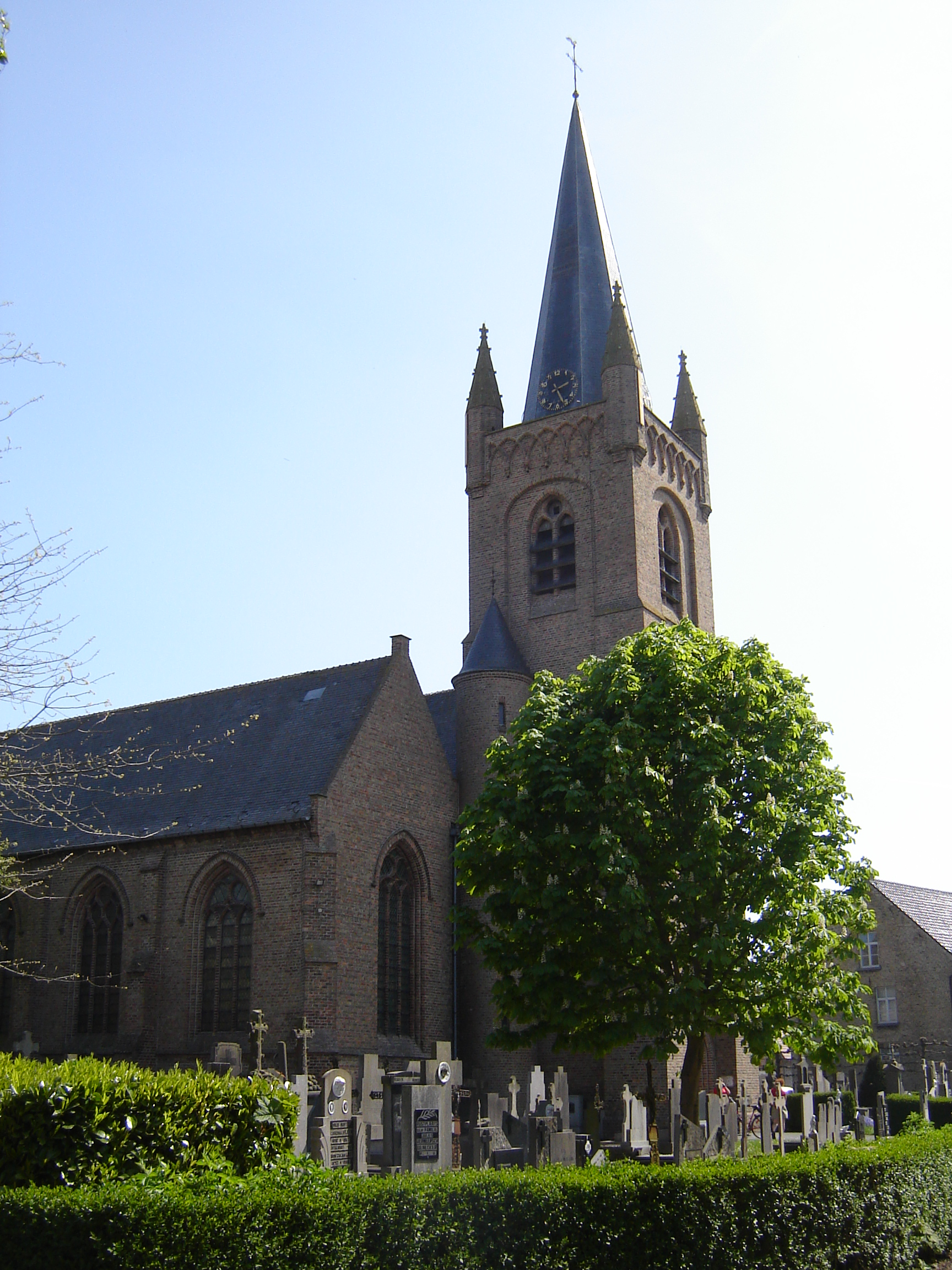
- Church of Saint Nicholas

- Coordinates: 51°04′55″N 02°53′03″E
- Country: Belgium
- Province: West Flanders
- Municipality: Diksmuide

Area
  - Total: 12.92 km^{2} (4.99 sq mi)

Population (2007)
  - Total: 1,298
  - Density: 100/km^{2} (260/sq mi)
- Source: NIS
- Postal code: 8600

Keiem is a small town situated some 7 km north of Diksmuide in West Flanders, Belgium. Administratively it forms part of Diksmuide Municipality.

Lying close to the right bank of the River Yser, the town suffered extensive flooding when, on 21 October 1914, the sea locks at the mouth of this river were opened as a defensive measure against the advancing German Army during the "Race to the Sea" phase of World War I. The operation was successful in halting the advance, with the result, however, that Keiem was to occupy the front line of the war for the next four years. By the end of the conflict, apart from three damaged houses which still stood, the town had been completely flattened.
