= Oostkerke =

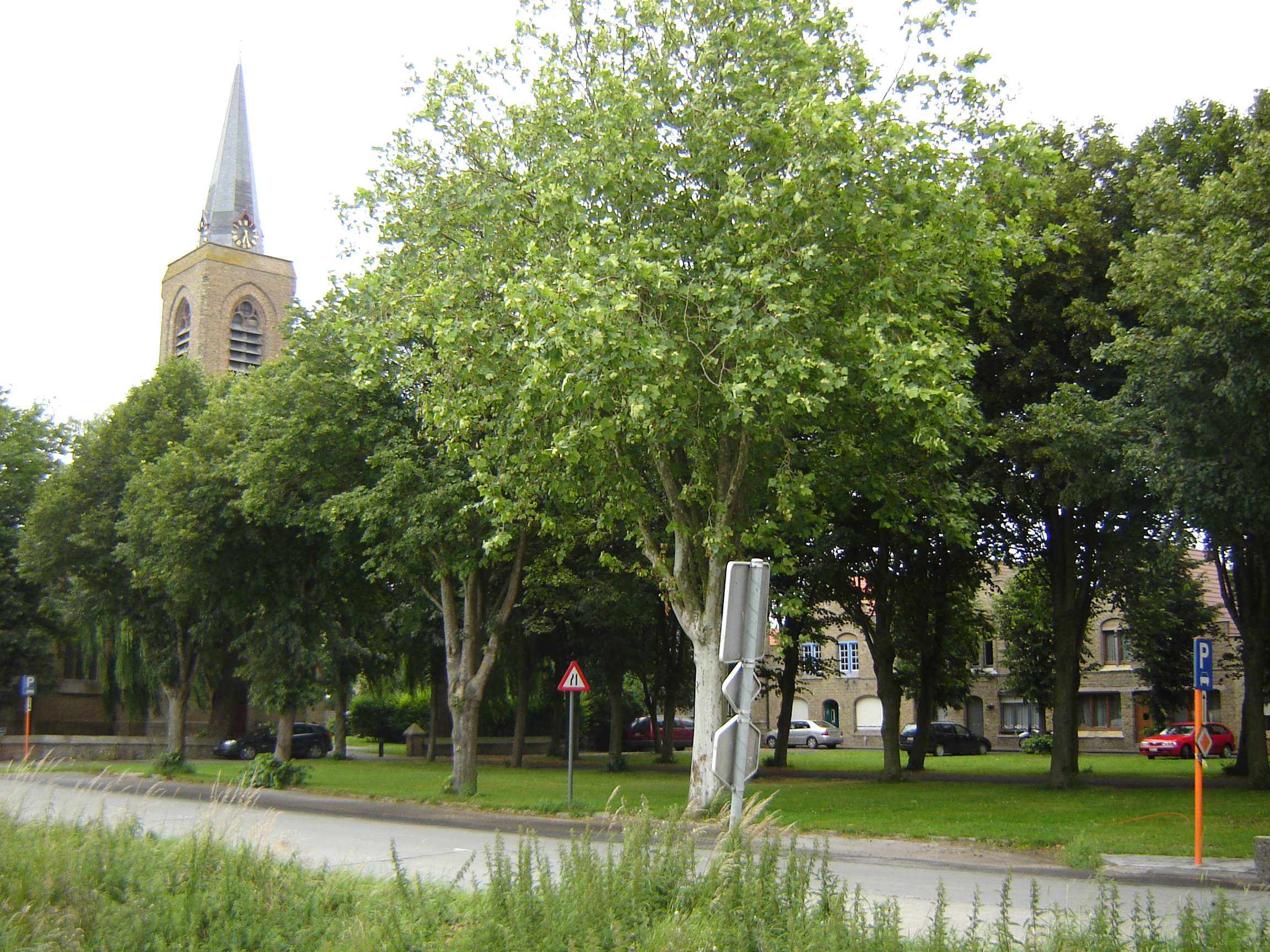

- Location within Belgium
- Coordinates: 51.0466°N 2.797°E

Oostkerke (Dutch, 'East church') is a town in Diksmuide, West Flanders, Belgium.
