= Lampernisse =

Section of Diksmuide, Belgium

Coordinates: 51°02′N 02°45′E

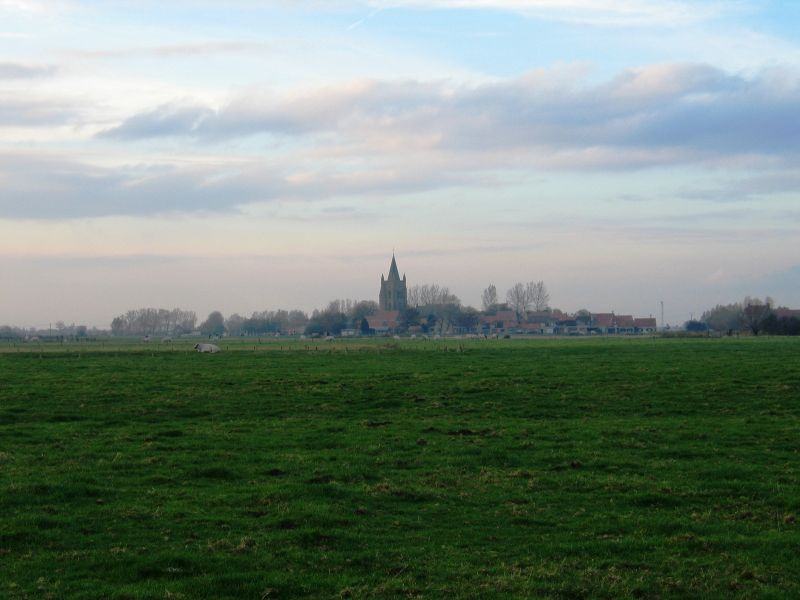
Lampernisse

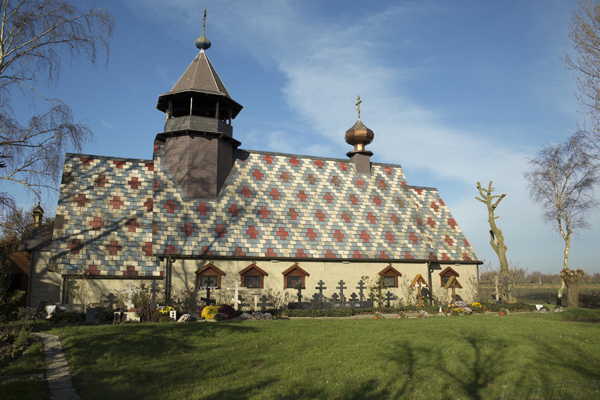
Russian orthodox church

Lampernisse is a village and sub-municipality of Diksmuide, in the province of West Flanders, Belgium. Located in the Flemish Region, it is an agricultural and residential village in the polder area northwest of Diksmuide. The settlement was first mentioned in 857 as "Lampannesse"; the former municipality was merged into Pervijze in 1971 and then into Diksmuide in 1977.

== Notable Landmark ==
One of the village’s most notable sites is the Russian Orthodox Church of the Holy Apostles Peter and Paul, established in the 20th century. The church serves as a spiritual and cultural hub for the small Orthodox Christian community in the region.
