= Diksmuide =

Diksmuide Diksmude (West Flemish): Dixmude (French)
- City and municipality
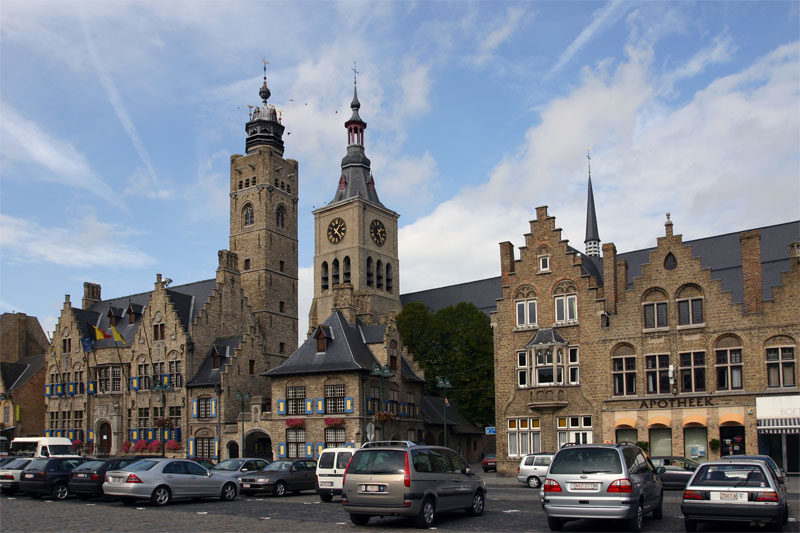
- Town Hall and St Nicholas Church

- Flag Coat of arms

- Location of Diksmuide in West Flanders
- Interactive map of Diksmuide
- Location in Belgium
- Coordinates: 51°02′00″N 02°51′54″E
- Country: Belgium
- Community: Flemish Community
- Region: Flemish Region
- Province: West Flanders
- Arrondissement: Diksmuide

Government
  - Mayor: Lies Laridon (CD&V)
  - Governing parties: CD&V, Idee

Area
  - Total: 150.74 km^{2} (58.20 sq mi)

Population (2018-01-01)
  - Total: 16,739
  - Density: 111.05/km^{2} (287.61/sq mi)
- Postal codes: 8600
- NIS code: 32003
- Area codes: 051
- Website: www.diksmuide.be

Diksmuide (Dutch: [dɪksˈmœydə]; French: Dixmude [diksmyd]; West Flemish: Diksmude) is a Belgian city and municipality in the Flemish province of West Flanders. The municipality comprises the city of Diksmuide proper and the former communes of Beerst, Esen, Kaaskerke, Keiem, Lampernisse, Leke, Nieuwkapelle, Oostkerke, Oudekapelle, Pervijze, Sint-Jacobs-Kapelle, Stuivekenskerke, Vladslo and Woumen.

Most of the area west of the city is a polder riddled with drainage trenches. The major economic activity of the region is dairy farming, producing the famous butter of Diksmuide.

== History ==
=== Medieval origins ===
The 9th-century Frankish settlement of Dicasmutha was situated at the mouth of a stream near the River Yser (Dutch: IJzer). The name is a compound of the Dutch words dijk (dike) and muide (river mouth). By the 10th century, a chapel and marketplace were already established. The city's charter was granted two centuries later and defensive walls built in 1270. The economy was already then based mainly on agriculture, with dairy products and linen driving the economy.

From the 15th century to the French Revolution, Diksmuide was affected by the wars between the Netherlands, France, Spain, and Austria, with a corresponding decline in activity; it was captured by French forces in the Capitulation of Diksmuide in 1695. The 19th century was more peaceful and prosperous.

=== World War I ===
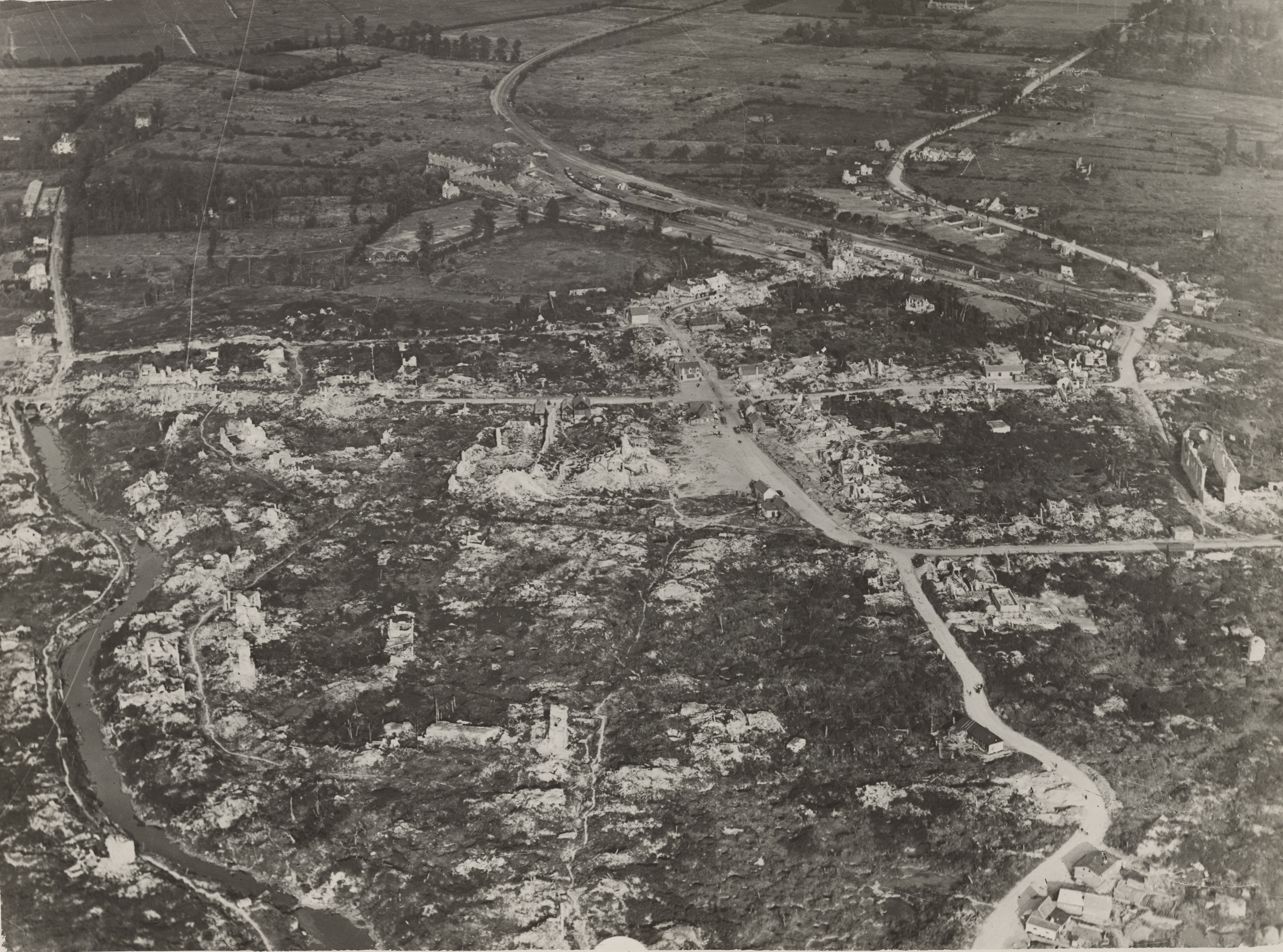
Ruins of Diksmuide, 1919

At the outset of World War I, German troops crossed the Belgian border near Arlon, then proceeded hurriedly towards the North Sea to secure the French ports of Calais and Dunkirk. The Battle of the Yser started in October 1914. Thanks to the water the Belgians were able to stop the Germans; at the end of October, they opened the floodgates holding back the River Yser and flooded the area. As a result, the river became a front line throughout the First World War. The city was first attacked on 16 October 1914 and defended by Belgian and French troops, which marked the beginning of the battle. Colonel Alphonse Jacques led the troops that prevented Diksmuide from being taken by the German Army. Despite the heavy Belgian losses, the press, politicians, literary figures and the military itself created propaganda which formed public opinion into making the action appear strategic and heroic.

By the time the fighting ended, the town had been reduced to rubble. It was, however, completely rebuilt in the 1920s.

== Sights ==
- The belfry contains a 30-bell carillon and is a UNESCO World Heritage Site, on the list Belfries of Belgium and France.
- The City Hall and neighbouring Saint Nicolas Church were completely rebuilt after World War I in the Gothic style of the 14th and 15th centuries.
- The "Trench of Death" (Dutch: Dodengang), about 1.5 km (0.93 mi) from the centre of the city, preserves the trench setting where Belgian soldiers fought under the most perilous conditions until the final offensive of 28 September 1918.
- The Yser Tower peace monument was built during the 1920s but demolished in 1946 as it had been the scene of Nazi ceremonies and collaboration during World War II. A new tower was built in the 1950s which houses a World War I museum owned by the United Nations, where it is possible to experience mustard gas odour gas. The Yser Tower is also the scene of the yearly IJzerbedevaart (Dutch for 'Pilgrimage of the Yser'), a celebration of peace and of Flemish political autonomy. However, the tower had become associated with neo-Nazis from all over Europe but eventually the organisers succeeded in banning neo-Nazis. The more radical Flemish faction now organizes the IJzerwake (Dutch for 'Yser Vigil').
- Several military cemeteries are located around Diksmuide, including the Vladslo German war cemetery, which is now the resting place for more than 25,000 German soldiers and has the famous sculpture of the 'Mourning parents' by Käthe Kollwitz.
- Diksmuide used to have its own weekly magazine called Weekblad van Dixmude.
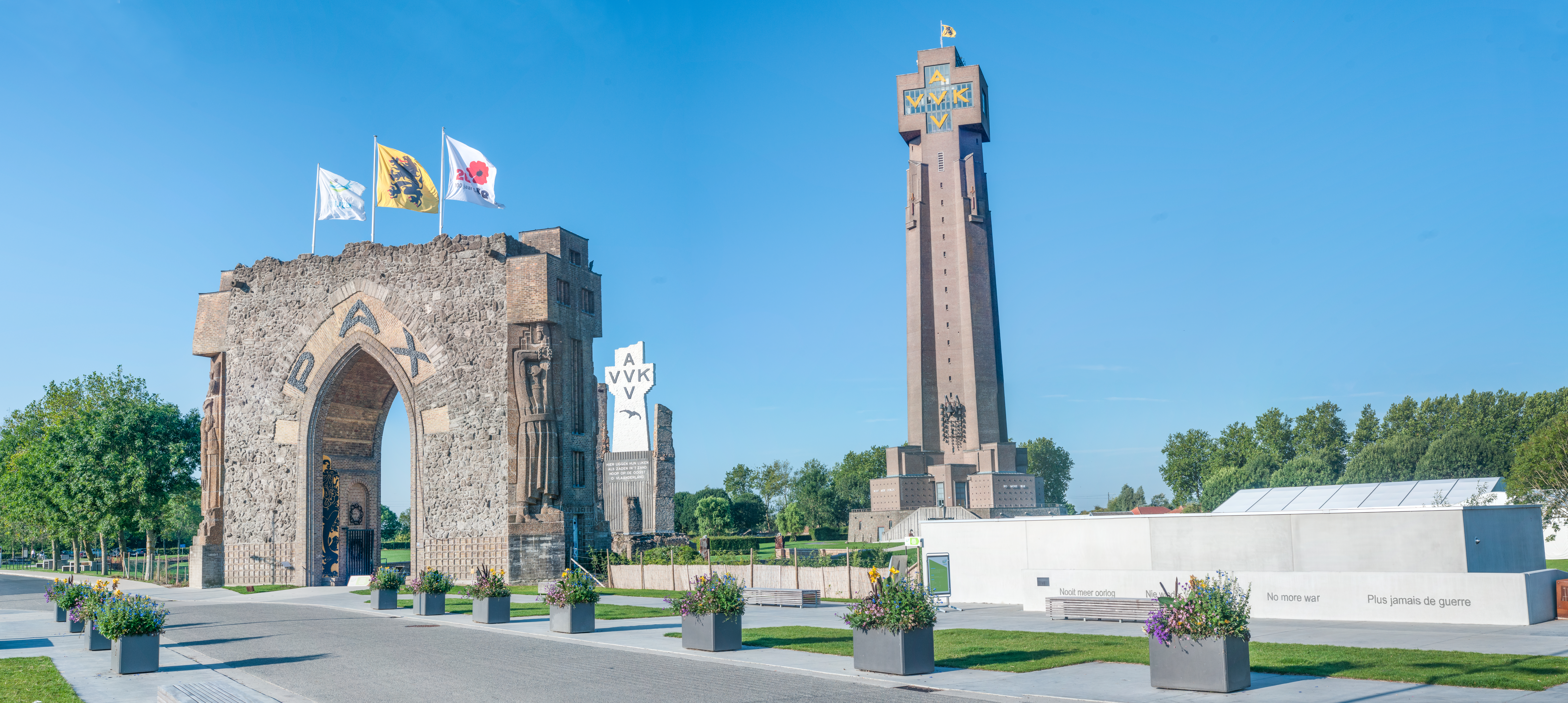
Yser Tower

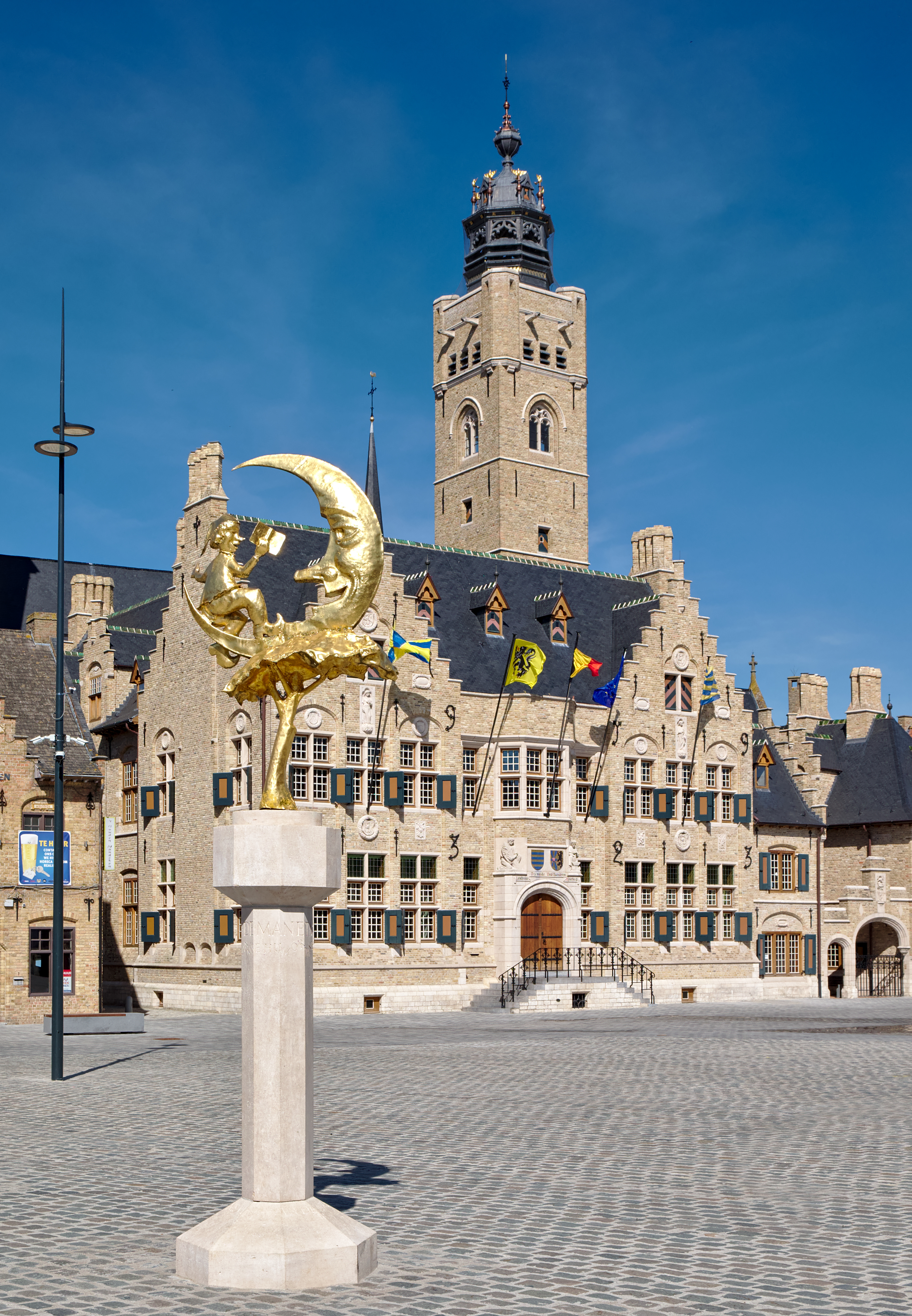
Town hall and belfry

== Notable inhabitants ==
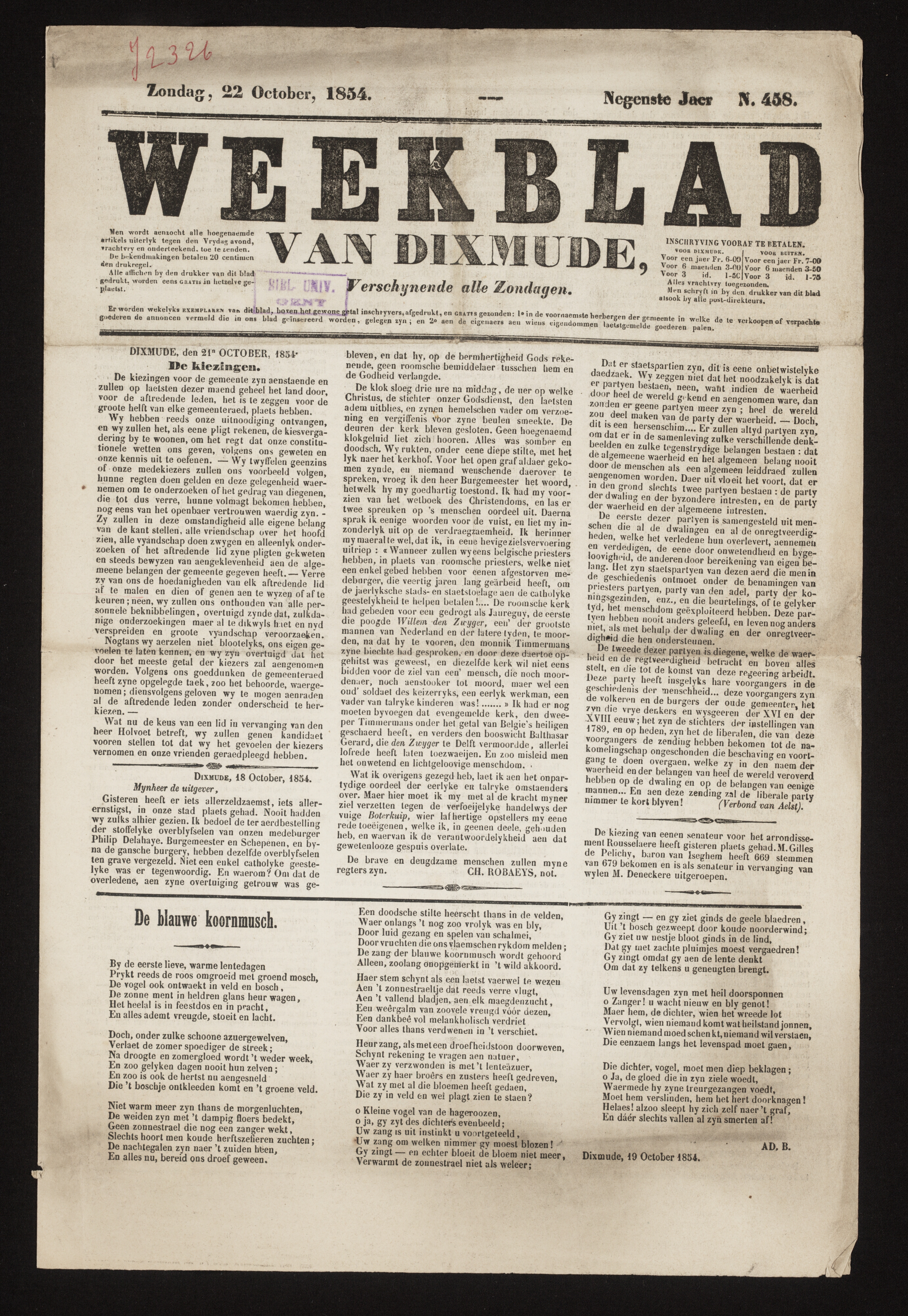
Excerpt from Weekblad van Diksmuide of the year of 1834. Preserved in the Ghent University Library.

- Pierre Morel-Danheel (1773–1856), politician
- Maria Doolaeghe (1803–1884), writer
- Wim Vansevenant, record three-time Tour de France Lanterne rouge winner

== Twin cities ==
- Ellesmere, United Kingdom
- Ploemeur, France
- Rottach-Egern, Germany
- Finnentrop, Germany
