= Nieuwkapelle =

Coordinates: 51°00′N 2°48′E

Nieuwkapelle is a town in Diksmuide, a part of Belgium.

== See also ==
- West Flanders
