= Statistics Belgium =

Belgium's principal government institution in charge of statistics and census data

Coordinates: 50°51′29.61″N 4°21′20.41″E

Statistics Belgium (abbreviated Statbel formerly known as the NSI) is part of the Federal Public Service Economy, SMEs, Self-Employed and Energy. Its legal Dutch name is Algemene Directie Statistiek, and its legal French name is Direction générale Statistique.

Statistics Belgium conducts surveys among households and enterprises in Belgium. It uses and processes existing administrative databases (the national register) and provides data to Belgian and international authorities and organisations. Third parties may also call on its statistical expertise. Statistics Belgium is also the official representative of Belgium to international organisations such as Eurostat and OECD. Sets of figures, press releases and studies are published on its website, Statbel. Moreover, a number of databases can be queried through the online application be.STAT.

== Mission and tasks ==
Its main mission can be summarized in three words: collecting, processing and disseminating relevant, reliable and commented data on Belgian society.

“Collecting” means to seek information among economic and social actors. Data are collected directly or indirectly. For surveys respondents are directly interviewed by interviewers. Indirect data collection refers to the use of administrative files (NSSO, VAT, Crossroads Bank for Enterprises...). This method is increasingly used and reduces the response burden and costs for enterprises and individuals.

“Processing” primarily means to assess data in a critical way. Results are then checked and validated by assessing their quality and their plausibility. Finally summary tables are drawn using basic data. By aggregating and comparing different types of data, Statistics Belgium adds value to initial figures.

“Disseminating” means to make collected data available to the widest public (in accordance with the rules on personal privacy):

- Authorities (all Belgian political authorities at any level, but also international authorities and organisations);
- Enterprises (all enterprises regardless of their size or their interests);
- Society (researchers, journalists, professors, students and others)

Statistics Belgium disseminates statistical information on:

- Households (population figures, household budget, time use, holiday habits...);
- Industry, construction, trade and other services (data from surveys among enterprises);
- Economic situation such as indexes (e.g. consumer price index) and economic indicators on industrial production, investments, export, employment, retail activity, services sector...

== Surveys ==
The surveys conducted by Statistics Belgium include surveys on labour force, income and living conditions, structure and distribution of earnings, structural business statistics, agriculture, Census 2011 (formerly known as “population count”) and household budget.

Statistics Belgium also conducts several major surveys in collaboration with other institutions. Examples include the health survey conducted by the Scientific Institute of Public Health and the time use survey carried out by the TOR research group from the Vrije Universiteit Brussel. Other public institutions may call on its expertise.

== See also ==
- Royal Statistical Society of Belgium
