= 1921 in art =

Events from the year 1921 in art.

== Events ==
- March – Puhl & Wagner are contracted to decorate the interior of the Golden Hall (Stockholm City Hall) with neo-Byzantine mosaics designed by Einar Forseth.
- September–October – 5x5=25 abstract art exhibition held in Moscow.
- unknown dates
  - The first of the Western Front demarcation stones, designed by Paul Moreau-Vauthier, are erected in France and Belgium.
  - The experimental short documentary film Manhatta is shot by painter Charles Sheeler and photographer Paul Strand in New York City.
  - Thomas Gainsborough's c. 1770 portrait The Blue Boy from the collection of the Duke of Westminster is sold by dealer Joseph Duveen to California magnate Henry E. Huntington for $728,800 (£182,200; equivalent to $13 million in 2025), according to Duveen's bill, a record price for any painting at this time.
  - André Delatte opens his glasswares studio in Nancy.
  - Simon Rodia begins construction of the Watts Towers in Los Angeles.

== Awards ==
- Archibald Prize: W B McInnes – Desbrowe Annear

== Works ==
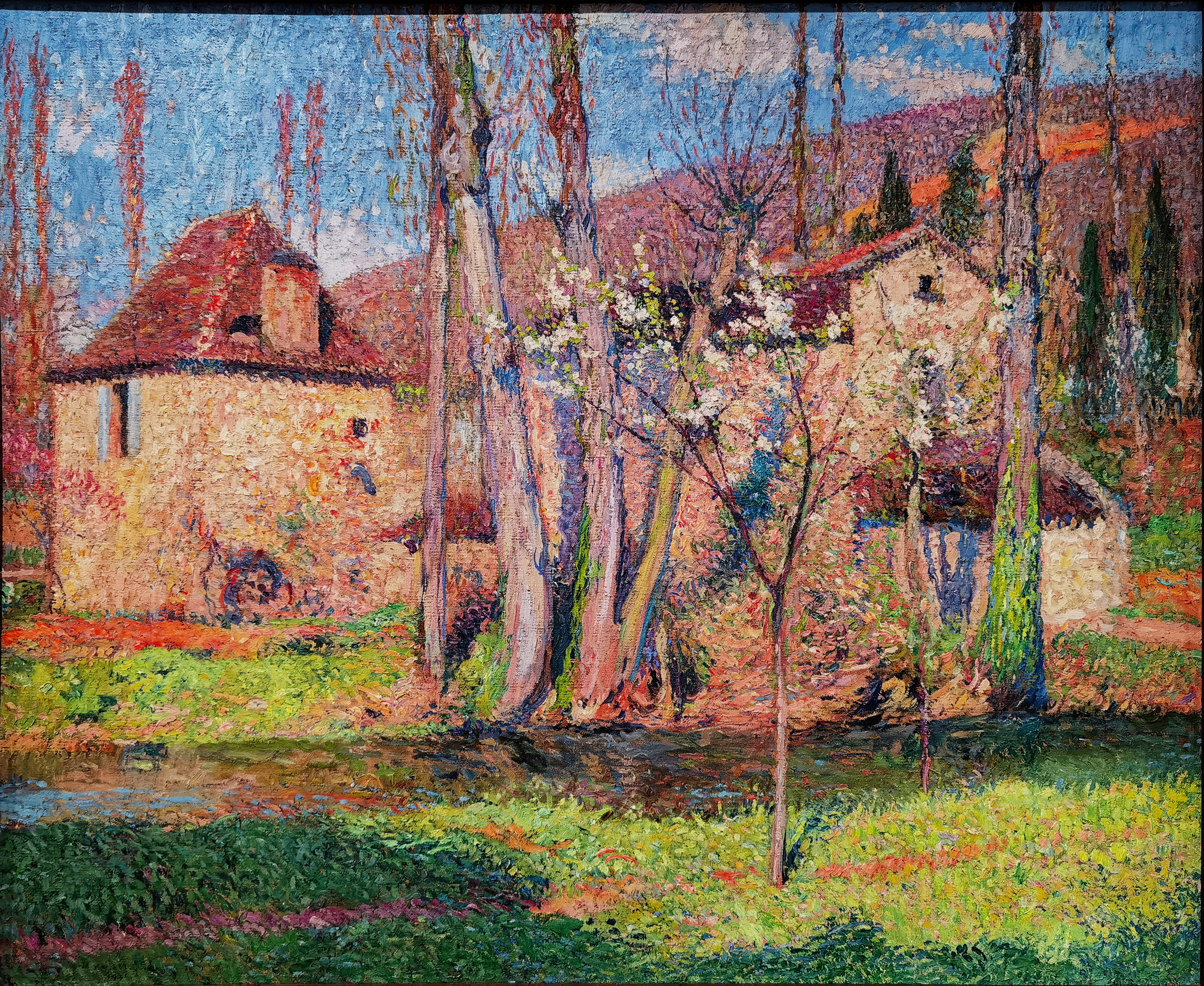
Henri Martin – Chaumières au printemps (Thatched cottages in spring)

- Carlo Carrà – The Engineer's Lover
- Dora Carrington – Farm at Watendlath
- Arthur Stockdale Cope – Naval Officers of World War I
- Charles Demuth – Incense of a New Church
- Guy Pène du Bois – An American Oriental
- Marcel Duchamp – Why Not Sneeze, Rose Sélavy? (assisted readymade)
- Max Ernst – The Elephant Celebes
- Daniel Chester French – Statue of the Marquis de Lafayette (Lafayette College)
- Jean-Léon Gérôme - Matoax
- Lady Feodora Gleichen – 37th (British) Division memorial (Monchy-le-Preux, France)
- J. W. Godward – Megilla
- Duncan Grant – Bathers by the Pond
- Auguste Herbin – Le Cateau-Cambrésis
- Hans Heysen - Droving into the Light
- Edward Hopper – Girl at Sewing Machine
- Wassily Kandinsky – Weisses Oval (White Oval)
- Seán Keating – Men of the South
- Ernst Ludwig Kirchner
  - Two Brothers
  - View of Basel and the Rhine
- Boris Kustodiev – Portrait of Chaliapin
- Fernand Léger
  - Man and Woman
  - Still Life with a Beer Mug
- Wyndham Lewis – Mr Wyndham Lewis as a Tyro
- Sir Bertram Mackennal – Bronze equestrian statue of King Edward VII (Waterloo Place, London)
- Piet Mondrian
  - Composition with Red, Yellow and Blue
  - Tableau I
- Edvard Munch – Model by the Wicker Chair
- Alfred Munnings – The Red Prince Mare
- William Orpen
  - Le Chef de l'Hôtel Chatham, Paris
  - Portrait of Earl Haig
- Francis Picabia
  - The Cacodylic Eye
  - Cannibale
- Pablo Picasso
  - Reading the Letter
  - Three Musicians (two versions)
  - Three Women at the Spring
- Man Ray (with Erik Satie) – The Gift (readymade sculpture)
- Stanley Spencer
  - Christ's Entry into Jerusalem
  - Crucifixion
- Félix Vallotton – Femme nue dormant au bord de l'eau
- Han van Meegeren – Hertje ("The fawn")
- Owe Zerge – Victoria Mortis

== Publications ==
- Paul Sérusier – ABC de la peinture

== Births ==
=== January to June ===
- January 1 – César Baldaccini, French sculptor (d. 1998)
- January 3 – Bill Gold, American graphic designer (d. 2018)
- January 14 – Norris Embry, American neo-expressionist painter (d. 1981)
- January 17 – Antonio Prohías, Cuban-born American comics artist and cartoonist (d. 1998)
- January 24 – Sybil Connolly, Welsh-Irish fashion designer (d. 1998)
- January 27 – Georges Mathieu, French abstract painter (d. 2012)
- February 2 – Pietro Cascella, Italian painter and sculptor (d. 2008)
- February 5 – Ken Adam, German-born British film set designer (d. 2016)
- February 13 – Louis Féraud, French fashion designer and artist (d. 1999)
- February 20 – Michael Ayrton, English sculptor, graphic artist and writer (d. 1975)
- February 22 – Cecil King, Irish abstract-minimalist painter (d. 1986)
- February 23 – John Latham, Zambian conceptual artist (d. 2006)
- March 2 – Ernst Haas, Austrian photographer (d. 1986)
- March 13 – Al Jaffee, American cartoonist (d. 2023)
- March 28 – Norman Bluhm, American painter (d. 1999)
- April 21 – Dimitrije Bašičević, Serbian painter and sculptor (d. 1987)
- April 23 – William Brice, American painter and teacher (d. 2008)
- April 25 – Karel Appel, Dutch painter, sculptor and poet (d. 2006)
- May 18 – Joan Eardley, British painter (d. 1963)
- May 29 – Enzo Plazzotta, Italian-born British sculptor (d. 1981)
- June 20 – Fiore de Henriquez, Italian-born British sculptor (d. 2004)

=== July to December ===
- July 16
  - Ernst Beyeler, Swiss art dealer and collector (d. 2010)
  - Guy Laroche, French fashion designer (d. 1989)
- July 16 – Boscoe Holder, Trinidadian painter (d. 2007)
- July 17 – Richard Jeranian, Armenian painter, draftsman and lithographer (d. 2019)
- August 4 – Jean Pierre Capron, French painter (d. 1997)
- August 18 – Zdzisław Żygulski, Jr., Polish art historian (d. 2015)
- August 28 – Jean-Philippe Charbonnier, French photographer (d. 2004)
- September 22 – Will Elder, American illustrator and comic book artist (d. 2008)
- September 25 – Jacques Martin, French comics creator (d. 2010)
- September 27 – Jean-Pierre Sudre, French photographer (d. 1997)
- October 26 – Raymond Nasher, American art collector (d. 2007)
- November 12 – Gerson Leiber, American painter, lithographer and sculptor (d. 2018)
- November 17 – Albert Bertelsen, Danish artist (d. 2019)
- November 26 – Françoise Gilot, French watercolorist and ceramicist (d. 2023)

== Deaths ==
- January 18 – Adolf von Hildebrand, sculptor (born 1847)
- January 30 – John Francis Murphy, landscape painter (born 1853)
- February 2 – Antonio Jacobsen, Danish-American maritime artist (born 1850)
- February 3 – William Strang, painter and engraver (born 1859)
- February 4 – Eugène Burnand, Swiss painter (born 1850)
- February 11 – William Blake Richmond, English painter and designer (born 1842)
- February 21 – George Dunlop Leslie, English genre painter (born 1835)
- March 2 – Johann Friedrich Engel, German painter (born 1844)
- March 23 – Jean-Paul Laurens, painter and sculptor (born 1838)
- March 24 – Marcus Stone, painter and illustrator (born 1840)
- March 30 – Franz Benque, photographer (born 1841)
- April 6 – Vardges Sureniants, Armenian painter (born 1860)
- April 30 – Mabel Esplin, English stained-glass artist (born 1874)
- May 5 – William Friese-Greene, photographer and cinematographer (born 1855)
- May 29 – Abbott Handerson Thayer, painter (born 1849)
- June – Frank Enders, painter and etcher (born 1860)
- October 7 – John Thomson, photographer (born 1837)
- November 1 – Francisco Pradilla Ortiz, painter (born 1848)
- November 12 – Fernand Khnopff, Symbolist painter (born 1858)
- November 13 – William Robert Colton, sculptor (born 1867)
