= To black soldiers who died for France =

French war memorial

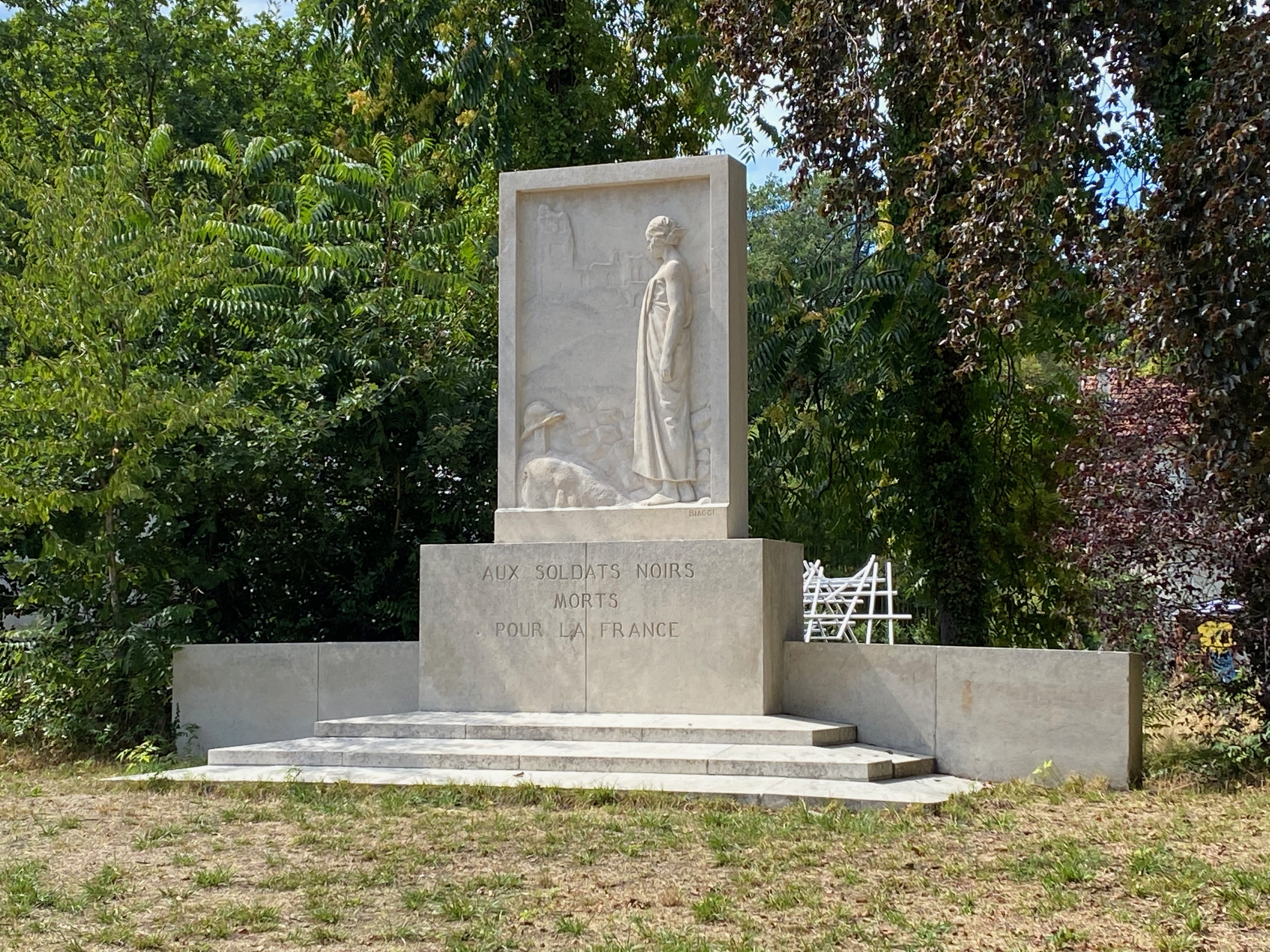

To black soldiers who died for France (French - Aux soldats noirs morts pour la France) is a war memorial by Auguste Biaggi (1878–1965) in the Tropical Agronomy Garden in Paris.

Other French war memorials to their African troops in the First World War are the Monument to the Heroes of the Black Army in Reims, the Armée d'Afrique Memorial in Saint-Raphaël, the Black Army Memorial in Fréjus, the Tirailleur Memorial in Menton and the Merfy monument.

== History ==
A plaster statue of a Sudanese woman was a study for the memorial. The final work consists of a large bas-relief signed by Biaggi showing a landscape of ruins, with a barefoot pensive African widow in a large robe standing in front of her husband's tomb. That tomb is symbolised by a poilu's helmet resting on a stake driven into a mound of earth. The bas-relief rests on a cubic concrete plinth with an engraved inscription.

The date of its inauguration was not mentioned in the press and so remains unknown, although the neighbouring memorial to soldiers from Madagascar was unveiled in a public ceremony in 1925. It seems that initially the only monument to soldiers from France's African colonies was an oak planted at the start of the Champs-Élysées in 1925 and that the Garden memorial is later. It was made a monument historique in 1994.
