= Gibrahayer =

Established in September 1999, Gibrahayer e-magazine (Կիպրահայեր), is an online newsletter, reaching over 35.000 subscribers in Cyprus, the Armenian Diaspora, Armenia and Artsakh. The website has had over 1,300.000 visitors. Most of its contents are in English, but it also carries some Armenian language articles, as well as articles in Greek and Turkish.

Founder and Editor-in-Chief is Simon Aynedjian.

In October 2010, the magazine won an International Media Award from the Ministry of Diaspora at the All-Armenian Media conference in Stepanakert, the capital of Artsakh. For its news dissemination, Gibrahayer relies on a network of two dozen volunteer correspondents across the world.

In September 2014, the Editor-in-Chief Simon Aynedjian was decorated by the Movses Khorenatsi Award by the President of Armenia.
