= Dodengang =

World War I memorial site in Belgium

Coordinates: 51.0468°N 2.8436°E

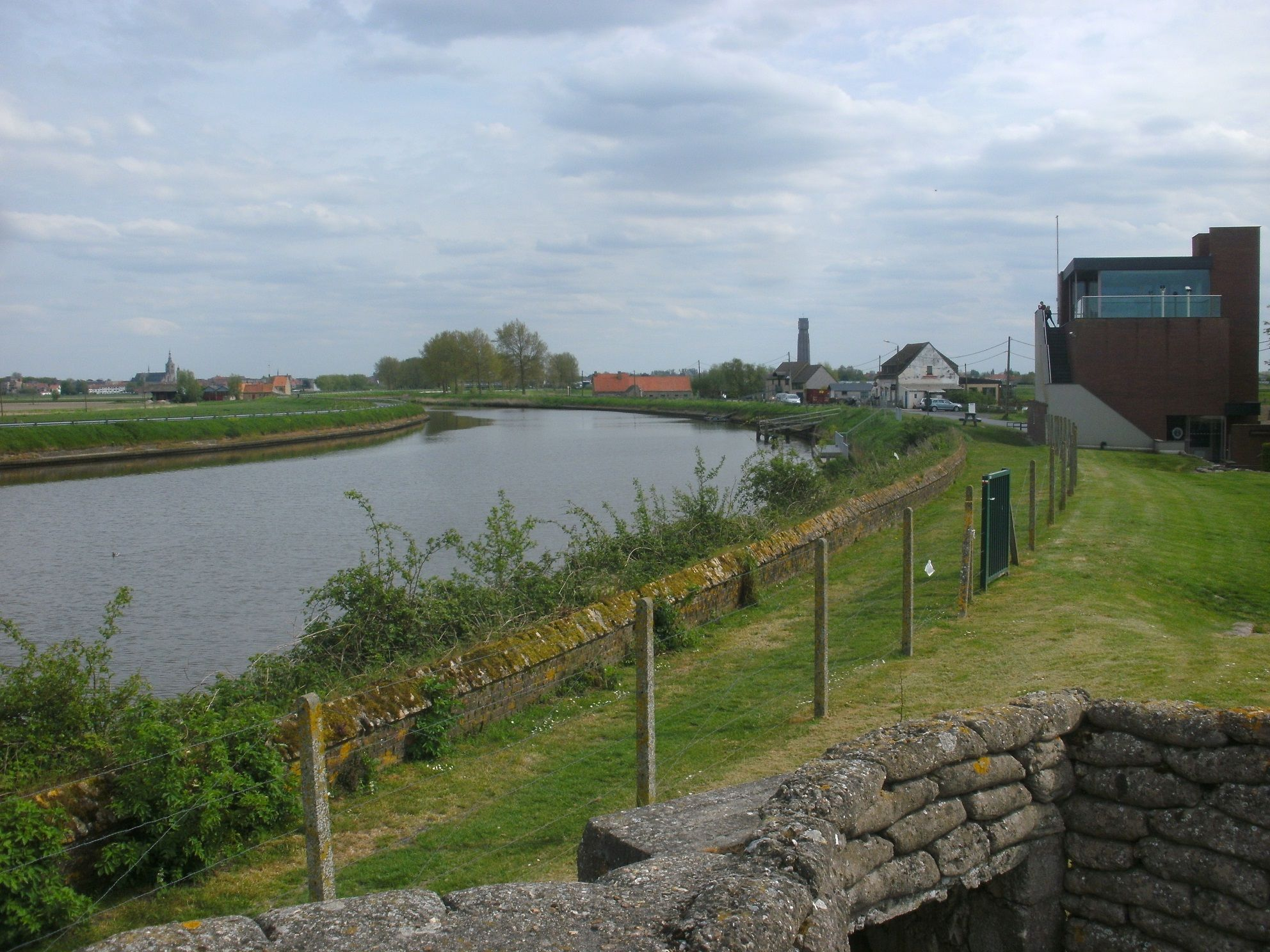
Yser Canal bank with the new Dodengang museum on the right

The Dodengang (Dutch, also called Trench of Death in English and Le Boyau de la mort in French) is a World War I memorial site located near Diksmuide, Belgium. The site is located about 1.5 kilometres (0.93 mi) from the IJzertoren in the centre of the city, and is set directly on the banks of the Yser Canal.

== Memorial site ==
The Dodengang is a 300 yards (270 m) section of the preserved trench where many soldiers were killed in World War I. The trench was begun at the time of the Battle of the Yser and was defended by soldiers of the Belgian Army. As part of the Yser Front, it played a key role in preserving the front line in this area and stopping further German incursions across the Yser Canal. Belgian soldiers fought here under the most perilous conditions until the final offensive on 28 September 1918.

In the Battle of the Yser, the Belgian army retreated behind the Yser Canal and dug in. The Belgian fortifications on the Yser Front along the canal bank consisted of a trench and a series of bunkers, all designed to halt the German advance.

To the north of the Belgian fortifications is an area where the German army successfully crossed the Yser Canal and erected a concrete bunker, only a few yards away from where the Belgian army held the position.

=== Museum ===
After the war, the Dodengang became one of the first memorial sites in Belgium to be opened to the public as a tourist attraction. A new museum was built on the site in recent years.

=== Demarcation stone ===
A demarcation stone was unveiled here in 1922 by King Albert. It forms part of a series of stone markers all along the Western Front line from the North Sea to the Swiss border. The markers are carved from pink granite and are about one metre high. On the top of the demarcation stone is a laurel wreath surmounted by the helmet of the Belgian army which stopped the German advance here.

== Gallery ==
=== Memorial site ===
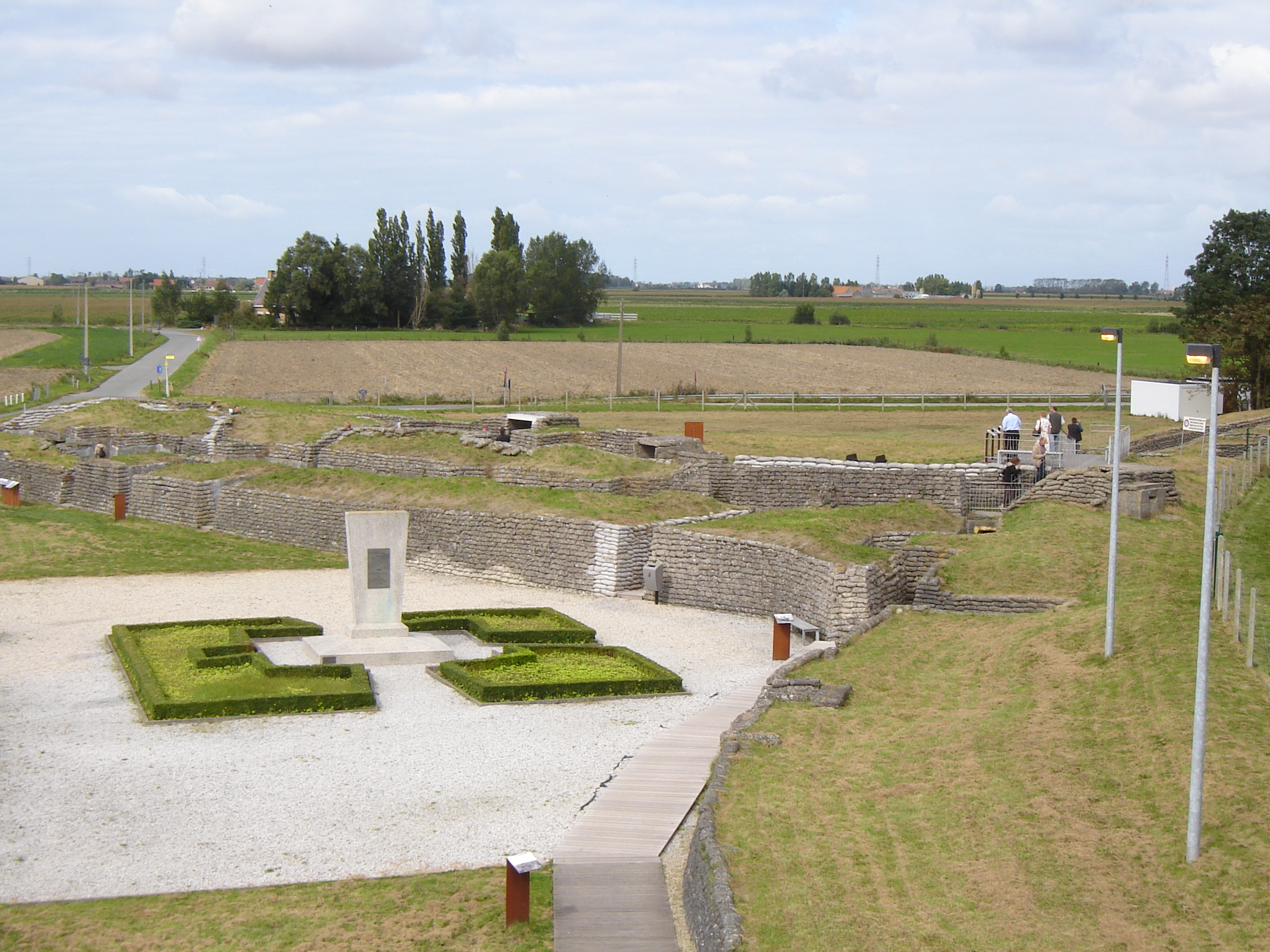
Yard with memorial

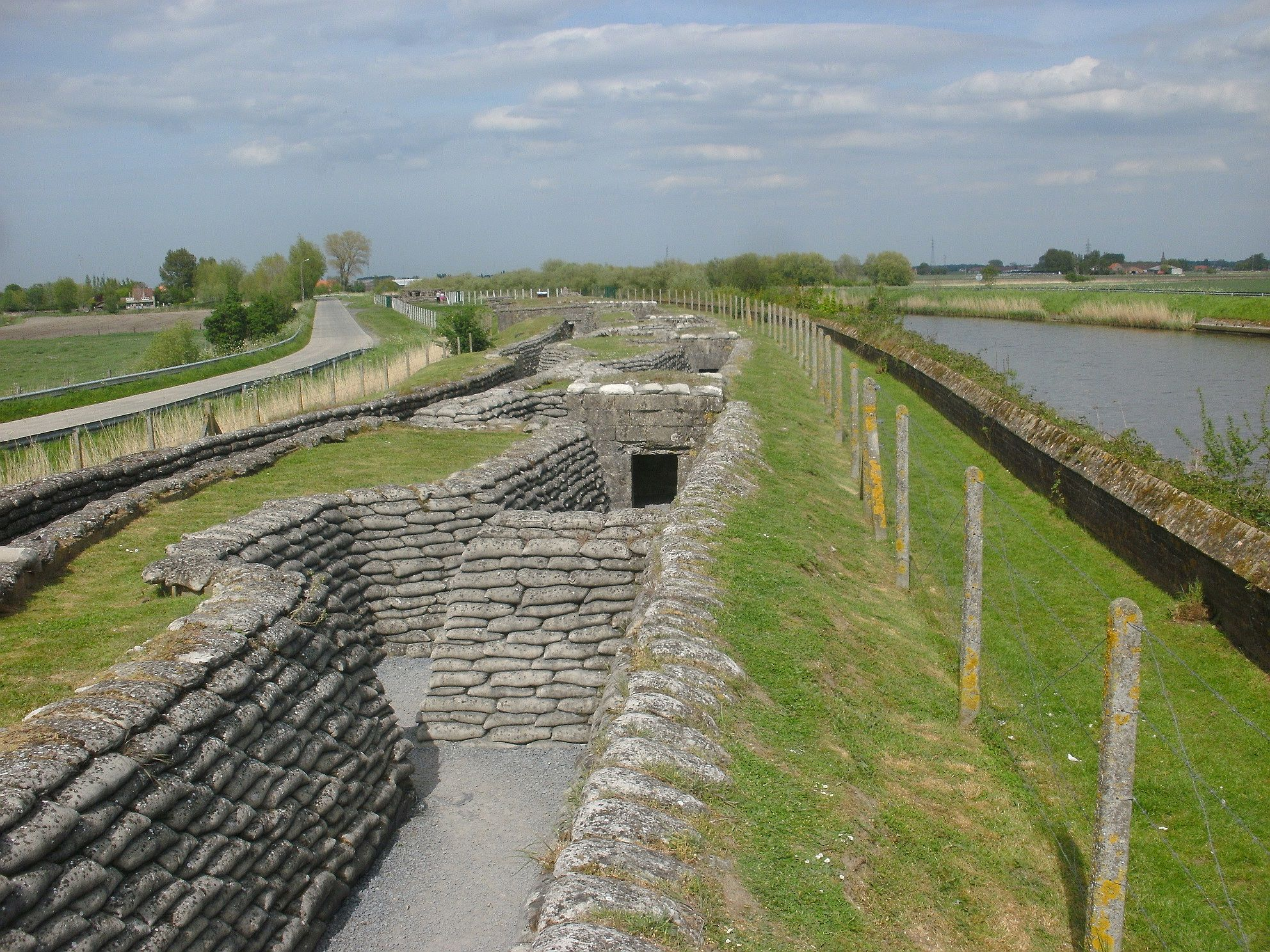
Belgian fortifications

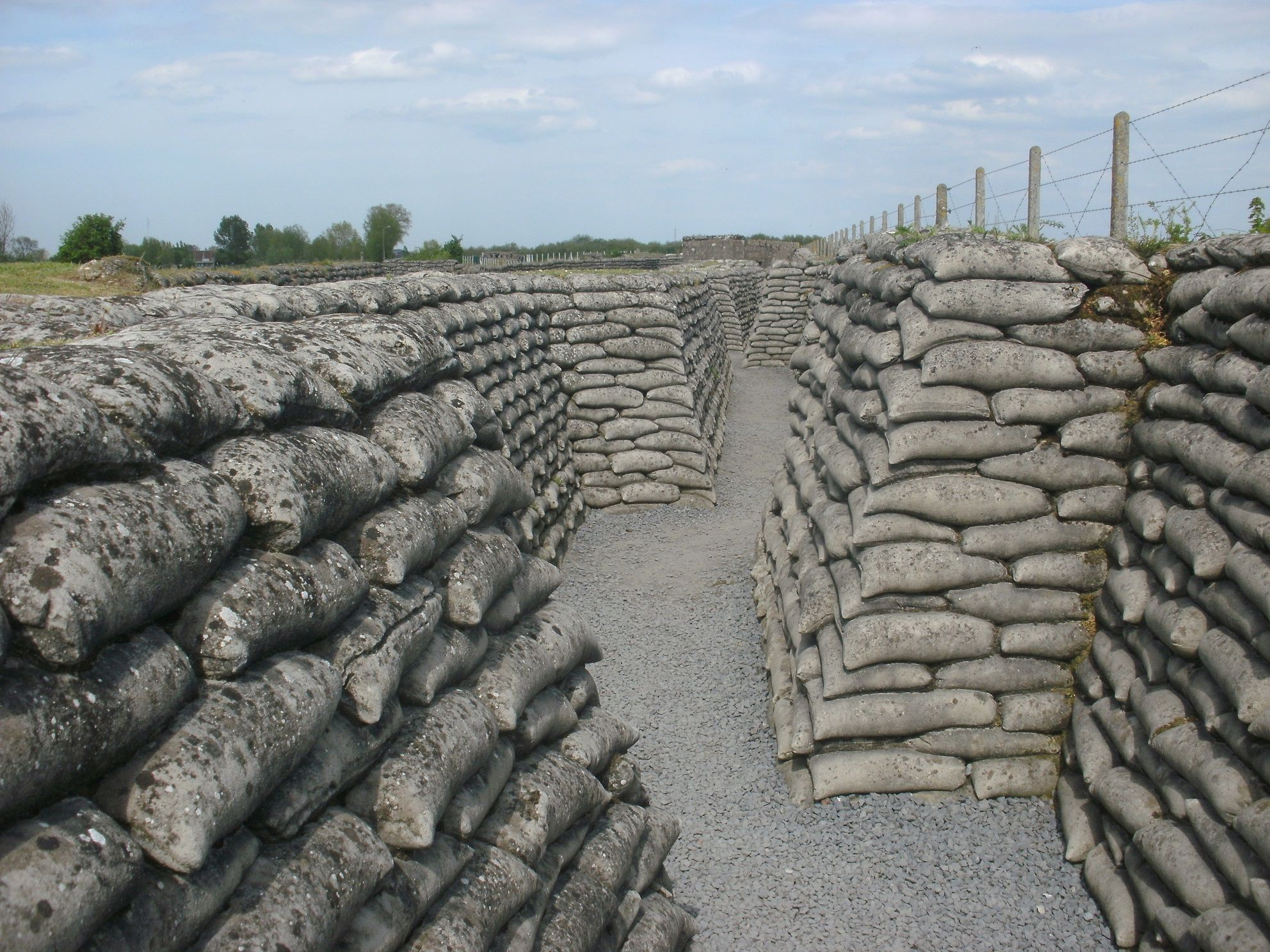
Inside the trenches

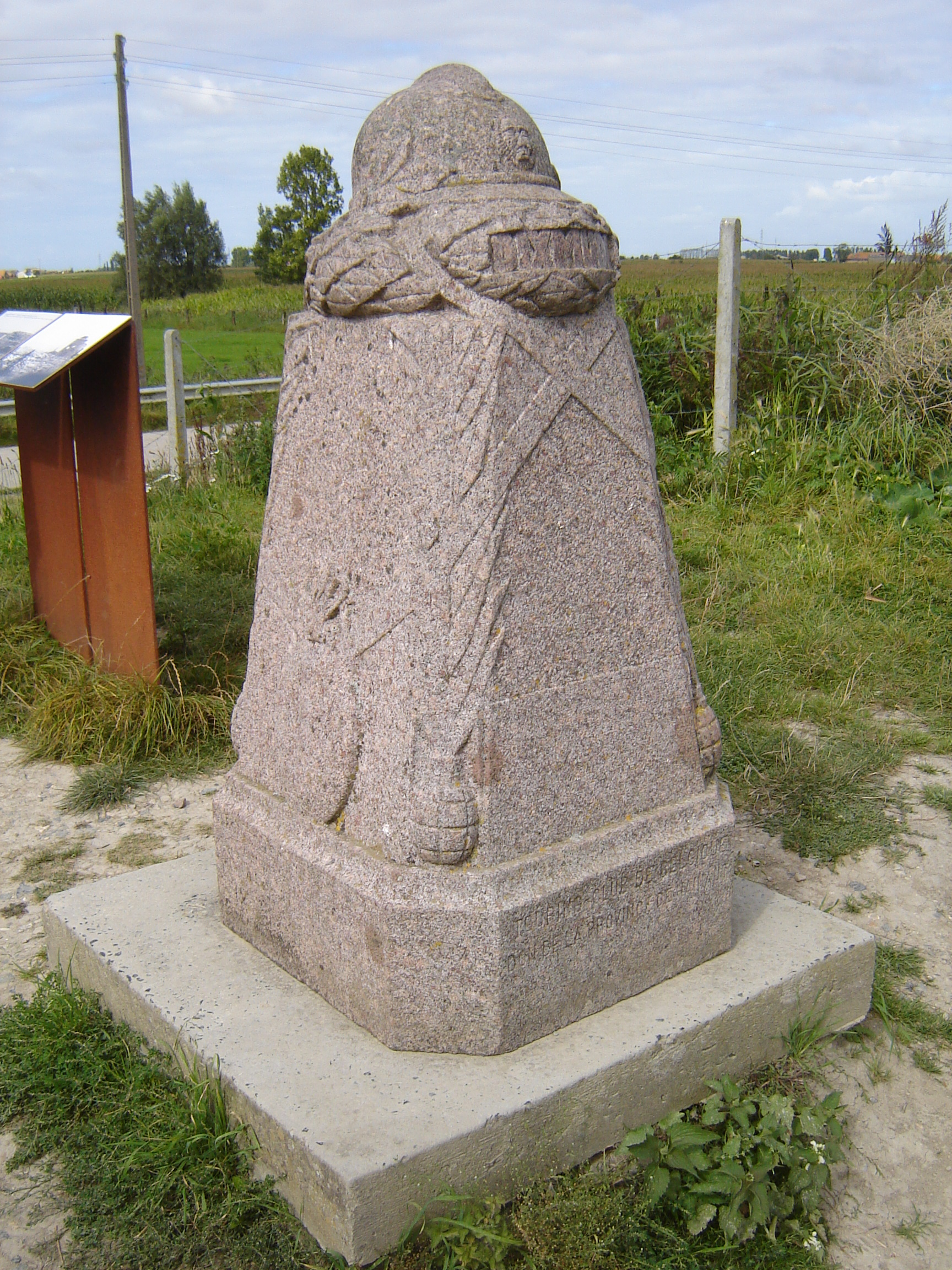
Demarcation stone

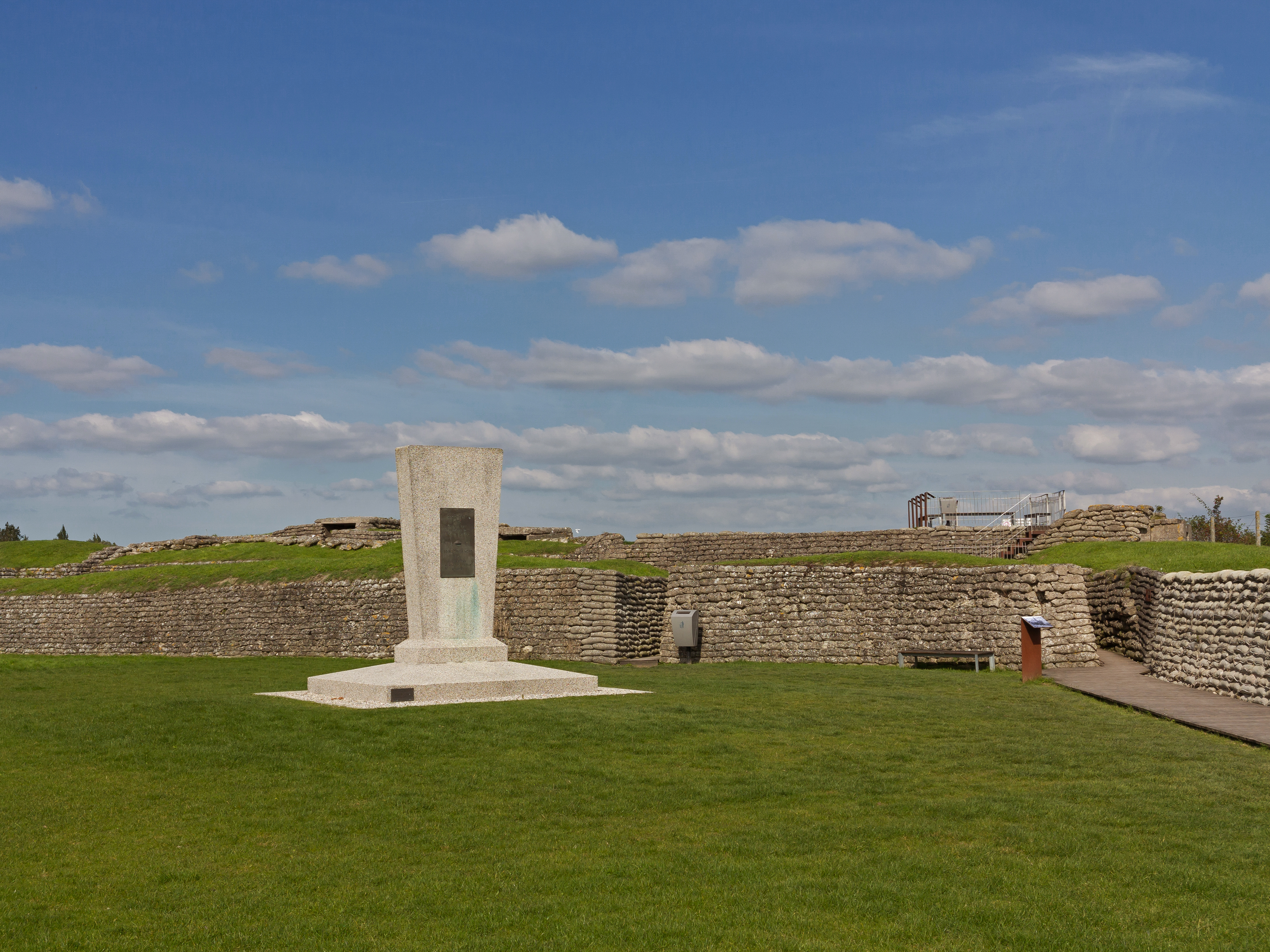
War memorial Dodengang

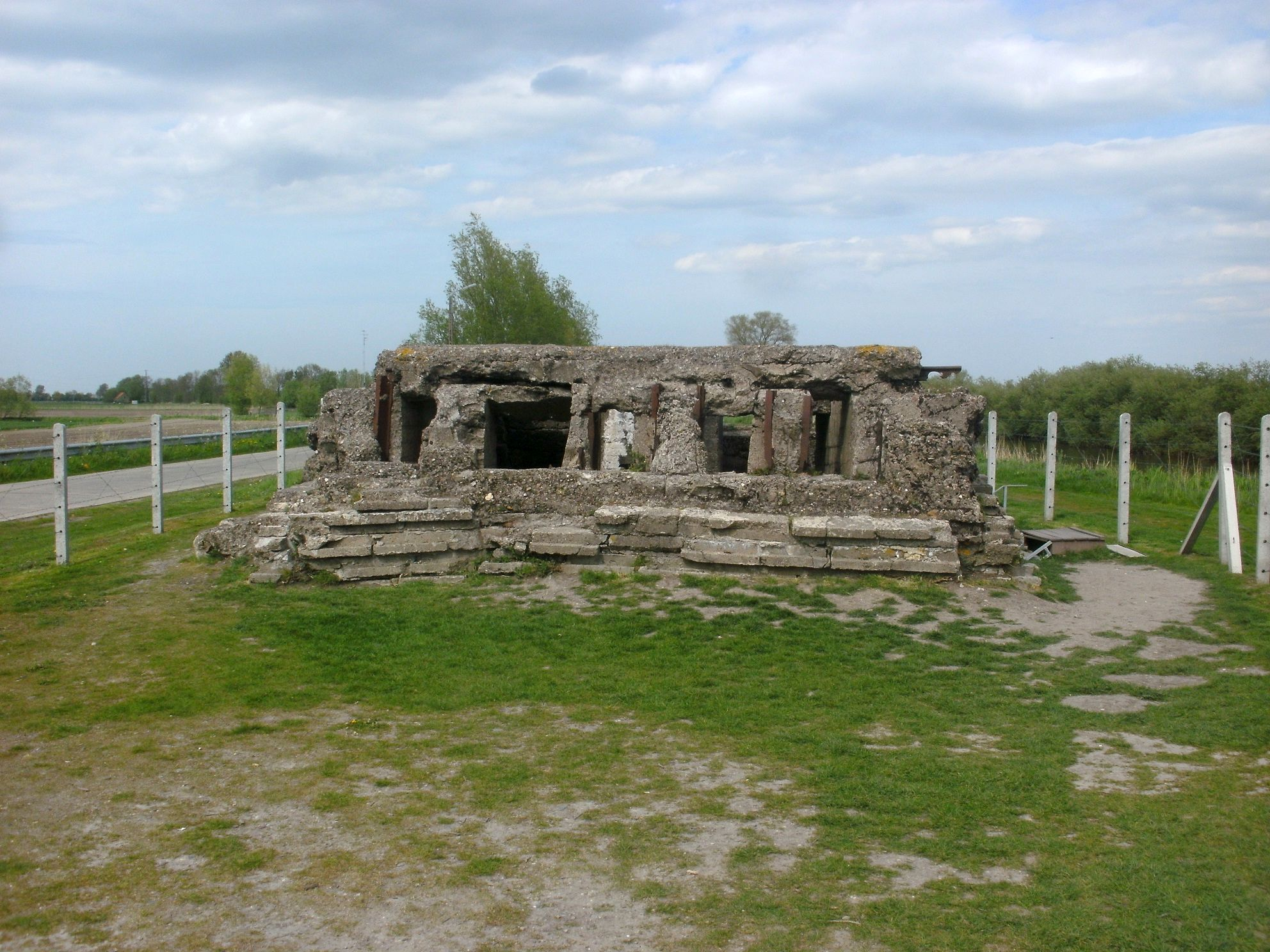
German bunker

=== Landscape ===
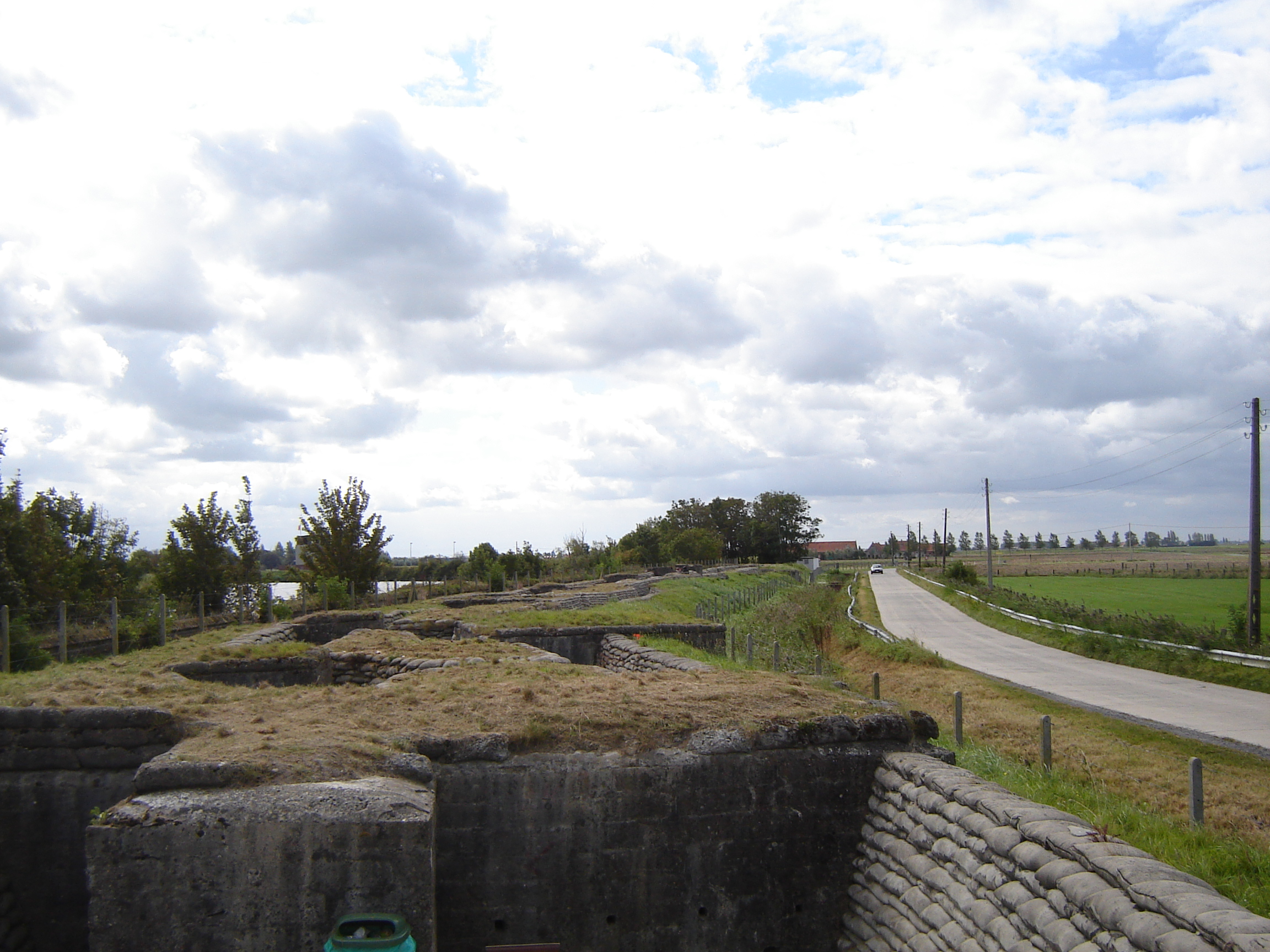

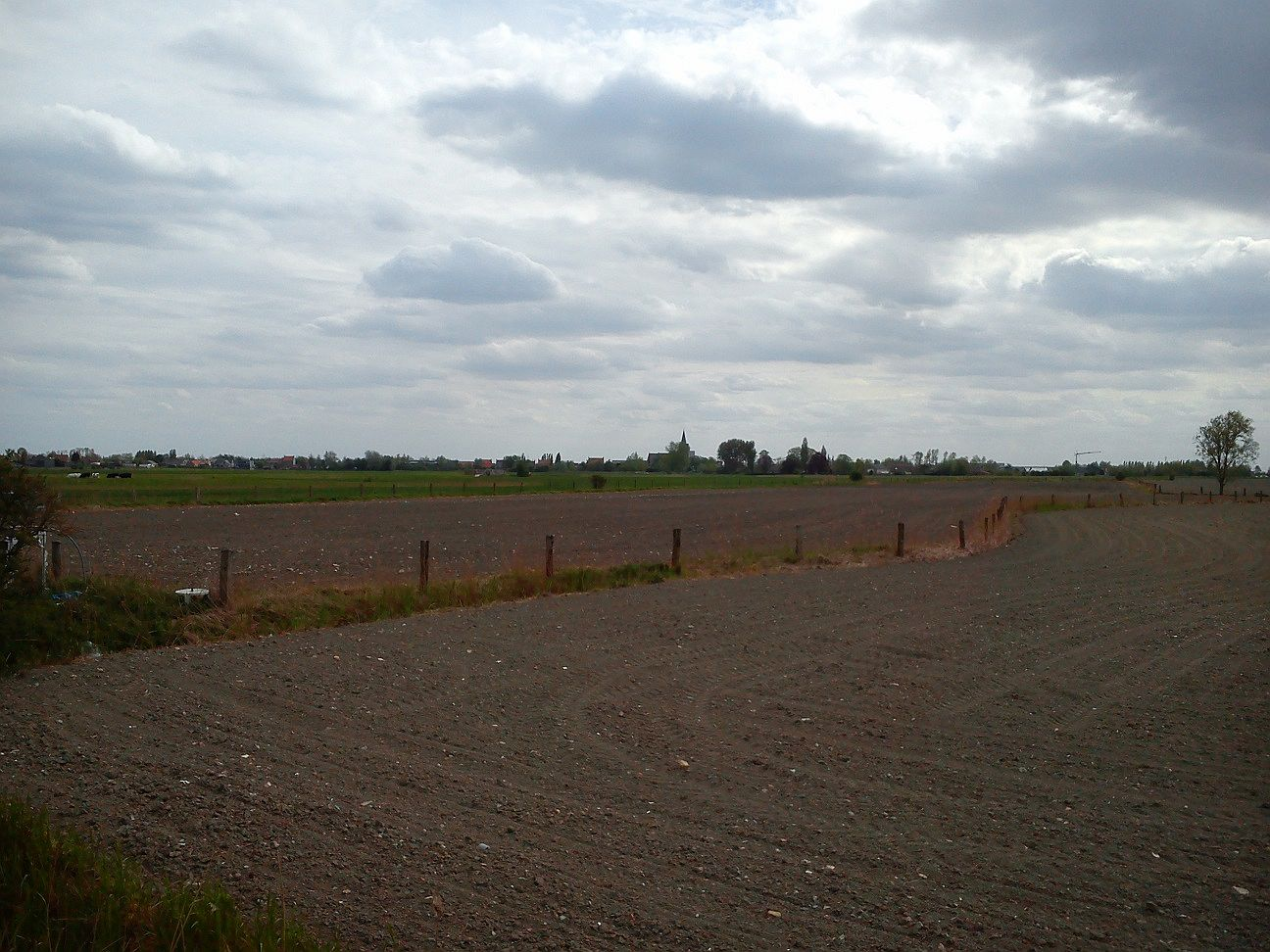

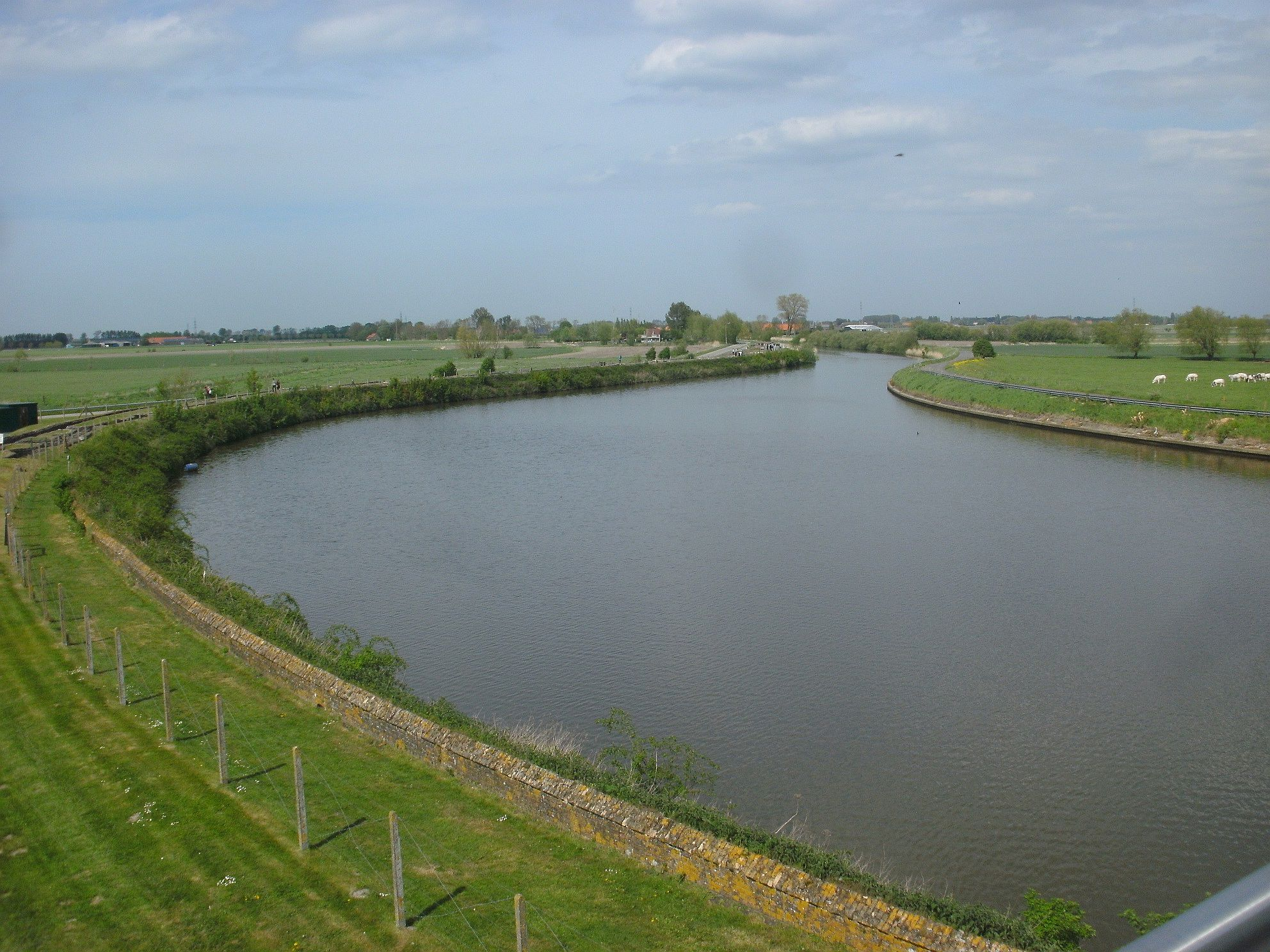

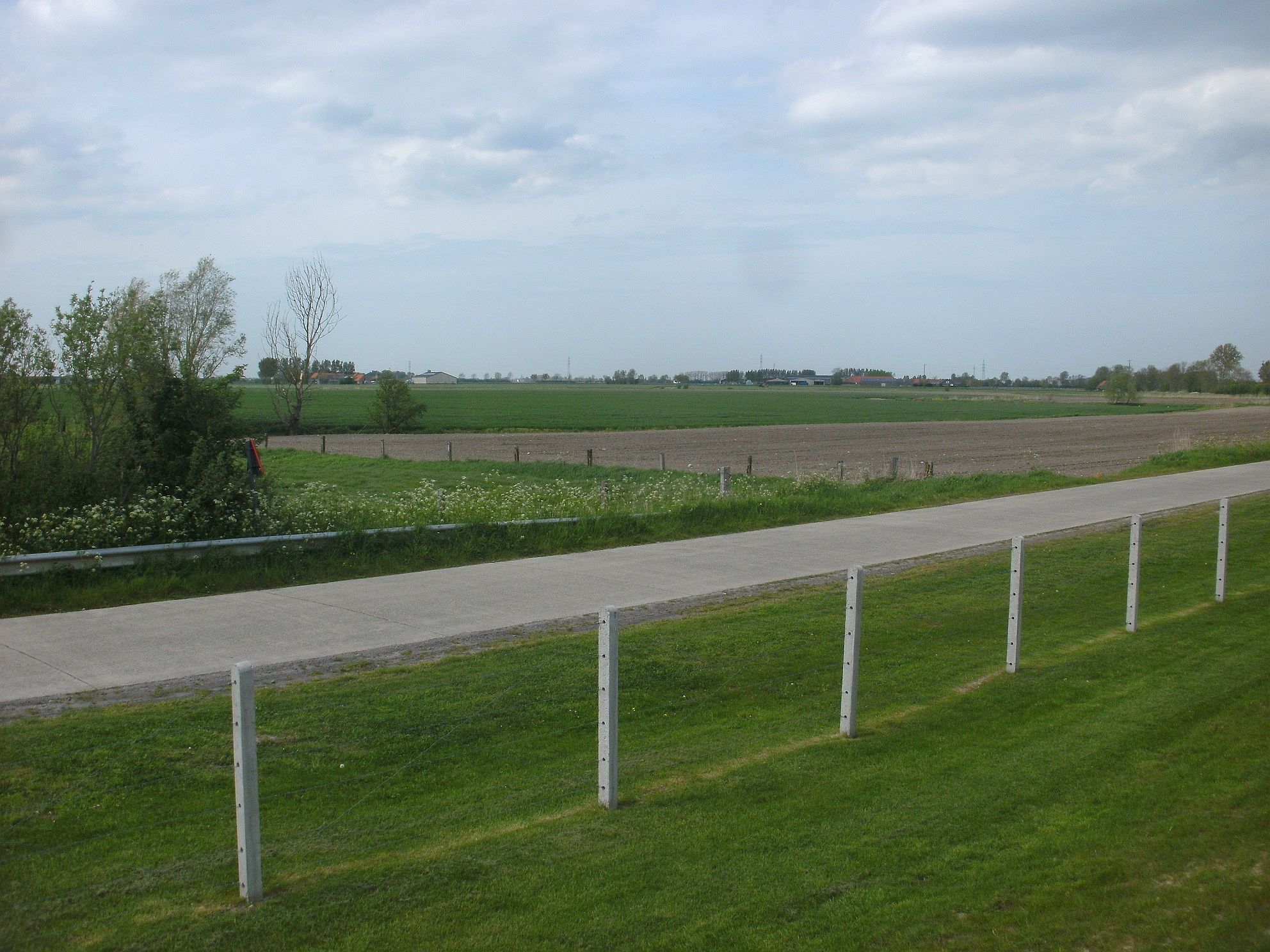

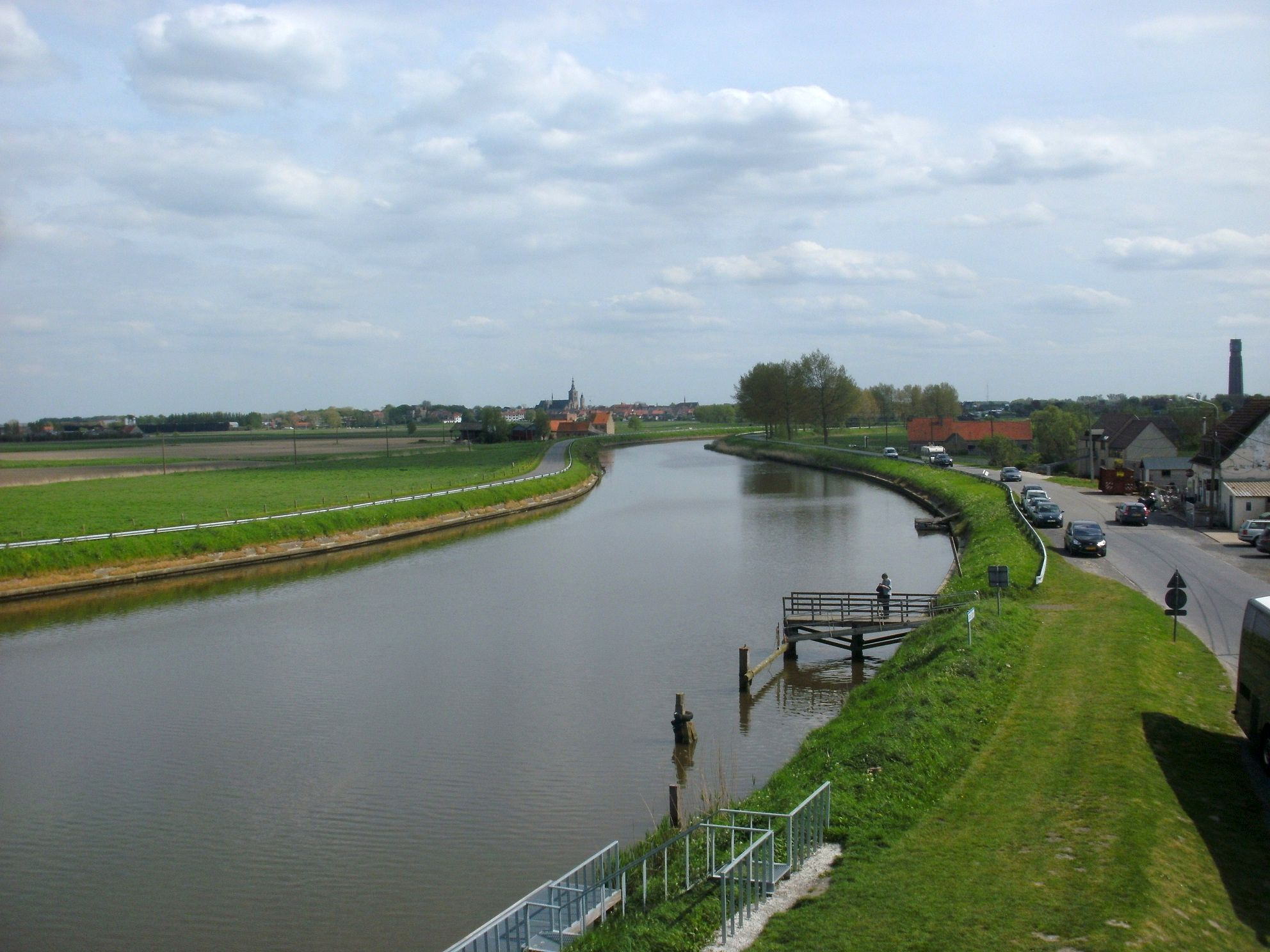

== See also ==
- List of World War I memorials and cemeteries in Flanders
