= Ieperlee =

Canalised river in Belgium

Ieperlee (Ypres-Ijzer Canal)
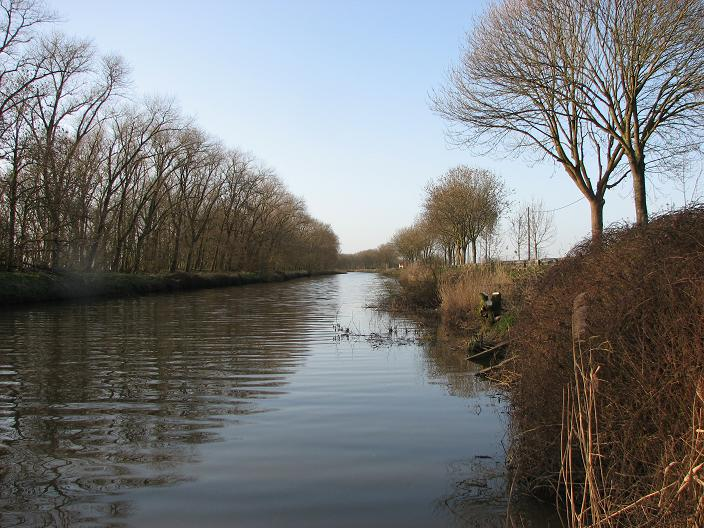
- The Ieperlee, near Fort Knokke
- Country: Belgium

Specifications
- Length: 17 km (11 miles)

Geography
- Direction: South
- Start point: Ijzer River
- End point: Ypres
- Beginning coordinates: 50.980°N 2.806°E
- Ending coordinates: 50.858°N 2.885°E

The Ieperlee (or Ypres-Ijzer Canal) is a canalized river that rises in Heuvelland in the Belgian province of West Flanders and flows via the city of Ypres (Ieper) into the Yser at Fort Knokke.

The river is 17 kilometres (11 mi) long. Its name is derived from iep, the Dutch word for elm. It gave its name to the city of Ypres. In the 11th century the river was canalized to link the city, which had a thriving cloth industry, to the sea. Even in 1842, some 2,034 boats still passed the lock at Boezinge. Today, the canal is only used for recreational purposes.

During the First World War, the river was part of the frontline. It linked the Ypres Salient, held by the French and English, to the Yser Front, held by the Belgian Army (see Dodengang).

== Tributaries ==
- Bollaerbeek
- Zillebeek
