= Droving Into the Light =

Painting by Hans Heysen

Droving into the light
- Artist: Hans Heysen
- Year: 1921
- Medium: oil on canvas
- Dimensions: 121.9 cm × 152.4 cm (48.0 in × 60.0 in)
- Location: Art Gallery of Western Australia, Perth
- Website: https://collection.artgallery.wa.gov.au/objects/616/droving-into-the-light

Droving Into the Light, originally titled Into the Light, is a 1921 painting by Australian artist Hans Heysen. The painting was composed over a period of seven years from 1914 to 1921. It is part of the collection of the Art Gallery of Western Australia in Perth.

== Description ==
The painting deviates from Heysen's well known use of water colour as an oil painting on canvas. It depicts a drover, an Australian term for a person who moves livestock over long distances, transporting sheep along a road which appears to lead down a gradual incline. The vast, sunbathed landscape presented in the background of the artwork is likely inspired by the nature of the countryside of the Adelaide Hills, an area 28 kilometres (17 mi) south east of South Australia's capital city Adelaide. Heysen resided for the majority of his life in this area in the small town of Hahndorf, thus receiving the inspiration for Droving Into the Light and his other works, most of which depict this natural landscape in some way.

Essential to the composition of the artwork are the salient eucalyptus trees, which became a prominent symbol of Heysen's oeuvre throughout the course of his career. Of note in Droving Into the Light specifically is the large river red gum (Eucalyptus camaldulensis), which was an afterthought of Heysen's that intended to bring the fine elements of the work together in the later period of its composition:

... I realised the weakness of the composition and repainted portions, introducing the large central Red Gum. This helped to bind the two sides and made a great improvement, materially enhancing the whole conception.

— Hans Heysen, letter to A.C Kenrick

=== Use of Light ===
The painting is acclaimed for its use of light and the interaction of the sun with the landscape and the trees which cover the drover and his sheep. It has been described as "Heysen’s most successful use of light in all his eucalyptus paintings in oil." Heysen's use of oil paints allow for a stark contrast between the light bathing the verdant landscape in the background and the shadowed behinds of the trees facing the sun. These fissures of light between the shadows of the trees from the bright sun in the distance are what gives the viewer a sense of being on a journey with the drover, his sheep, and sheepdog, creating a "complex play of dynamic compositional elements which rescue it from potential banality" as described by Tracy Lock-Weir for the painting's exhibition in the National Gallery of Australia. An identifying motif of Heysen's work and one which is salient in Droving into the Light, the eponymous light inspires and shapes Heysen's oeuvre and the emotion he endeavored to capture in his works: "It’s a great life to feel you can open your lungs, swing your arms and shout whenever you like on a hilltop flooded in sunshine…". Thus the painting serves as a culmination of Heysen's fascination with light, "the sun ... its light and warmth ... is my religion". This fascination was born on his return to Adelaide from Europe in 1903. Sailing in Gulf St Vincent off the southern coast of Australia, he reported that Australian light "was like a slap in the face"; profoundly changing his attitude towards art and the vision he had for his future compositions.

== Significance ==
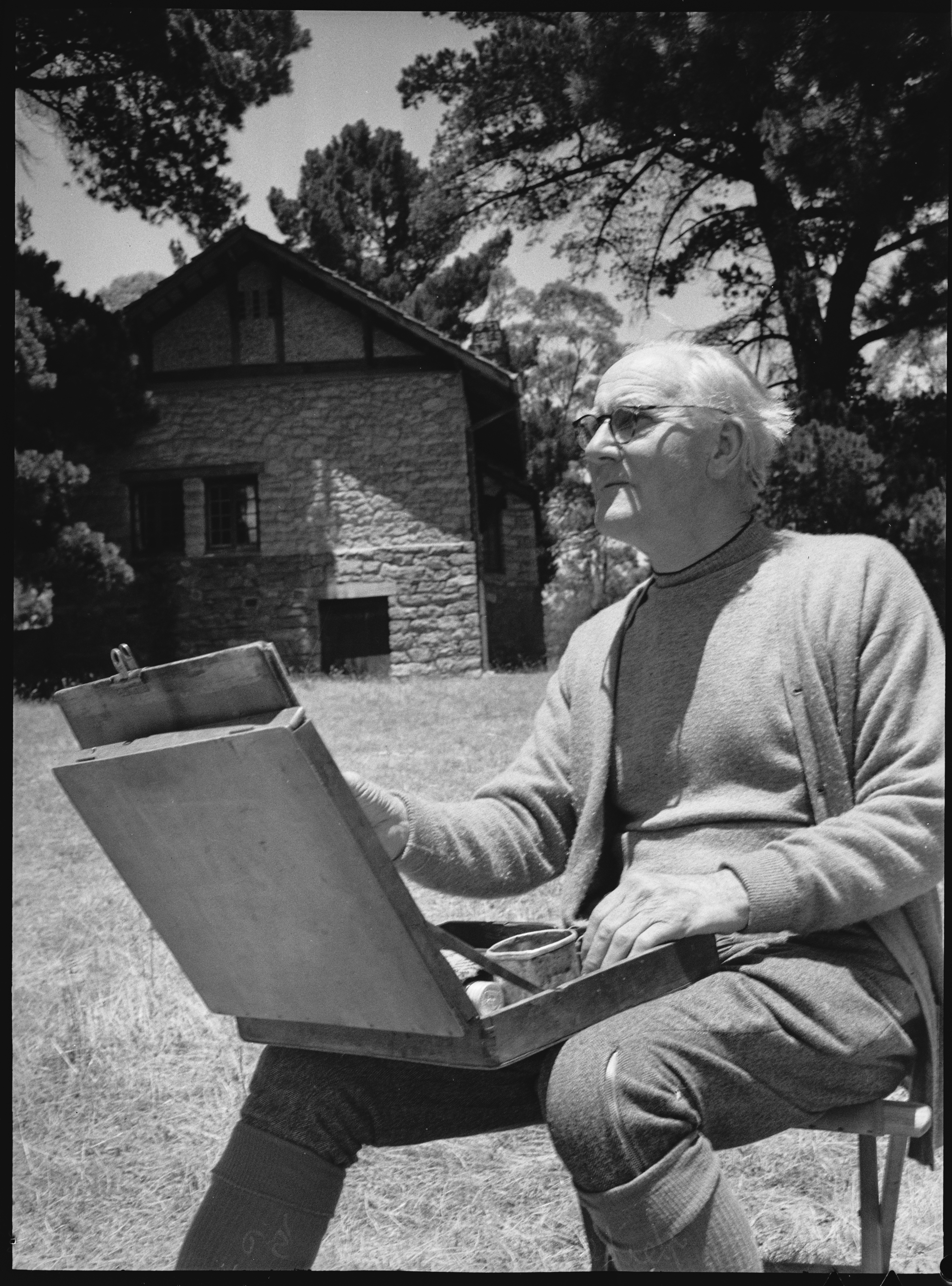
Heysen outside of his studio in Hahndorf, 1950

The content of all of Hans Heysen's art and certainly to a great extent Droving Into the Light concerns itself largely with the Australian identity and pride of the Australian nation. A German born artist, Heysen moved with his family to Australia in July 1884, aged only six. He came to fall in love with his new home of South Australia, its nature and lifestyle, which defined the majority of his life, playing a major role in his artistic inspiration.

Due to the pride Heysen held for his nation of Australia, it is known that he channelled this passion into his painting, and this is evident within Droving Into the Light through the statement it makes about Australia and the shaping of its history. His use of nationalistic symbols and motifs such as the drover and the river red gum trees works to create a perennial representation of Federation Australia. Composed in a period which defined the Australian identity, mainly due to the events of World War I, Droving Into the Light is considered as a symbol of Australia's Federation period.

Hans Heysen’s landscapes were ground breaking in their time and helped the way we view the Australian landscape. Heysen made the monumental gum tree a hero of his nationalistic Federation-period pieces

— Ron Radford, Director of the National Gallery of Australia,

Droving Into the Light has influenced the works of other Australian artists and writers, including Kim Scott and his ekphrasis of the painting in his short story Into the Light. The symbolic use of light within the painting serves as the inspiration for Scott's story, also set in a grand Australian landscape. Nathanael Pree's analysis of the painting's details for the purpose of studying Scott's ekphrasis further expose the meaningful contrasts within Droving Into the Light that represent the condition of life in young federation Australia; the faceless man hunched over the horse, the black dog that follows, elements which "inform the work as much as the promised light ahead."

Thus, the painting can be considered symbolic of a journey, the journey on which Australians found themselves on in discovering their national identity, and one which inspired such works as that of Kim Scott, proving its significance to Australian history.

== Conception ==
The painting's development over seven years from 1914 to 1921 can be largely attributed to the disruptions of World War I, which Heysen described as "madness" and "a stupid and terrible thing,". This caused Heysen considerable depression and confusion especially due to his birthplace in Germany, considered by Australians at the time as the antagonist. The attitude of the time caused hateful judgments within people and thus created tension between Heysen and his community, causing him to connect on a deeper emotional level with his passion for art, and was likely a reason he took pride in compositions which represented the grand landscapes of Australia, the country he was always grateful to live in.

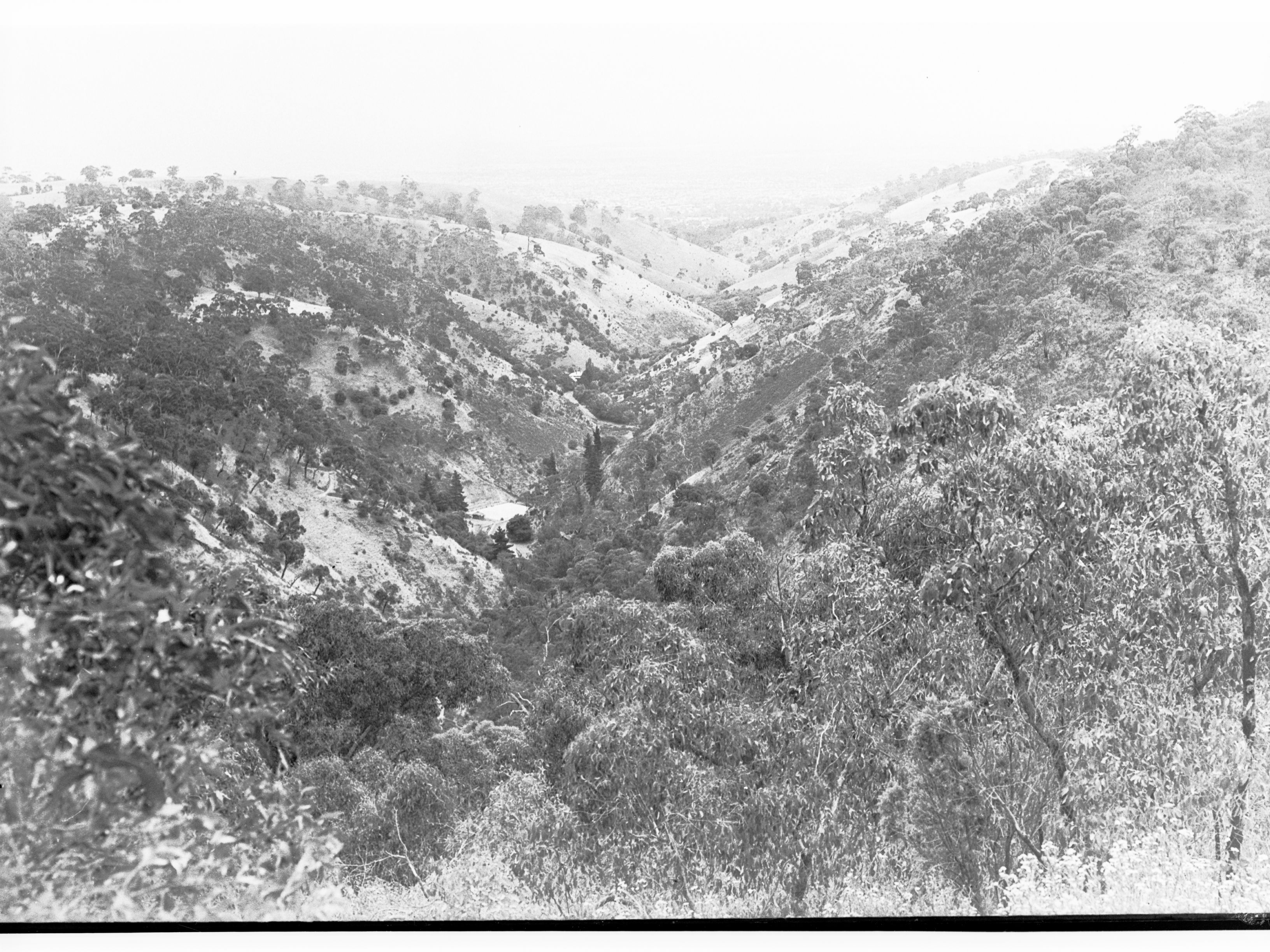
Landscape of the Adelaide Hills which inspired Heysen's work

As time passed, this period only grew Heysen's artistic maturity and caused him to add the aforementioned changes of the river red gum. During these tumultuous years, his passion for painting the Australian landscape only grew and confirmed his identity as strictly Australian, notably eschewing the use of blues and greens that were associated with his European counterparts and focusing more on the warm colours that are present in Droving Into the Light. Heysen used the Australian outback and the scenes of grand nature near his residence as an escape from the hardships caused by the time, immersing himself in his paintings to distract himself from the threats posed by the war. It is for this reason that it is said Heysen's paintings, particularly Droving into the Light, with its intense focus on light interacting with a captivating Australian landscape, create an emotional response within viewers that perfectly mimics the feelings of facing Australia's landscapes. This aligns with Heysen's attitude towards his compositions and art in general, one which permeates Droving into the Light and the rest of his paintings:

I am only trying to paint as truthfully as I can and that which my eyes see and perhaps what I unconsciously feel. Truth to nature after all is the goal but truth interpreted through temperament – it all seems to become more precious and beautiful the older one grows – and more wonderful. We are given all these marvellous gifts and yet what proportion of mankind really understands and appreciates that which we can have for nothing.

— Hans Heysen,
