= Monument to the Heroes of the Black Army =

- Monument aux héros de l'Armée noire
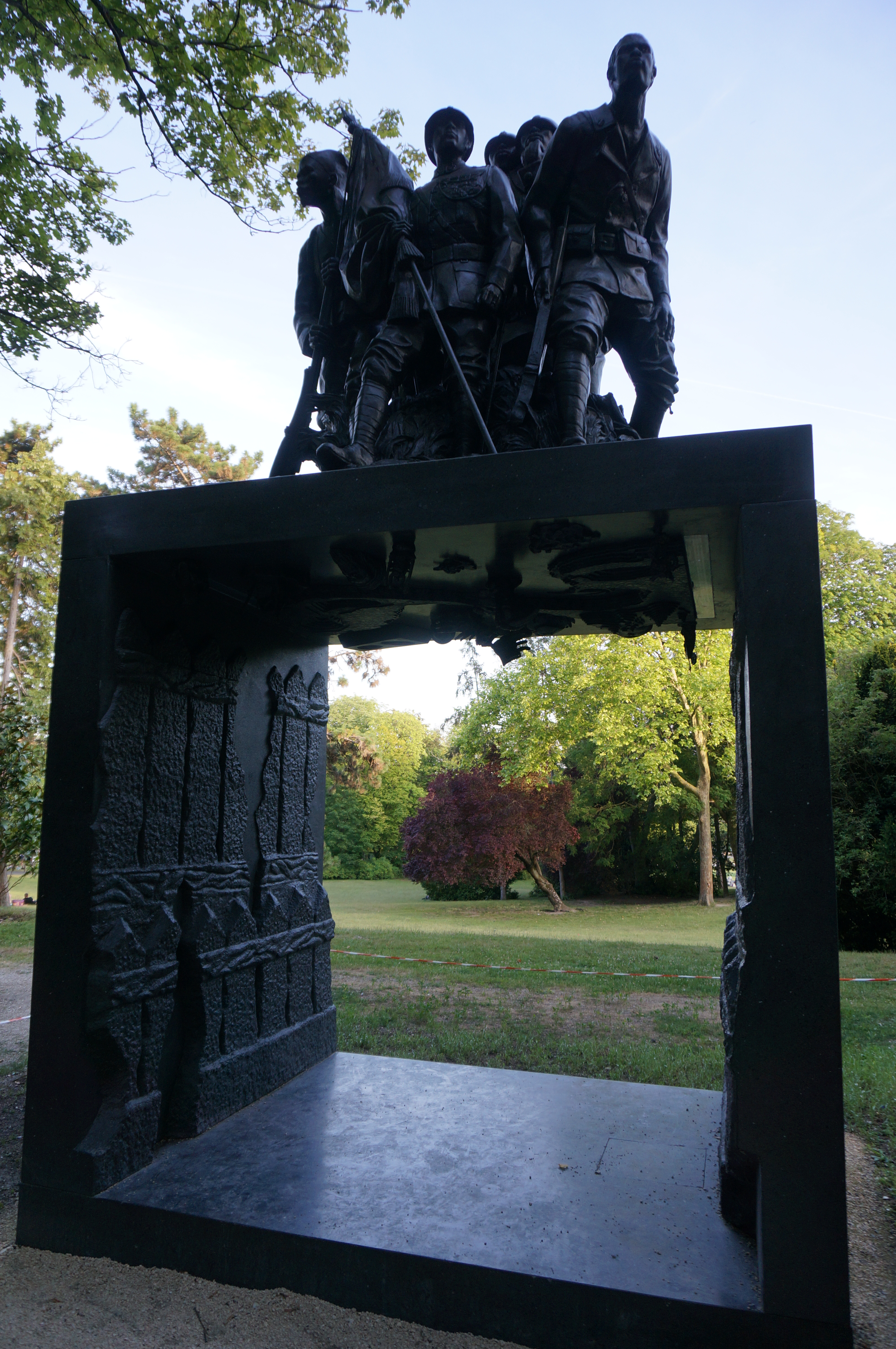
- Interactive map of Monument to the Heroes of the Black Army
- Location: Place de la Liberté, Bamako, Mali, and Parc de Champagne, Reims, France
- Coordinates: 12°38′47″N 8°00′04″W and 49°14′24″N 4°03′27″E
- Designer: Paul Moreau-Vauthier (statue), Auguste Bluysen (base in Bamako), Jean-François Gavoty (base in Reims)

Monument to the Heroes of the Black Army (French: Monument aux héros de l'Armée noire) is the name of a war memorial on Place de la Liberté, Bamako, Mali, and its replica, with a different base, located in Parc de Champagne in Reims, France, commemorating the role of African soldiers in the defense of the city in the summer of 1918. The memorial in Bamako was inaugurated in January 1924, and the original replica in Reims in July of the same year.

== History ==
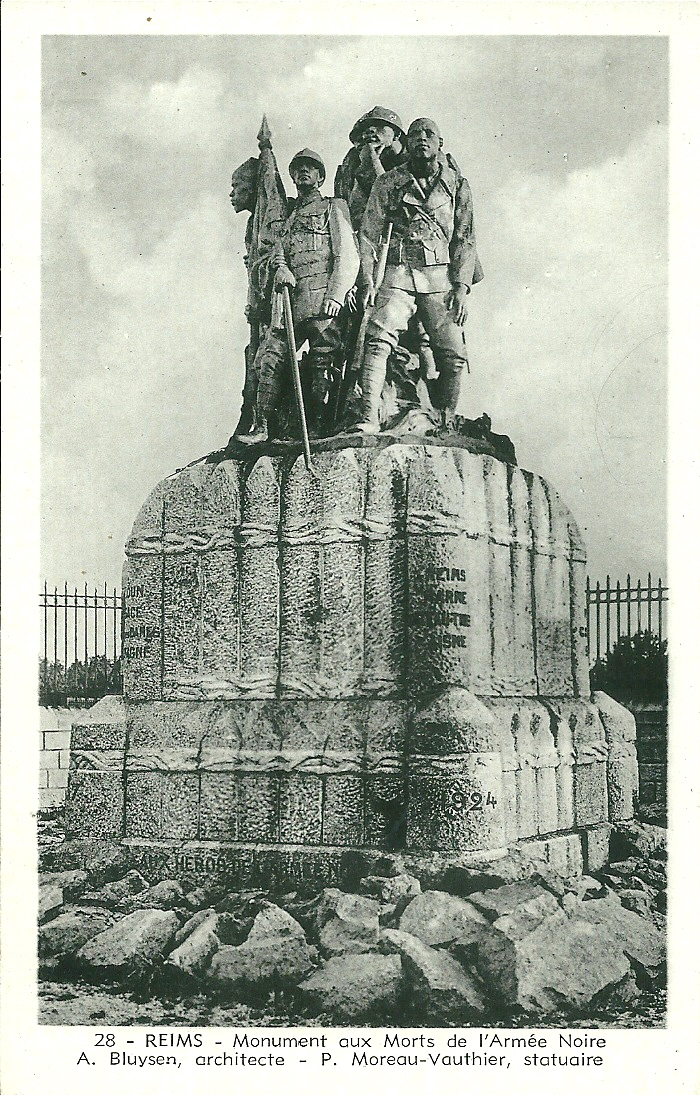
The original replica in Reims

The original replica of the Monument in Reims was erected in 1924 where the Boulevard Henry Vasnier meets the Avenue du Général Giraud. The first stone was placed by Minister of War André Maginot, on 29 October 1922. This ceremony was also addressed by Blaise Diagne, the Senegalese political leader. In July 1924 the monument was inaugurated with a Military and Sports fete presided over by Minister of the Colonies Édouard Daladier. General Louis Archinard was the president of the committee that supervised the erection of the monument, highlighting the role of African troops of the 1st Colonial Infantry Corps in the defense of Reims from the German Army in 1918. They were particularly renowned for their tenacious defence of Fort de la Pompelle. 10,000 people attended the fete which was held immediately following the inauguration. The original monument, consisting of five figures, was a replica of a similar monument erected in Bamako, Mali in January 1924. The monument was dismantled during the German occupation in September 1940. In September 1958, on the occasion of the fortieth anniversary of the Defence of Reims, a new monument was started. This was completed in time for a second inauguration ceremony on 6 October 1963, with Pierre Messmer, Minister of Armies, Jean Sainteny, Minister of veterans, Jacques Foccart, secretary general of the Communauté et les affaires africaines et malgaches, and General Georges Catroux, grand chancellor of the Légion d'honneur. In 2008, on the occasion of the ninetieth anniversary of the defence of Reims, a major ceremony was held in remembrance of the Black Army of Reims, attended by Jean-Marie Bockel, Rama Yade and Adeline Hazan.
