= Model by the Wicker Chair =

Painting by Edvard Munch (c. 1920)

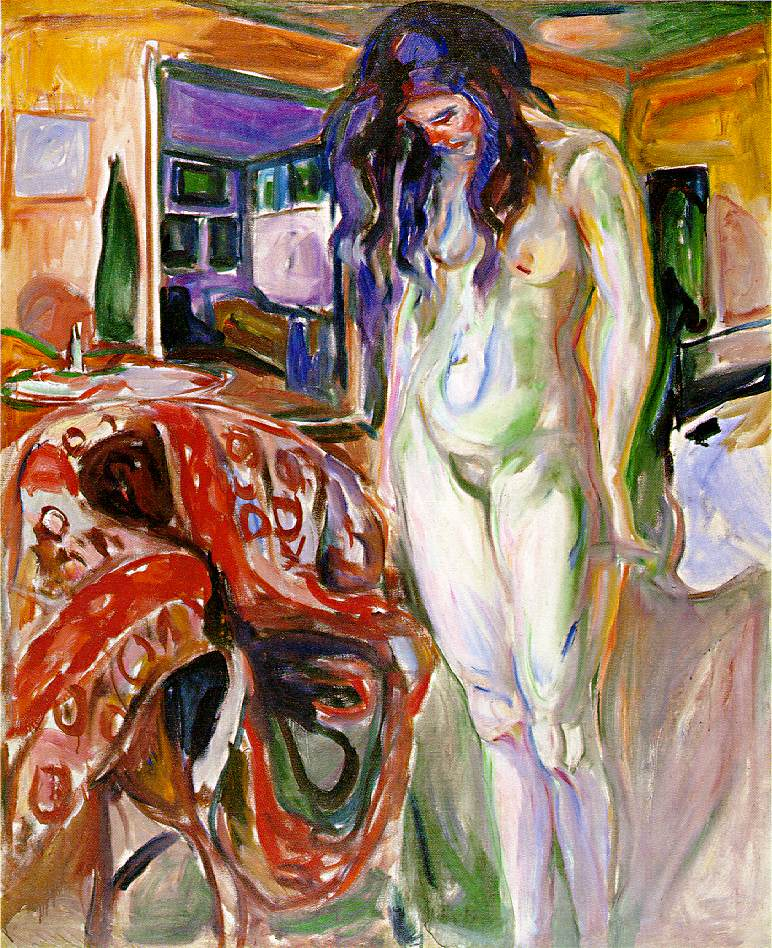
- Artist: Edvard Munch
- Year: 1919-1921
- Medium: Oil on canvas
- Dimensions: 122.5 cm × 100 cm (48.2 in × 39 in)
- Location: Munch Museum; Oslo

Model by the Wicker Chair is an oil on canvas painting by the Norwegian artist Edvard Munch, from 1919-1921. It is held in the Munch Museum, in Oslo.

== Description ==
The painting depicts a naked female art model standing next to a wicker chair, covered with a colorful fabric with dominant reds, which she is looking at.

== Exhibitions ==
The painting was on display in New York City at the Museum of Modern Art as part of its "Edvard Munch: The Modern Life of the Soul" exhibition, which opened on February 19, 2006 and ran through May 8, 2006.

The painting was on display in Madrid, Spain at the Thyssen-Bornemisza Museum as part of its "Edvard Munch: Archetypes" exhibition, which opened on October 6, 2015 and ran through January 17, 2016.

The painting was on display in New York City at the Neue Galerie as part of its "Munch and Expressionism" exhibition, which opened on February 18, 2016 and ran through June 13, 2016. It was 1 of only 19 ‘Oil on canvas’ works by Munch chosen to be a part of this exhibition, as selected by curator Jill Lloyd together with art historian Reinhold Heller.

== See also ==
- List of paintings by Edvard Munch
