= Richard Jeranian =

Armenian painter (1921–2019)

Richard Jerenian
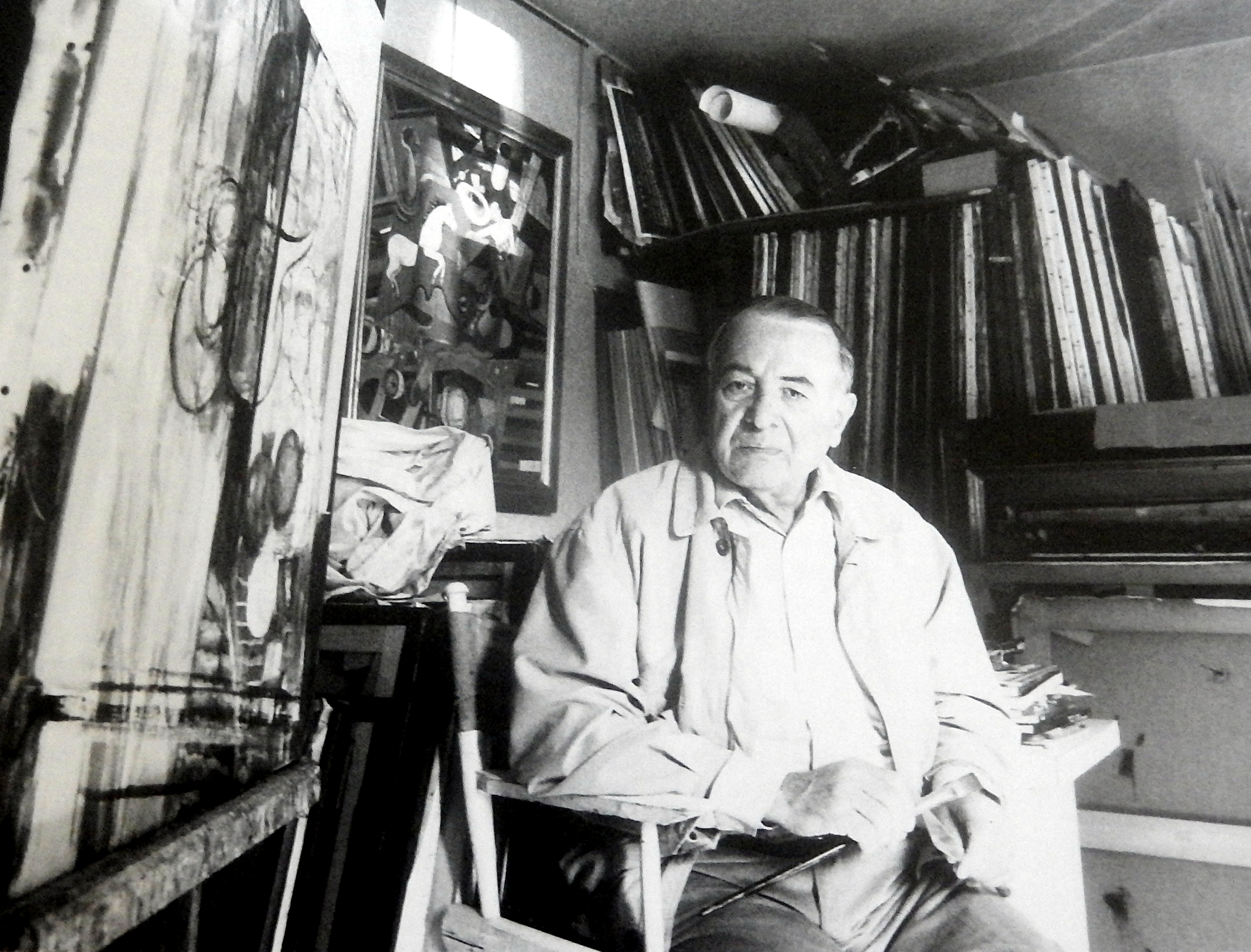
- Born: 17 July 1921; Sebaste (now Sivas), Ottoman Empire
- Died: 10 October 2019 (aged 98)
- Education: Académie Julian
- Known for: Painting
- Awards: Khorenatsi medal (2011); Order of Arts and Letters (1959)

Richard Jeranian (Armenian: Ռիշար Ժերանյան; 17 July 1921 – 10 October 2019) was an Armenian painter, draftsman and lithographer active in France.

== Biography ==
In the 1930s, when Armenia belonged to the Transcaucasian Socialist Federative Soviet Republic, Richard Jeranian went into exile in France. Interested in art and music, he began his studies in Marseille where the landscapes of Provence inspired him, he pursued his studies in Paris at the Académie Julian and at the Académie de la Grande Chaumière. In 1944 he was called to serve in the air force and was sent to Algiers, then to Fez where he remained until 1946.

After the war, being closely connected with artists from the Armenian diaspora, he traveled and exhibited in Lebanon, Soviet Russia and Iran, he also visited his native land in connection with the Calouste Gulbenkian Foundation efforts in support of Armenia. During the 1998 earthquake, he participated with other artists in donations for the creation of a children hospital after the disaster.

The style of his works evolved, going through figurative, surrealist, cubist or abstract periods covering the themes of music, woman and Armenia through figures, landscapes, genre scenes or still lifes in oil and ink. He died in October 2019 at the age of 98.

== Collections ==
- Pushkin Museum of Fine Arts, Moscow.
- National Gallery of Armenia

== Awards ==
- Silver medal of the city of Paris, 1955
- Ordre des Arts et des Lettres, 1959
- Martiros Sarian National Prize for Painting, 1987
- Khorenatsi medal Cultural Prize of Armenia, 2011

== Bibliography ==
- Richard Jeranian [Texte imprimé] : 60 ans de peinture évolutive Paris cop. 2006
