= Movses Khorenatsi Medal =

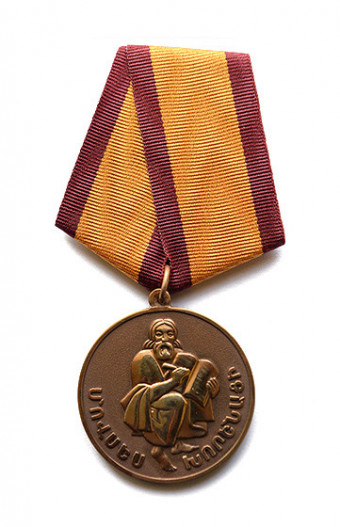

Awarded by Armenia
- Type: Medal of cultural merit
- Established: 26 July 1993
- Country: Armenia
- Eligibility: Military and civilians
- Awarded for: Significant contribution to the advancement of Armenian culture

Precedence
- Next (higher): Anania Shirakatsi Medal
- Next (lower): Medal for Excellent Maintenance of Public Order
- Ribbon

The Movses Khorenatsi Medal (Armenian: Մովսես Խորենացու մեդալ) is Armenia's highest cultural award. It is presented by the president of Armenia to people who have significantly contributed to the advancement of Armenian culture. Artist Richard Jeranian received the medal in 2011 and pianist Şahan Arzruni received it in 2015.

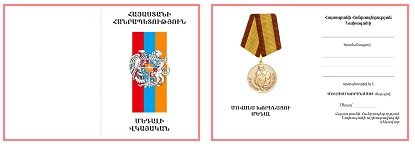
Award certificate
