= Johann Friedrich Engel =

German painter (b. 1844, d. 1921)

- Born: April 24, 1844; Germany
- Died: March 2, 1921 (aged 76); Munich, Germany
- Education: Academy of Arts in Düsseldorf, Royal Academy of Arts in Munich

Johann Friedrich Engel (also known as John Fred Engel; April 24, 1844 – March 2, 1921) was a German painter and illustrator. He lived for a time in the United States.

== Early life ==
At age eight, Engel moved to the United States with his parents. They settled in Albany, New York. Engel studied under Belgian painter François Unterricht. He returned to Germany in 1861 and joined the Academy of Arts in Düsseldorf. On January 18, 1862, he joined the Royal Academy of Arts in Munich. After graduating in 1868, he returned to the United States. In 1873, he returned to Germany and settled in Munich, where he died on March 2, 1921.

== Career ==
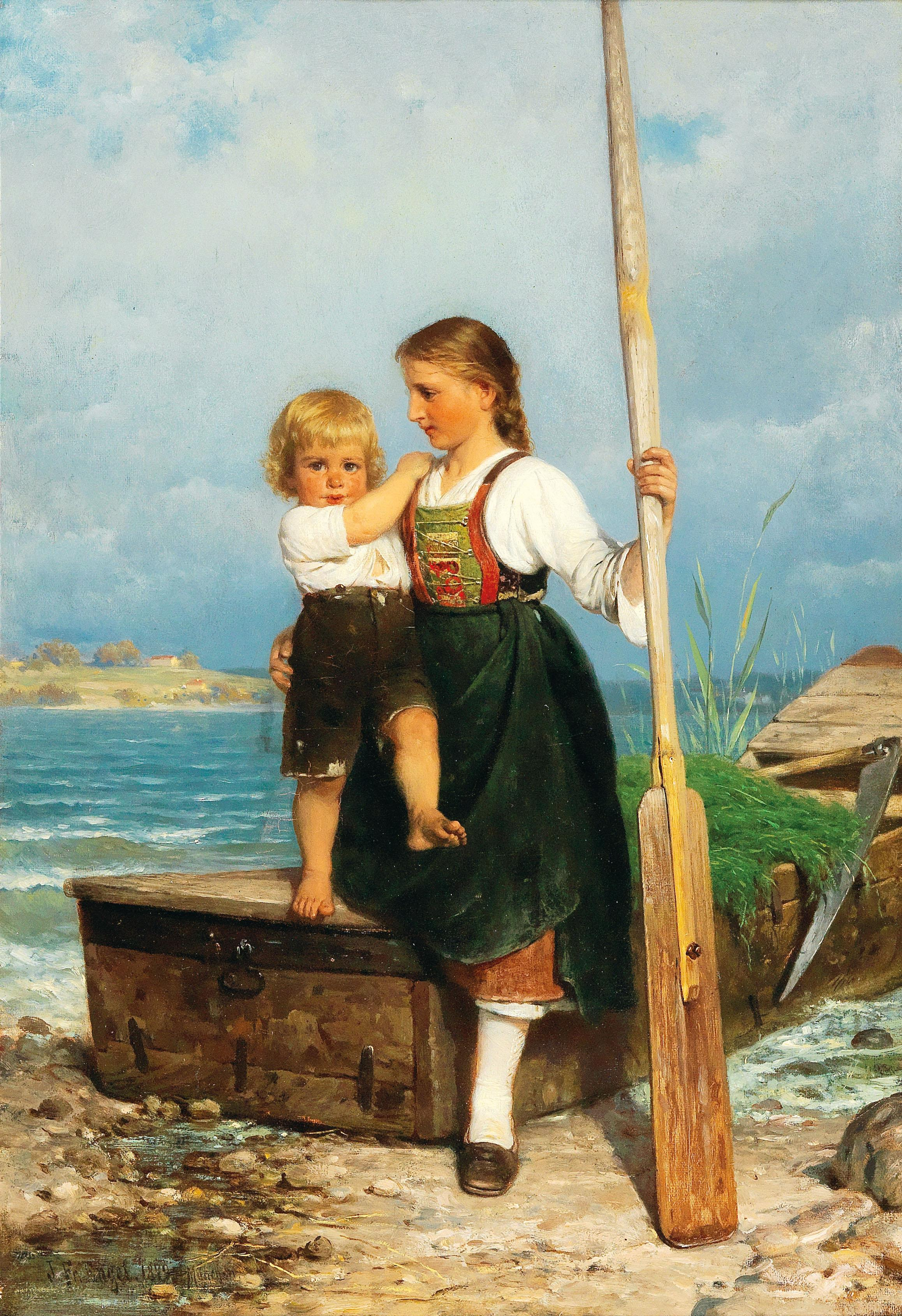
Fisherwoman on Chiemsee, 1879

Engel was a portraitist and painter of genre scenes. His work includes portraits of children in traditional Bavarian costumes or scenes set in the Upper Bavarian area of Chiemgau, such as Fisherwoman on Chiemsee (1879) or Return from Fishing. Engel's family served as an inspiration to him, with his grandson Hugo modeling for at least one piece. His later work includes genre scenes, most notably paintings like Congratulation, Our Grandma, Guests by the Wall, Merry Loneliness (1898) and The Secret (1901). In 1910, he created three frames with allegorical representations of the seasons of the year. Most of his work is in private collections.
