= Paul Moreau-Vauthier =

French sculptor (1871–1936)

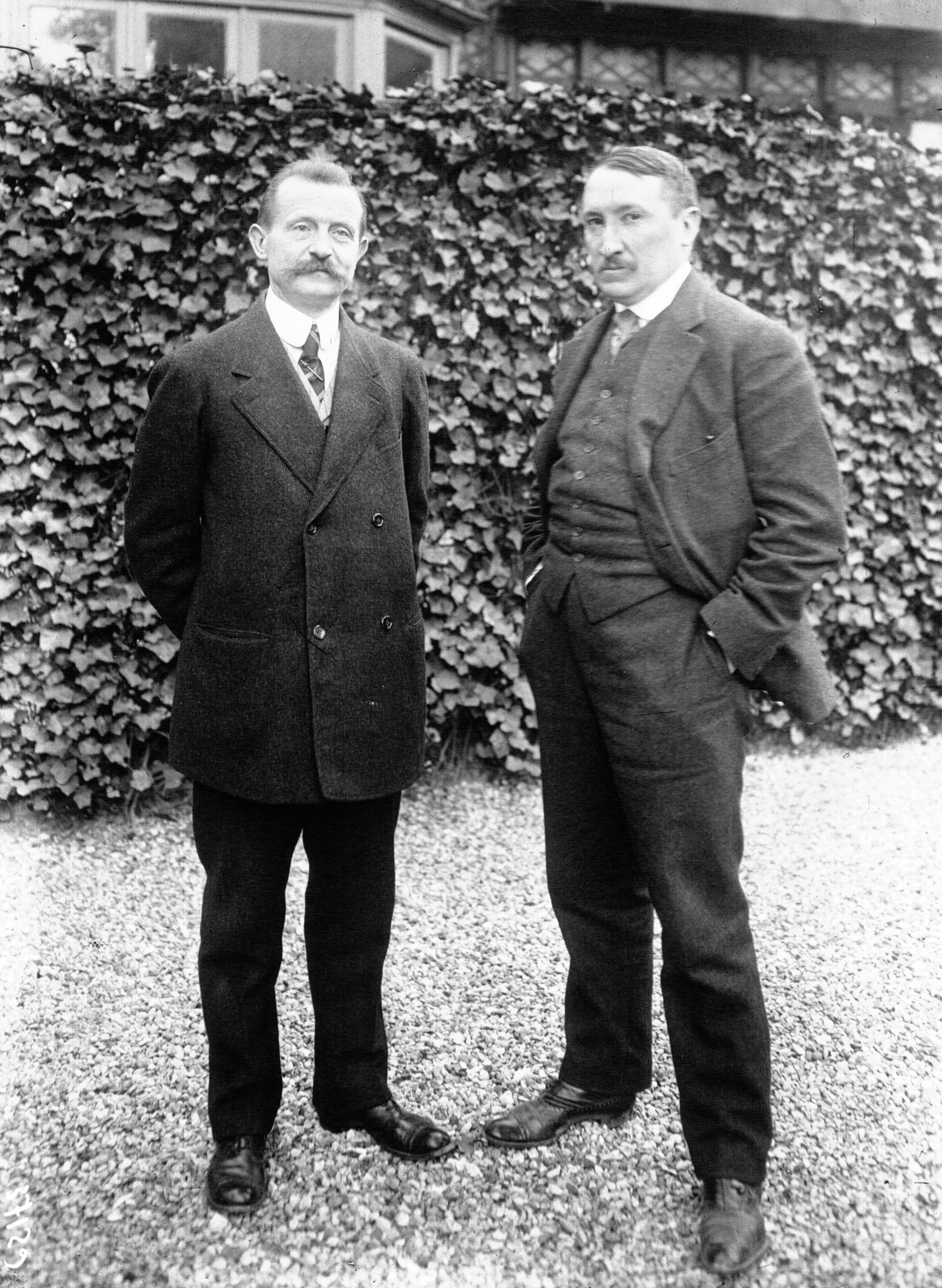
Paul Moreau-Vauthier and Théodore Vienne (left) in 1913

Paul Moreau-Vauthier (26 November 1871 – 2 February 1936) was a French sculptor.

Moreau-Vauthier first achieved public renown with his statue La Parisienne shown at the Exposition Universelle (1900) in Paris, and is now perhaps best known for his memorial wall to the Victimes des révolutions (Mur des Fédérés) on Avenue Gambetta, Paris. He also created an allegorical work to commemorate Louis Blériot's first cross-Channel airplane flight in 1909. His work was also part of the art competitions at the 1928 Summer Olympics and the 1932 Summer Olympics.

A veteran of the Battle of Verdun, Moreau-Vauthier had the idea in 1920 to memorialize World War I by installing a series of sculpted stones along the 650 km front from Nieuwpoort, Belgium through Moosch near Altkirch, and on to the Franco-Swiss border. He presented his first model that year in Paris; Henri Defert, president of the Touring Club of France, endorsed the idea and invited the Belgian Touring Club to join the project. A total of 240 markers were planned (28 in Belgium, 212 in France), of which 118 were erected (22 in Belgium, 96 in France) in the years between 1921 and 1927. Three basic designs differ primarily in the helmet capping the milestone (French, Belgium, British), with side decorations of infantryman's gear such as water bottles, hand grenades, etc.

Moreau-Vauthier died in 1936 in a car accident at Ruffigny near Niort in Deux-Sèvres, and is buried in Père Lachaise Cemetery in Paris.

== Selected works ==
- La Parisienne, Paris, Exposition Universelle (1900)
- Victimes des révolutions, Avenue Gambetta, Paris; designed 1900, built 1909
- Borne du Front, many locations; between 1921–1927
- The Monument to the heroes of the armée noire commemorating those black soldiers from Africa who had served France in the Great War- “ Aux héros de l’Armée noire”. Two identical bronze statues were made. One was erected in Bamako in Mali in what was then the French Sudan but is now Mali and the other in Reims chosen especially as Senegalese troops had played a major role in her defense from May to July 1918. Moreau-Vauthier’s work involved four black soldiers grouped around a white officer, all defending the national flag. The bronze sculpture stood on a granite pedestal and on the four sides of this pedestal the names were inscribed of those battles in which black troops had fought-YSER/ARRAS/DARDANELLES/SOMME/VERDUN/ALSACE/CHEMIN DES DAMES/CHAMPAGNE/REIMS/CHATEAU-THIERRY/AISNE/ORIENT/MAROC/CAMEROUN-TOGO. The Reims monument was destroyed by the Germans during their occupation of Reims during the 1939-1945 war; its sentiments in honouring Africans being anathema to the Nazi code. The monument carried the inscription « Aux héros de l’Armée noire » : « en témoignage de reconnaissance envers les Enfants d’adoption de la France, morts en combattant pour la Liberté et la Civilisation » The monument in Reims was replaced after the Second World War and a new memorial can now be seen.
Selected works

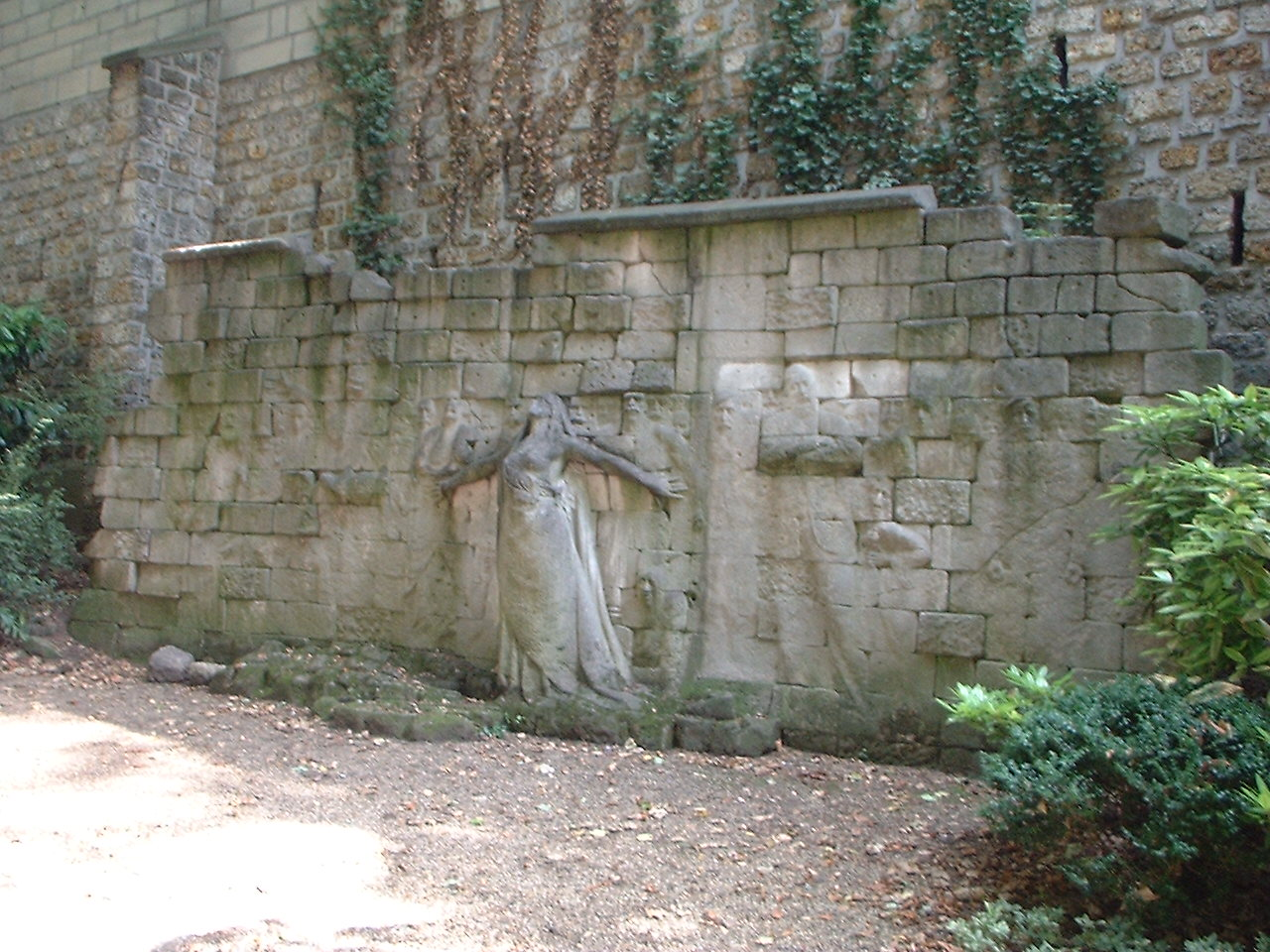
Victimes des révolutions, by Paul Moreau-Vauthier

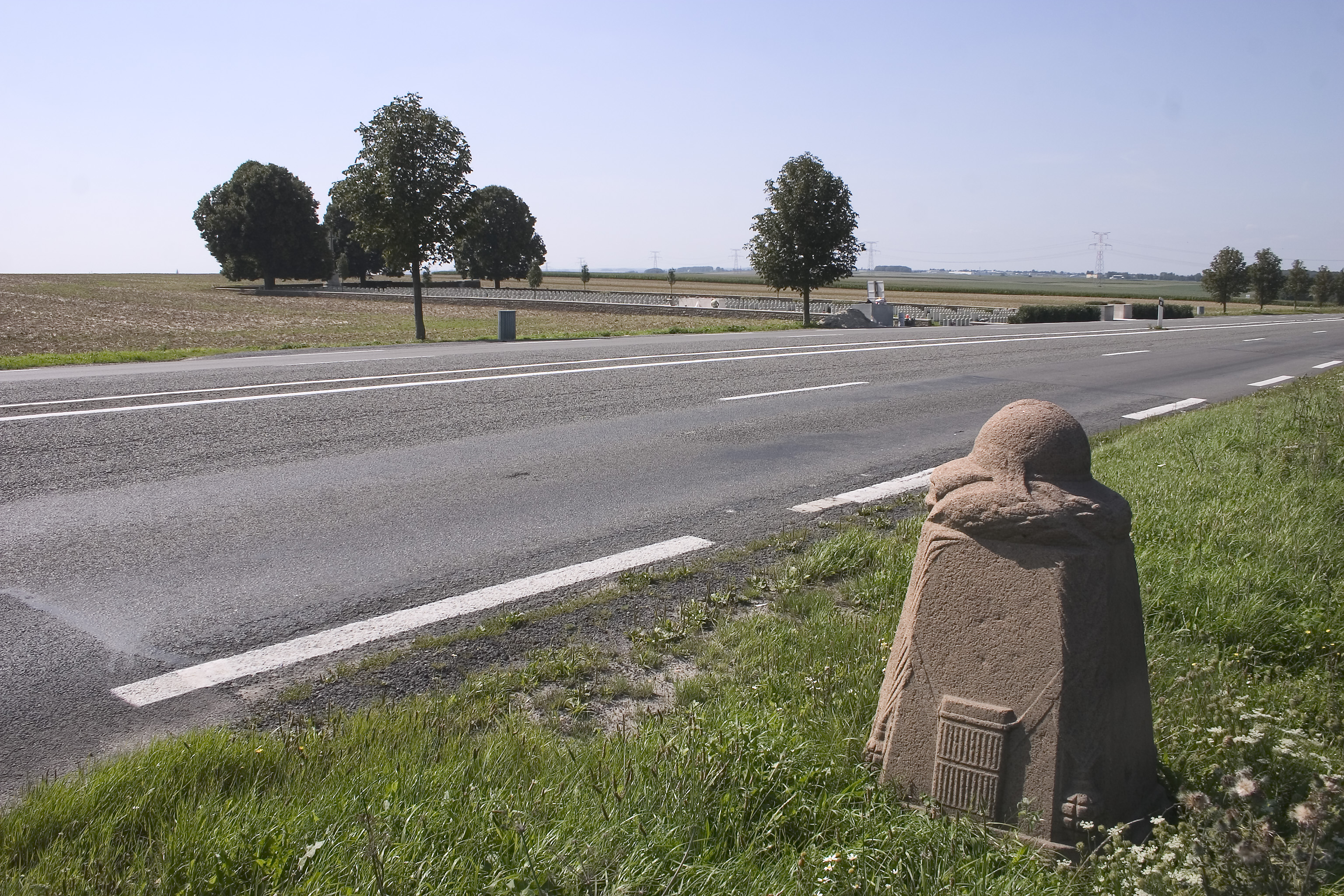
One of the Western Front demarcation stones

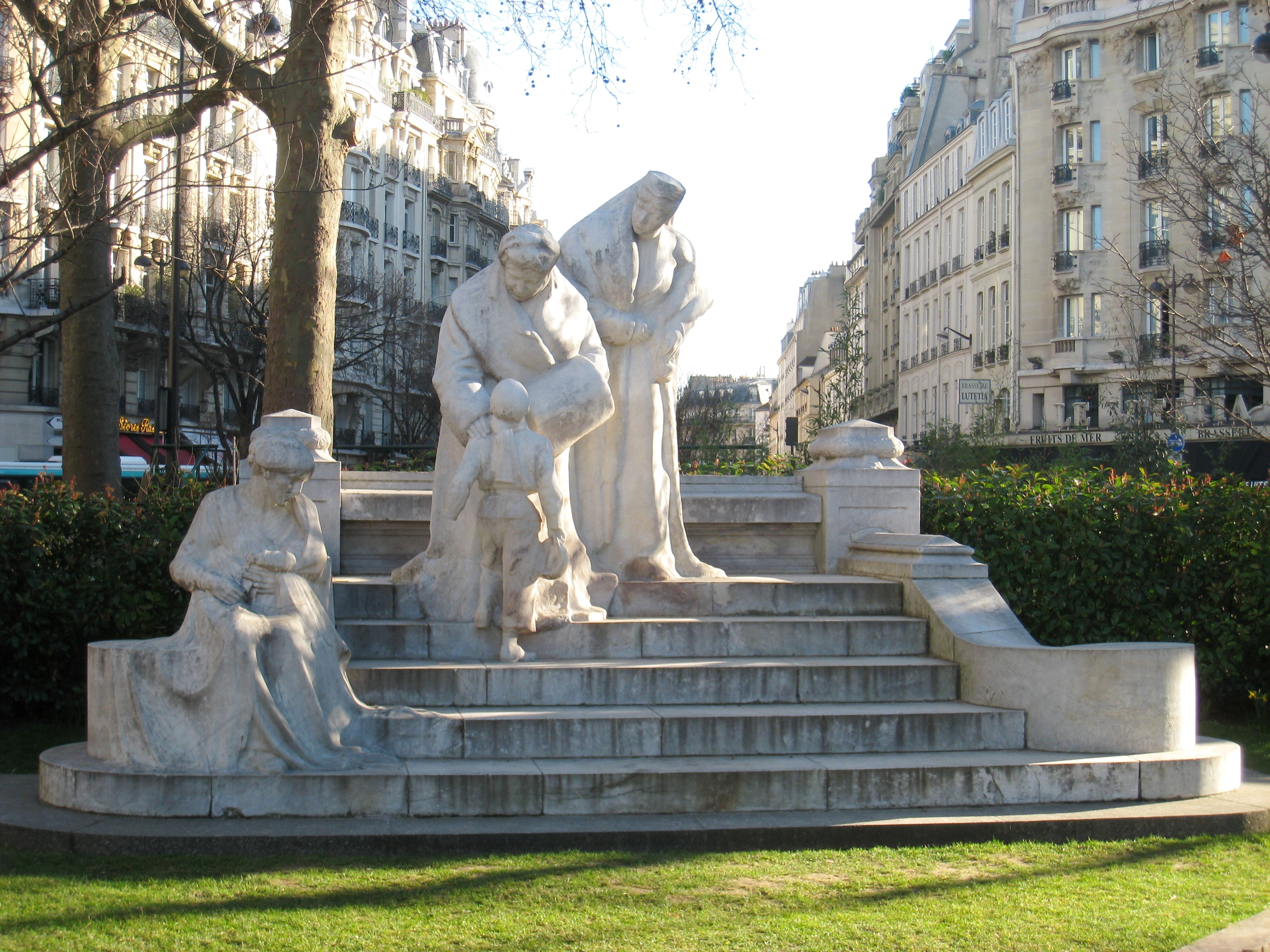
Memorial to Mme. Marguerite Boucicaut and Baroness Clara de Hirsh, honoring their charitable work, in the Square Boucicaut in Paris

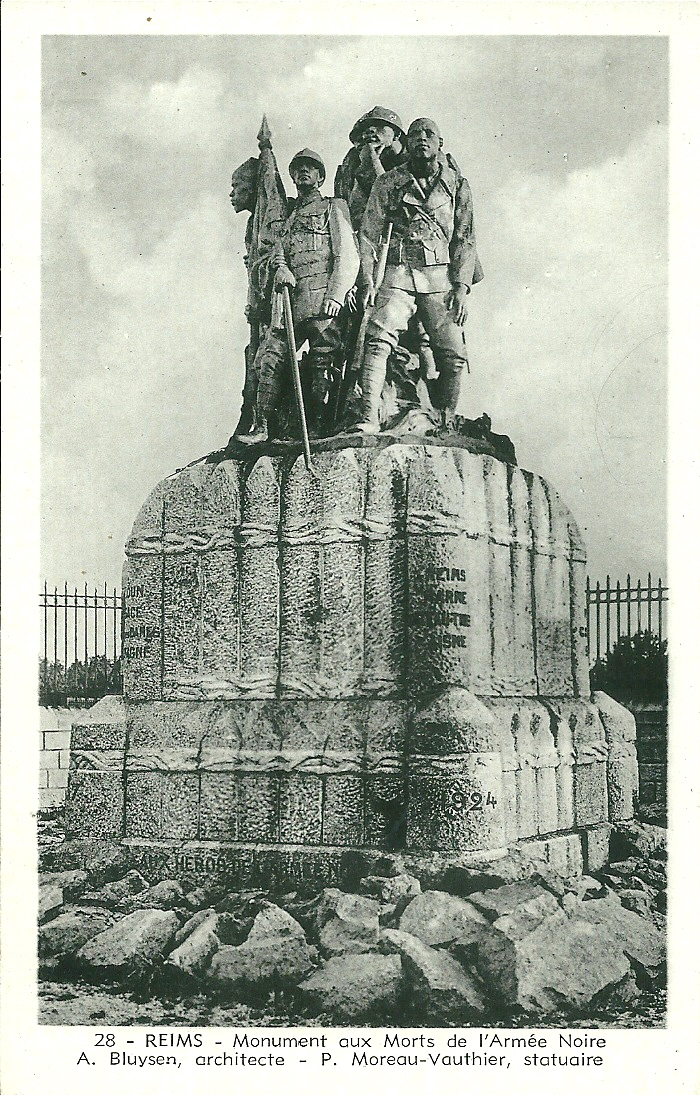
Monument in Reims to the Senegalese soldiers of the French Army, erected in 1924, destroyed in September 1940
