= Reading the Letter =

Painting by Pablo Picasso

Reading The Letter (1921)
- Artist: Pablo Picasso
- Year: 1921
- Medium: Oil on canvas
- Dimensions: 184 cm × 105 cm (72.4 in × 41.3 in)
- Location: Musée Picasso

La Lecture de la Lettre (English: Reading the Letter) is an oil on canvas painting by Pablo Picasso, which he painted c. 1921, during his transition from Cubism to Neoclassicism, very close to the time of the birth of his son, Paulo. The painting depicts two well-dressed boys reading a letter. The boys have downcast expressions as they read. One boy has an oversized hand on the other's shoulder.

== Description ==
The painting depicts two male figures who are dressed in city clothing. They sit side by side with a familiar attitude and can be seen reading a letter together. One of the figures has placed his arm across the shoulder of the other and this proximity suggests a close relationship between the two. This portrayal has drawn connections with Picasso's own friendship with the writer Guillaume Apollinaire who died in 1918 and may therefore be considered a posthumous tribute by Picasso.

== Ownership history ==
According to the Picasso Museum in Paris, the painting was discovered during the inventory of his studios after his death. It had previously been unknown. It was given as part of the estate to the French nation, which placed it in the care of the Picasso Museum.

== Style and controversy ==
Picasso is not known to have commented on this work, and the precise date may be in question. Many features in the painting including facial features and hands resemble those in La Danse Villageoise (1921), Mere et Enfant (spring 1921), and Tete et Main de Femme (1921). The meaning of the painting is not the same to all viewers; one reviewer in the New York Times described it as "social realism". Pierre Daix uses the term "hemstitched eyes" to describe that feature in this and related works of the period. The Picasso Museum (p. 23) and others believe the painting a tribute to Apollinaire, a friend of Picasso who had died recently. Picasso was criticized by cubist artists for his return to classicism and for mixing classicism and cubism. One modern critic, writing in the Guardian, described the painting as "homoerotic" and "an overwhelming monument to intimacy." Despite any criticism, Arianna Huffington notes (p. 172) that Picasso was enjoying phenomenal financial success at this time, estimating his own earnings at one and a half million francs per year.

== Footnotes ==
- Daix, Pierre. Picasso: Life and Art. New York: Harper-Collins, 1987. pp. 175–178.
- Huffington, Arianna S. Picasso: Creator and Destroyer. New York: Simon and Schuster. 1988.
- Jones, Jonathan. "When the master of peace did violence". The Guardian, 25 Oct 2003, as archived at Yurica Report. Accessed 6 Aug 2007. The Picasso Museum, Paris.
- Besnard-Bernadac, Marie-Laure, et al. New York: Abrams. 1986. P.23, pp. 56–58.
- Russell, John. "Art View: Once fit for a King, and now fit for Picasso". New York Times, 13 Oct 1985. P. 2. Accessed 5 Aug 2007.
