= Western Front demarcation stones =

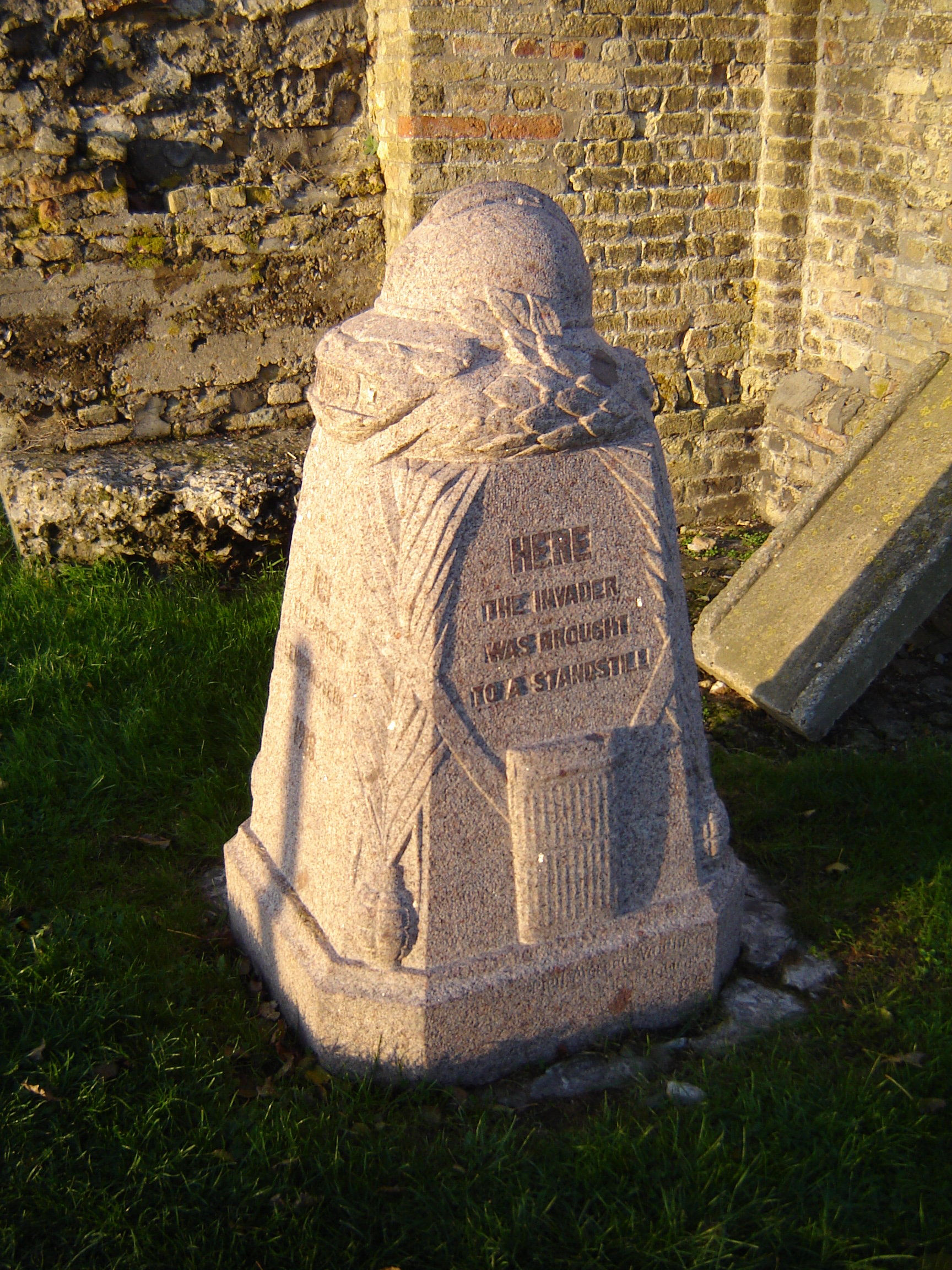
Side view of a Belgian Army-style demarcation stone in Stuivekenskerke

Western Front demarcation stones, known in French as bornes du Front (Front bollards or markers) or bornes Vauthier (Vauthier bollards or markers) and in Dutch as demarcatiepalen (demarcation posts), are monuments erected in France and Belgium to mark the limit of the German advance during the First World War. The stones were the idea of sculptor Paul Moreau-Vauthier, a veteran of the war, and were erected between 1921 and 1930. The total number of stones erected is unclear but it is thought that there were 118 official stones, of which 93 survive. The stones identify the army (Belgian, British or French) that held that sector in 1918 and are engraved with the text "Here the invader was brought to a standstill 1918" in English, Dutch, and French.

== History ==
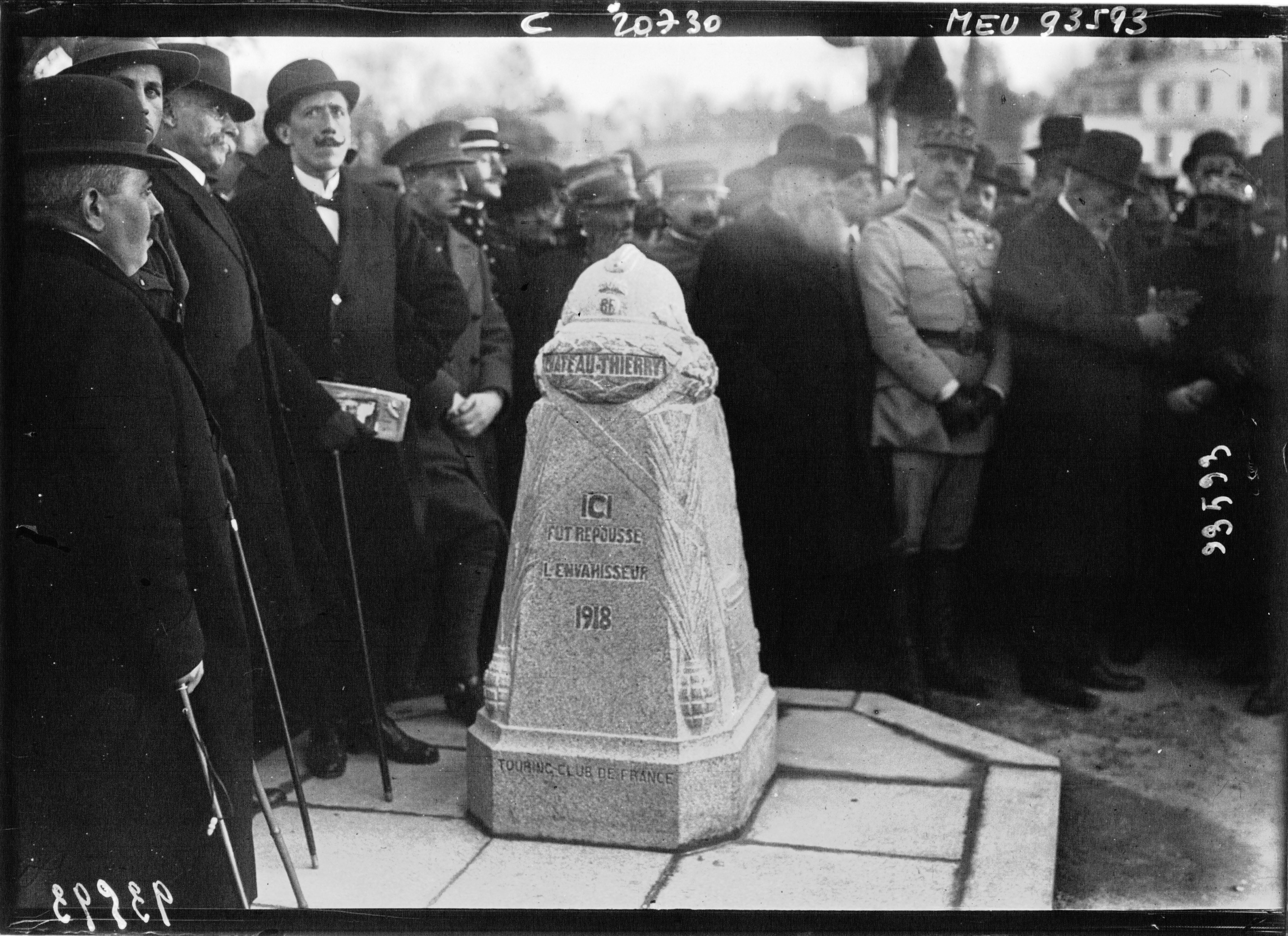
Inauguration of the stone at Château-Thierry, 10 November 1921

The stones mark the line of the Western Front in 1918 at the start of the Allied Hundred Days Offensive, and thus mark the limit of the German advance into French and Belgian territory. The idea came from sculptor Paul Moreau-Vauthier who had served as a machine gunner in the French Army during the war and had been severely wounded at the Battle of Verdun. Vauthier presented the idea at the Salon des Artistes Decorateurs in 1919. The idea received the support of the Touring club de France and the Touring Club Belgium who arranged public subscriptions. The original intention had been to erect a monument at every kilometre along the 960-kilometre-long (600 mi) Front but this was later scaled back. Sources vary on the number erected, giving a range of 119 to 280 stones, but it is thought that 119 were erected, of which 118 were official stones placed on the frontline between 1921 and 1930, 22 in Belgium and 96 in France.

The stones were placed at locations selected by Marshal Petain and his staff and often occupy prominent positions such as roadsides. They run from the North Sea coast of Belgium to the Vosges region of France. There are some anomalies such as the stone at Villers-Bretonneux which lies to the east of the town. The town was actually occupied by the Germans during the 1918 Second Battle of Villers-Bretonneux but because the occupation was brief, a mere 24 hours, it was not considered when the stone was sited. Similarly, a stone in the Somme region near Hébuterne is positioned some 1.2 kilometres (3/4 mi) east of the actual limit of the German advance.

== Description ==
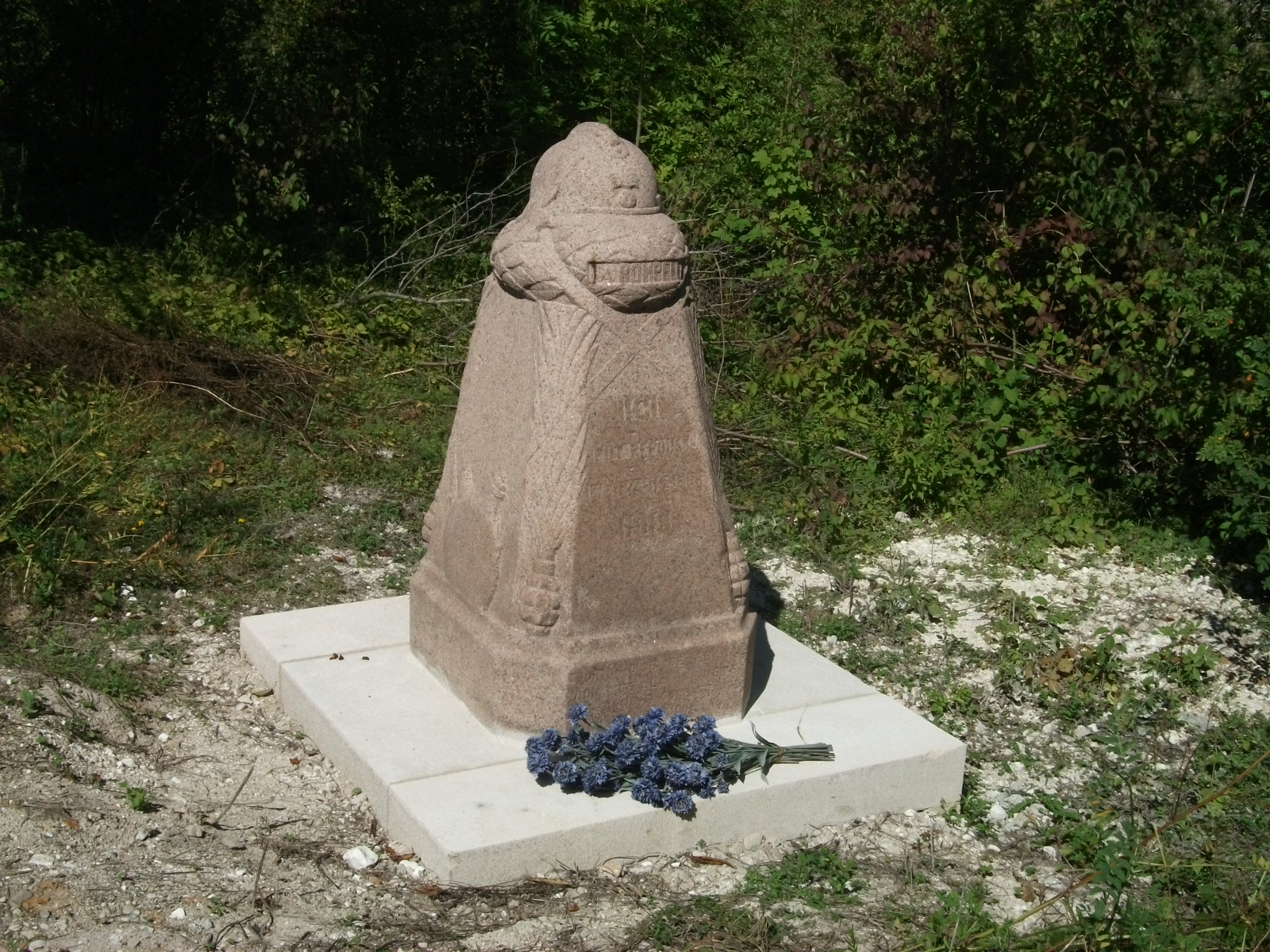
Front view of a French Army-style demarcation stone at the Fort de la Pompelle

The monuments were carved by stonemason Léon Telle from Alsace pink granite. They are 1 metre (3 ft 3 in) high and square in section. The top of the stone is carved with the helmet of the army that held that section of the line in 1918, with appropriate identifying badges. Thus, for Belgian and French sectors an Adrian helmet is depicted, and for the British sector a Brodie helmet is used, in each case set upon a laurel wreath. The front of the stone shows the name of the locality, the sides depict the typical infantryman's equipment of gas mask and water bottle and a hand grenade, with emerging palm branch, is shown at each corner. The front and two sides are engraved with the text "Here the invader was brought to a standstill 1918" in English, Dutch, and French. This was a change from Vauthier's original and more visceral text: "Here the thrust of the barbarian was broken".

== Today ==
During the Second World War, 24 of the monuments were destroyed and, as of 2013, only 93 survive anywhere – 12 of these in the Ypres Salient. Some of the remaining monuments are in poor condition.

In February 2019, a new monument was erected at Morbecque, in the Vauthier-style but in a white-coloured stone, to mark the location of the headquarters of the British Third Army. The stone is surmounted with the Brodie helmet on a laurel wreath but does not show the standard text. It is instead engraved with the names of the first and last British soldiers to die in action and the English text "Here fought the valiant British soldiers".
