= Arnold Waterlow: a Life =

1924 novel

Arnold Waterlow: a Life is a 1924 novel by author May Sinclair. Like Sinclair's earlier novel The Life and Death of Harriet Frean, Arnold Waterlow: a Life chronologically details the life of a single character.

== Plot ==
Born in 1863 to a well-off family in East Ferry, Arnold spends his early childhood in a large house with his parents, his older brother Richard, and his older sister Charlotte. When Arnold is seven, the Waterlow family moves to a smaller house in Ilford due to money troubles. They live next door to the Godden family. Mr. Godden is a tea merchant, and Mrs. Waterlow forbids her family from talking to Goddens because of their inferior social status.

When Arnold is 12, he goes away to school at Cheltenham College, where Richard is already a student. At Cheltenham, he becomes friends with Albert and Wilfrid Godden. Arnold does well in school, excelling in Greek and Latin. Like Arnold, May Sinclair also attended Cheltenham College.

Arnold's father, an alcoholic, dies when Arnold is 14. Upon his death, the Waterlow family discovers that Mr. Waterlow lost most of the family's money through imprudent investing in gold mines and speculation. Because the family must live on a much-reduced income, Arnold is forced to leave Cheltenham and go to work as an office boy for a cheesemonger in London. Mr. Godden encourages Arnold to pursue an education through reading, telling Arnold how he hates his own business. Mr. Godden lends Arnold books on philosophy, and they have frequent discussions about metaphysics. Despite Arnold's lack of interest in business, he does well as an office boy and is promoted to a clerk.

When Arnold is twenty, he meets fourteen-year-old Rosalind (“Linda”) Verney at Winifred’ Godden's birthday party. Rosalind, the cousin of the Godden children, studies violin in Leipzig, Germany. Arnold almost immediately falls in love with Rosalind. Rosalind plays her violin at Winifred's birthday party, but is unable to complete the Kreutzer Sonata and breaks down in tears. Rosalind returns to Germany to continue her violin training; Arnold leaves his clerk job at the cheesemonger's, and begins to work as a clerk for Mr. Godden.

Rosalind returns to England in 1888, five years after she and Arnold first met. Rosalind gives a successful recital in Steinway Hall in London, and continues to study violin in Leipzig, hesitant to perform again until she is a better violinist. When she is twenty-one, Rosalind moves to London and lives with a friend, Mary Unwind. Arnold spends a lot of time with Rosalind, yet is hesitant to declare his feelings for her because he is too poor to marry. Rosalind meets Max Schoonhoven, a poor pianist living in the attic of her building. Max and Rosalind begin practicing together. Rosalind financially supports Max, to Arnold's disapproval. Arnold proposes to Rosalind, but she turns him down. Rosalind and Max become lovers and go to Paris. They give a series of successful performances and go on an American tour.

Max marries Molly Dexter, a wealthy American woman who has enough money to support his musical career. Rosalind returns to England. Arnold proposes again. Rosalind accepts Arnold, but tells him she won't be able to resist running away with Max if he shows up again. After marrying, Rosalind and Arnold move to Hampstead and have a son, who soon dies from meningitis. Rosalind sinks into a deep depression and refuses to play music.

Max writes to Rosalind, asking her to come see him perform in London. Rosalind and Arnold attend his performance, despite Arnold's misgivings. Soon after the performance, Rosalind leaves Arnold to live in Paris near Max and his wife. Arnold tells Rosalind that he forgives her and will take her back if Max leaves her in the future.

Richard tells Arnold that he has lost all of their mother's income through speculation. Arnold doesn't tell his mother about Richard's speculation, instead meeting her income through his own salary and letting her that he, instead of Richard, made bad investments. Richard moves to Australia. Mrs. Waterlow moves into Arnold's house in Hampstead.

Rosalind writes to Arnold, asking him to visit her poor friend Effie Warren. Arnold visits Effie. They eventually fall in love and begin an affair, despite the firm disapproval of Arnold's mother. Effie moves into Arnold's Hampstead house when his mother goes to live with Charlotte.

Arnold gets pneumonia and almost dies. Effie and Mrs. Waterlow care for him. Effie tells Mrs. Waterlow that Arnold provides all of her income out of his own salary. Arnold's mother is apologetic for the way she treated Arnold and how she didn't love him like she loved Richard.

Arnold and Effie continue living happily together. Rosalind gets neuritis in her arm, leaving her unable to perform. As a result, Max leaves Rosalind. Rosalind comes back to London and asks Arnold to visit her. Arnold and Effie agree that Arnold must go back to Rosalind. In their last few days together, Effie becomes sick and dies. Arnold spends a year grieving, then reconciles with Rosalind.

== Reception ==
In the 1925 edition of The Sewanee Review, George Herbert Clarke wrote, “Miss Sinclair's Arnold is a real figure, a true comrade in his search through Spinoza, Kant, Hegel, Berkeley, and his own manly mind, for the God-beyond-God. As in Mary Olivier and Harriet Frean, the life is traced from infancy, with a deft detailing and loving irony. Arnold's boyhood at home and at school, his rigid yet unsophisticated mother, his reckless brother and superior sister, his friendships, his loves, the routine of his daily life, his ungrudging sacrifices, and above all, his deeper thoughts as evoked in soliloquy and conversation, are faithfully set down for us. Rosalind Verney and Effie Warren, the two women who entered his life – one with a shadowed blessing, the other with a complete and constant sympathy – are created with delicate insight, but Effie is the true heroine. His friends, Mary Unwin and Winifred Godden, are also charactered with quick sympathy. Arnold Waterlow is not its author's masterpiece, but it is a sincere and moving document in the art of life.”

In a 1985 article in Tulsa Studies in Women's Literature Diane F. Gillespie calls Rosalind Verney's choice between two men, Max and Arnold, the "problem of marriage for the woman artist" and states that "Arnold is Sinclair's equivalent of the sacrificing woman who supports an artist."
