= Emily Jackson Children's Hip Hospital =

Former hospital in Sevenoaks, England

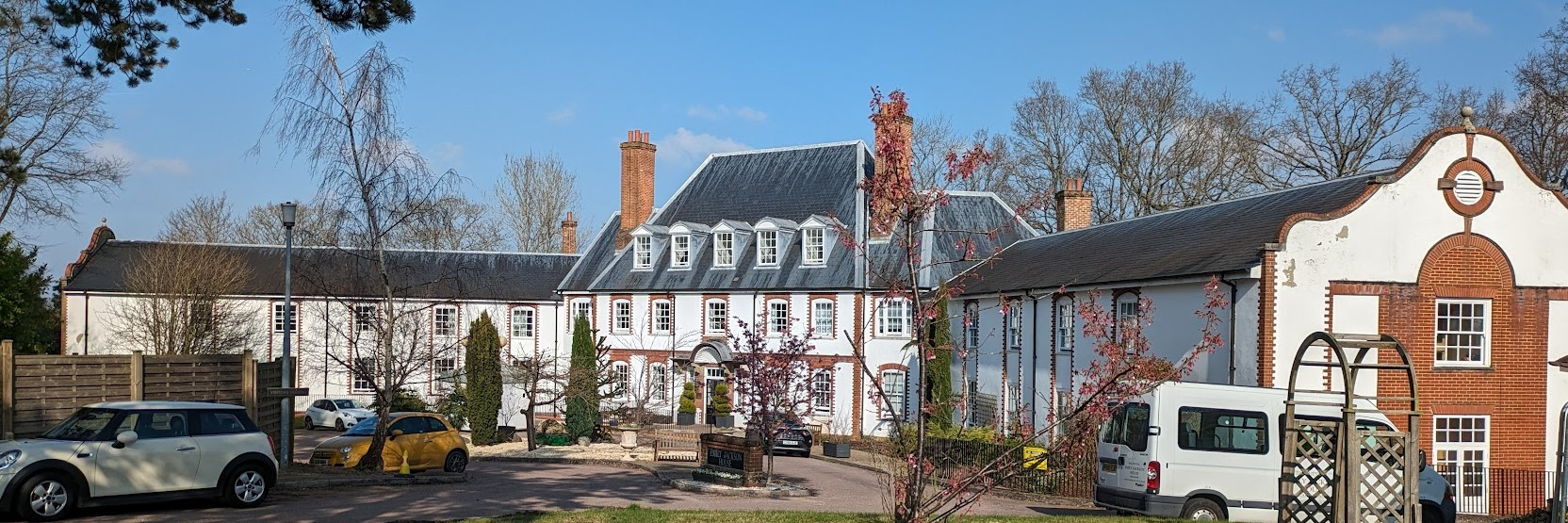
Emily Jackson Care Home, formerly Emily Jackson Children's Hip Hospital

The Emily Jackson Children's Hip Hospital was a hospital in Sevenoaks, Kent, England. The building now contains the Emily Jackson Care Home.

== History ==
The hospital was established by Emily Jackson (1846–1916) in 1871 in a small cottage on the Vine in Sevenoaks.

In 1876 it was moved to Park Lane, Sevenoaks and became the Vine Hip Hospital. The hospital was extended between 1880–1892 to incorporate a dispensary, dining room and new ward. By 1897 the hospital had 25 patients, and had outgrown its premises. In 1900, Jackson raised over £10,000 and purchased land in Eardley Road, Sevenoaks on which to build a larger, 45 bed hospital. Her brother, the notable architect Thomas Graham Jackson, designed the new building. Emily Jackson was matron of the hospital, which cared for children with tuberculosis of the hip. In 1948 following the advent of the NHS the hospital was merged with Cheyne Hospital for Children in Chelsea, London and was renamed the Cheyne and Sevenoaks Hip Hospital. With the advent of more effective treatments for TB, the hospital became redundant, and in 1958 the hospital was closed and ran by Sevenoaks Hospital as a wing for 'geriatric' / elderly patients. This finally closed in 1988, and it was reopened as a private nursing home called the Emily Jackson Care Home.

== Notable staff ==
- Elsie Knocker (1884–1978), British nurse and ambulance driver in the First World War, and author.
