= Frank Richards (British Army soldier) =

British historian (1883–1961)

- Born: Francis Philip Woodruff; 7 April 1883; Monmouthshire, Wales
- Died: 26 August 1961 (aged 78)
- Military career
- Allegiance: United Kingdom
- Branch: British Army; Territorial Force
- Service years: 1901–1919
- Rank: Private
- Service number: 6584
- Unit: Royal Welch Fusiliers
- Conflicts: First World War
- Awards: Distinguished Conduct Medal; Military Medal
- Other work: Memoirist

Francis Philip Richards, DCM, MM (né Woodruff; 7 April 1883 – 26 August 1961) was a decorated British Army soldier of the First World War and an author. Born in Monmouthshire, he was orphaned at the age of nine, and was then brought up by his aunt and uncle in the Blaina area of the South Wales Valleys in industrial Monmouthshire. The uncle, his mother's twin brother, and surnamed Richards, adopted Frank who then changed his surname. During the 1890s Frank Richards worked as coal miner and joined Royal Welch Fusiliers in 1901, serving in the British forces in British India and Burma from 1902 to 1909, after which he transferred to the reserves. He is best known as the author of one of the most widely acclaimed memoirs of the First World War to be written by a ranker, Old Soldiers Never Die.

== Early life ==
Richards, an orphan, was brought up by his aunt and maternal uncle in Blaina, Monmouthshire, where, in the 1890s, he worked as a coal miner. His cousin David Thomas Richards (1883–1932) enlisted in the South Wales Borderers on 29 June 1898 and served in the Second Boer War. He visited his local recruitment sergeant in 1900, and tried to persuade him he was over 18 years old, but was told to come back in 12 months. A year later, he enlisted at Brecon. He joined the Royal Welch Fusiliers in April 1901 and served in India and Burma from 1902–09 when, having completed eight years with the colours, he transferred to the Army Reserve for the remaining four years of his twelve year enlistment. He extended his reserve service for a further four years in 1912.

== First World War ==
A reservist soldier when war broke out in August 1914, working as a timber assistant, Richards rejoined the 2nd Battalion Royal Welch Fusiliers, in which he remained for the duration of the war. It was while drinking in the bar of the Castle Hotel at Blaina that he heard the news of the outbreak of war.

Richards, who at no point rose above the rank of private during the war, refusing any offer of promotion, was awarded the Distinguished Conduct Medal and Military Medal and saw action in virtually all of the major British campaigns on the Western Front without suffering any notable injury. The conditions in damp, unhealthy trenches, however, had a detrimental effect upon his health. In addition to malaria and rheumatism he had haemorrhoids, aggravated by the trench environment, which necessitated substantial surgery. Unable to return to the coal mines following the war because of this decline in his physical health, Richards was obliged to earn his living from numerous temporary jobs.

== Author and later life ==
Fifteen years after the end of the First World War, Richards published in 1933 his account of the war from the standpoint of the regular soldier. It differs in many ways from memoirs written by officers who joined the army specifically to serve in the war, and has been called "a brilliant insight into the life of a soldier in the early stages of the twentieth century". Old Soldiers Never Die was written with the unaccredited assistance of fellow Royal Welch Fusilier Robert Graves, who advised on grammar, style and punctuation. It was an instant success and has never been out of print since. Graves and Siegfried Sassoon, another Royal Welch Fusilier, both receive approving mentions in the book, as do other officers. Richards followed up Old Soldiers with another successful memoir, this time of his service in India, Old Soldier Sahib, in 1936. He always denied any element of bravery in his character, simply saying that he was doing his job.

Richards was interviewed by the BBC for their multi-part documentary of the conflict, The Great War, in 1954. He enjoyed a drink and a bet and married late in life, to Mary James, having one daughter, Margaret.

Richards, who continued to correspond regularly with Robert Graves, died in 1961 at the age of 78. He features in Captain J. C. Dunn's The War The Infantry Knew 1914–1919 as "Big Dick".

== Books ==
- Richards, Frank (2003) [1936]. Old Soldier Sahib. Uckfield: The Naval and Military Press Ltd. ISBN 978-1-84342-558-8.
- Richards, Frank (2009) [1933]. Old Soldiers Never Die. Uckfield: The Naval and Military Press Ltd. ISBN 978-1-84342-026-2.
