= Elsie Knocker =

British nurse and ambulance driver (1884–1978)

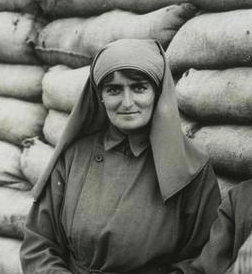
- One of "The Madonnas of Pervyse"
- Born: Elizabeth Blackall Shapter; 29 June 1884; Exeter, Devon, England
- Died: 26 April 1978 (aged 93); Ashtead, Surrey, England
- Education: St. Nicholas's, Folkestone; Château Lutry, Switzerland
- Years active: September 1914 – March 1918
- Medical career
- Profession: Nurse
- Institutions: Children's Hip Hospital, Sevenoaks; Queen Charlotte's Hospital; Munro Ambulance Corps
- Awards: Order of Léopold II (1915), Military Medal (1917), Order of St. John of Jerusalem (1918)

Elsie Knocker, later Baroness de T'Serclaes, MM, OStJ (née Elizabeth Blackall Shapter; 29 July 1884 – 26 April 1978) was a British nurse and ambulance driver in World War I who, together with her friend Mairi Chisholm, won numerous medals for bravery and for saving the lives of thousands of soldiers on the Western Front in Belgium. Dubbed "The Madonnas of Pervyse" by the press, the two were among the most photographed women of the war.

== Biography ==
=== Early life ===
She was born Elizabeth Blackall Shapter in Exeter, Devon on 29 June 1884, the youngest of five children to Dr. Thomas Lewis and Charlotte Shapter (née Bayly). During her childhood she picked up the nickname, "Elsie". She was orphaned at an early age. Her mother died when she was four years old and her father died from tuberculosis two years later. She was subsequently adopted by Lewis Edward Upcott, a teacher at Marlborough College, and his wife Emily who sent her to be educated at St. Nicholas's, Folkestone, and then at the exclusive Château Lutry in Switzerland.

=== Hospital service and first marriage ===
After training at the Emily Jackson Children's Hip Hospital in Sevenoaks, she married Leslie Duke Knocker in 1906, with whom she had a son, Kenneth Duke, a year later. But the marriage failed and, soon after she was divorced, she began training as a midwife at Queen Charlotte's Hospital. Since being divorced was a status frowned upon in Edwardian England, Knocker invented the myth that her husband had died in Java, leaving her a widow.

Being a divorcee/widow and single mother, however, hardly kept Knocker away from her passions. She became an ardent amateur motorbike enthusiast and when riding wore a dark green leather skirt and long leather coat buttoned all the way down with a belt "to keep it all together" designed by Dunhill. She earned the name "Gypsy" because of her love of the open road and membership of the Gypsy Motorcycle Club. She possessed a number of motorbikes including a Scott, a Douglas solo, and a Chater-Lea with a sidecar which would travel with her to the Western Front.

=== World War I ===
When war was declared in 1914, Knocker wrote to her friend and fellow motorcycle fanatic, Mairi Chisholm, that there was "work to be done", and suggested they go to London to become dispatch riders for the Women's Emergency Corps. When Chisholm was chosen to join Hector Munro's Flying Ambulance Corps she was able to convince Munro to accept Knocker as well, as she had some training as a nurse, was an excellent mechanic and chauffeur, and spoke both French and German. This meant that Knocker had to cancel a "ladies stiff reliability trial" with "plenty of hairpin bends" over 120 miles of Hampshire and Dorset countryside. The day before she was due to ship out she wrote in her diary:

"This time tomorrow night I shall be in Belgium… in the midst of all the terrors of war."

==== War service, 1914–1915 ====
In the early evening of 25 September 1914, Knocker, Chisholm and the other volunteers (which included Lady Dorothie Feilding and May Sinclair) followed Dr. Munro down the gang-plank of the S.S. Princess Clementine at Ostend, West Flanders. While visiting the town of Nazareth (8 miles south-west of Ghent where the corps was initially quartered) Knocker was witness to the aftermath of a massacre when she came across 26 Belgian military policemen who had been shot and mutilated by the Germans.

At the end of October, the corps relocated to Furnes in unoccupied Belgium, near Dunkirk, where the women worked tirelessly picking up wounded soldiers mid-way from the front and bringing them back to their field hospital at the rear. Knocker and Chisholm soon realised they could save more lives by treating the wounded directly on the front lines.

In November, the two decided to leave the corps and set up their own dressing station five miles east in a town named Pervyse, north of Ypres, just one hundred yards from the trenches. Here, in a vacant cellar which they named the "Poste de Secours Anglais" ("British First Aid Post"), the two would spend the next three and a half years aiding the wounded in the Belgian sector. Knocker gave most of the medical attention, while Chisholm transported the injured, often in terrible conditions and under fire, to a base hospital 15 miles away.

No longer affiliated with the Belgian Red Cross, they were forced to raise their own funds. With donations they arranged for the cellar to be reinforced with concrete and had a steel door fitted, supplied by Harrods. Through sheer perseverance Knocker was able to arrange for the two of them to be officially seconded to the Belgian garrison stationed there. Equipped with cameras, both women photographed not only each other but also much of the suffering around them.

In January 1915, they were rewarded for their courageous work on the front lines when they were both decorated by King Albert I of Belgium with the Order of Léopold II, Knights Cross (with palm).

==== Second marriage, 1916 ====
In January 1916, Knocker was married again, to Baron Harold de T'Serclaes, a pilot in the Belgian Flying Corps, and a devout Roman Catholic. The newly formed Baroness wrote of her marriage: "So much of me went into my work that I suppose I was easily swept along on a tide of glamour and welcome frivolity. Perhaps I had a desire just to drift for once, not to struggle. It was pleasant to imagine that all would turn out well, and after fifteen months' risking my life at the Front, marriage seemed a comparatively small risk to take. I did want someone to take some of the burden off my shoulders and thought how good it would be for Kenneth to have a father. After a lightning honeymoon we hardly saw one another again. I was too busy at Pervyse, and my husband had to return to his squadron".

==== War service, 1916–1918 ====
Knocker and Chisholm were engaged in multiple battlefield rescues, even carrying fallen men on their backs to their first-aid station. After she and Chisholm rescued a wounded German pilot in No Man's Land both women were awarded the British Military Medal, and were made Officers of the Most Venerable Order of St. John of Jerusalem.

Fellow corps volunteer May Sinclair said of Knocker: "She had an irresistible inclination towards the greatest possible danger."

As word spread of their deeds they began to receive visits from journalists, photographers and VIP's, becoming among the most photographed women of the war. Both women were gassed during the German offensive in March 1918 and had to return home. Both saw out the rest of the war in Britain as members of the newly formed Royal Air Force; the Women's Royal Air Force.

=== Inter-war period ===
By 1919, Knocker's marriage to the Baron had unraveled when both he and the Roman Catholic Church discovered the truth about her previous marriage. For Chisholm, this deception ended their friendship. The two barely spoke again. As part of the settlement Knocker was allowed to remain a Baroness in name only.

=== World War II ===
In 1939, at the outbreak of World War II, the Baroness joined the Women's Auxiliary Air Force (WAAF) as an Aircraftwoman 2nd class, becoming an officer in February 1940. Working with RAF Fighter Command, she rose to the rank of Squadron Officer in March 1942, and was twice Mentioned in Despatches.

Tragedy struck on 3 July 1942 with the death of her son, Wing Commander Kenneth Duke Knocker, who was killed when his plane was shot down over Groningen. She left the RAF in October 1942 following her son's death and because she needed to look after her elderly foster-father.

=== Later life ===
After the Second World War, the Baroness participated in raising funds for the RAF Association and the Benevolent Fund.

She lived in the Earl Haig Homes in Park Lane, Ashtead, Surrey, from approximately 1926 until her death. There she had a detached house on the edge of the estate, reached by a flight of steps from Park Lane, and called ‘Pervyse’.

Late in life, she began breeding Chihuahuas and was always accompanied by three or four of them. She was greatly concerned about the welfare of both animals and the conservation of Ashtead Common where she could often be seen walking her pets, "flamboyantly dressed with large earrings and a voluminous dark cloak".

On 26 April 1978, she died, aged 93 of pneumonia and senile dementia. She had never remarried.

== Awards and decorations ==
Officer of the Order of St. John of Jerusalem
Military Medal
1914 Star
British War Medal
Victory Medal
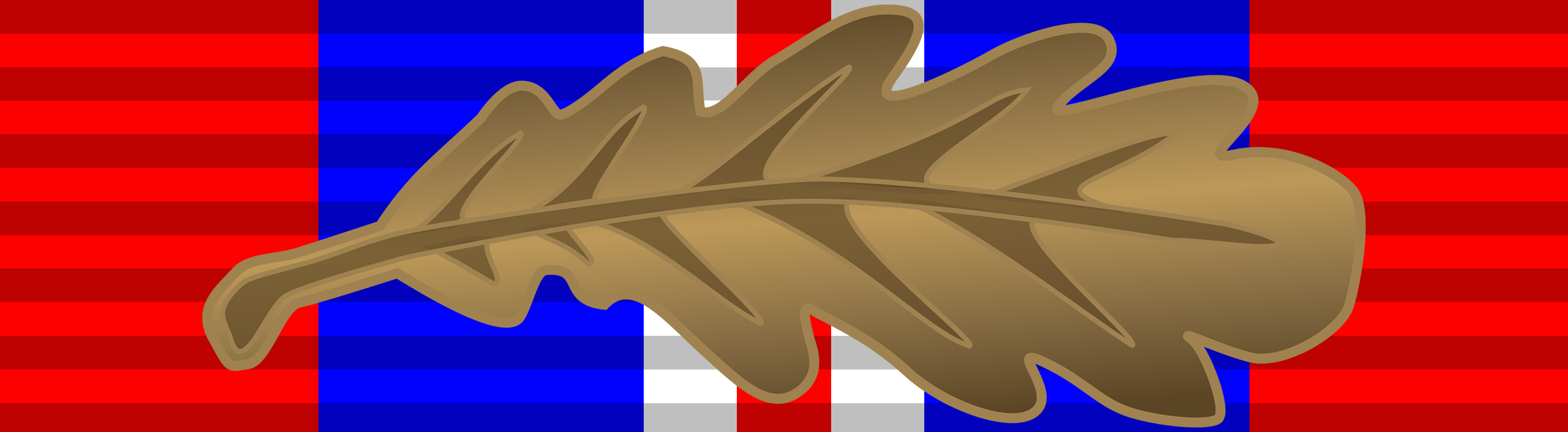
War Medal 1939–1945, with oakleaf for a mention in dispatches
Defence Medal 1939–1945
Knight of the Order of Léopold II with palm
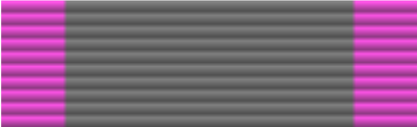
Belgian Queen Elisabeth Medal

== Diaries ==
The Imperial War Museum holds Knocker's diaries along with recordings and transcripts of interviews.

== Memorials ==
In November 2014, a statue of Knocker and Mairi Chisholm was unveiled in the garden of the Hotel Ariane in Ypres, Belgium. In November 2017 Knocker was recognised with a blue plaque on the house where she was born in Exeter.

== Gallery ==
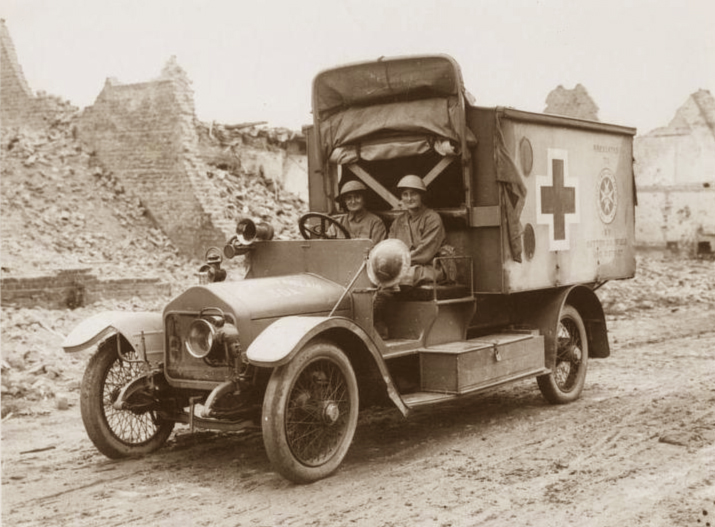
Knocker and Chisholm in their converted Wolseley Ambulance, Pervyse, Belgium, c. 1916

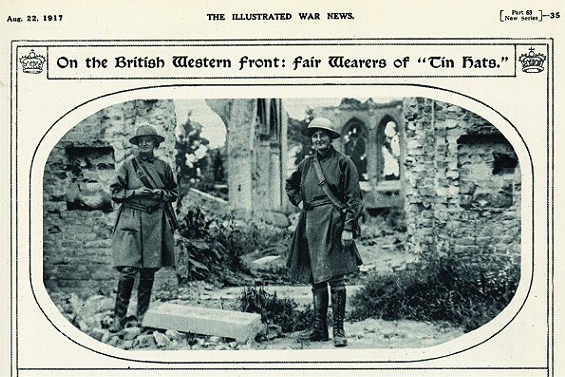
Knocker and Chisholm pose in the ruins of a church in Pervyse, Belgium for "Illustrated War News", 22 April 1917

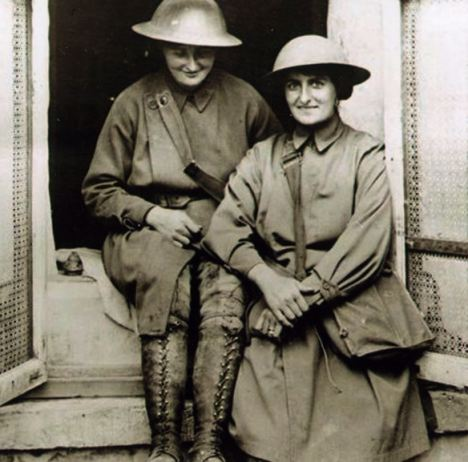
Chisholm and Knocker wearing their Tommy helmets. Pervyse, Belgium, c. 1917

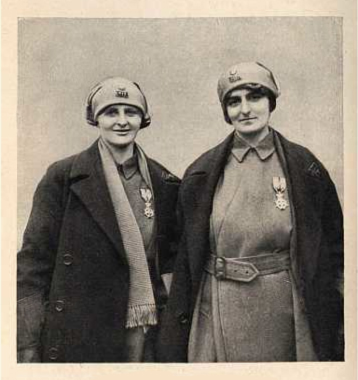
Chisholm and Knocker display their Order of Léopold II, medals. On their headscarves is the insignia of the Belgian Army's 3rd Division, c. 1918

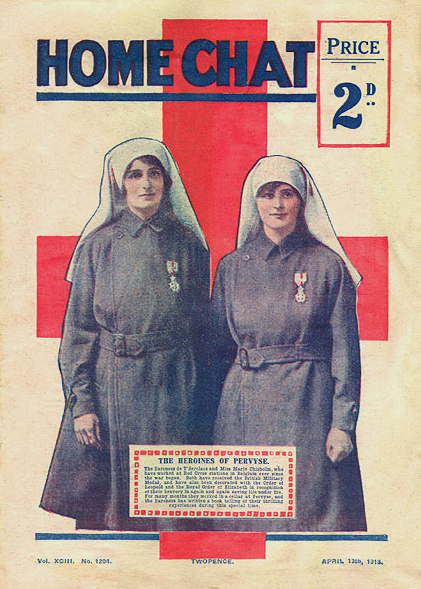
Knocker and Chisholm on the cover of "Home Chat" magazine, 11 April 1918

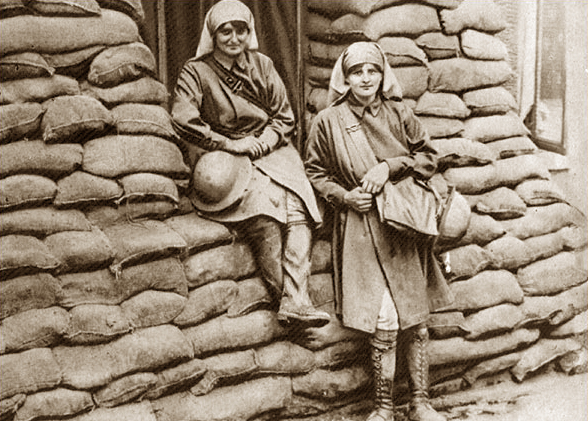
Knocker and Chisholm outside their advanced dressing station, Pervyse, Belgium, c. 1918

== See also ==
- Mairi Chisholm
- Lady Dorothie Feilding
- May Sinclair
- Albert I of Belgium
- Alexander Cambridge, 1st Earl of Athlone
- Western Front

== Bibliography ==
- Atkinson, Diane. Elsie and Mairi Go to War: Two Extraordinary Women on the Western Front. Cornerstone. (2009)
- Hallam, Andrew & Nicola. Lady Under Fire on the Western Front: The Great War Letters of Lady Dorothie Feilding MM. Pen & Sword Military. (2010)
- Mitton, Geraldine Edith, T'Sercles, Baroness Elsie, Chisholm, Mairi. The Cellar-House of Pervyse : A Tale of Uncommon Things from the Journals and Letters of the Baroness T'Serclaes and Mairi Chisholm. A.C. Black. (1917)
- T'Serclaes, Elsie Baroness de. Flanders and Other Fields. Harrap. (1964)
- Vanleene, Patrick. Op Naar de Grote Oorlog. Mairi, Elsie en de anderen in Flanders Fields. De Klaproos (2001)
- Vanleene, Patrick. Fearless: Dorothie Feilding's War, 1914–1917. Academia Press (forthcoming 2015).
