= Military Medal =

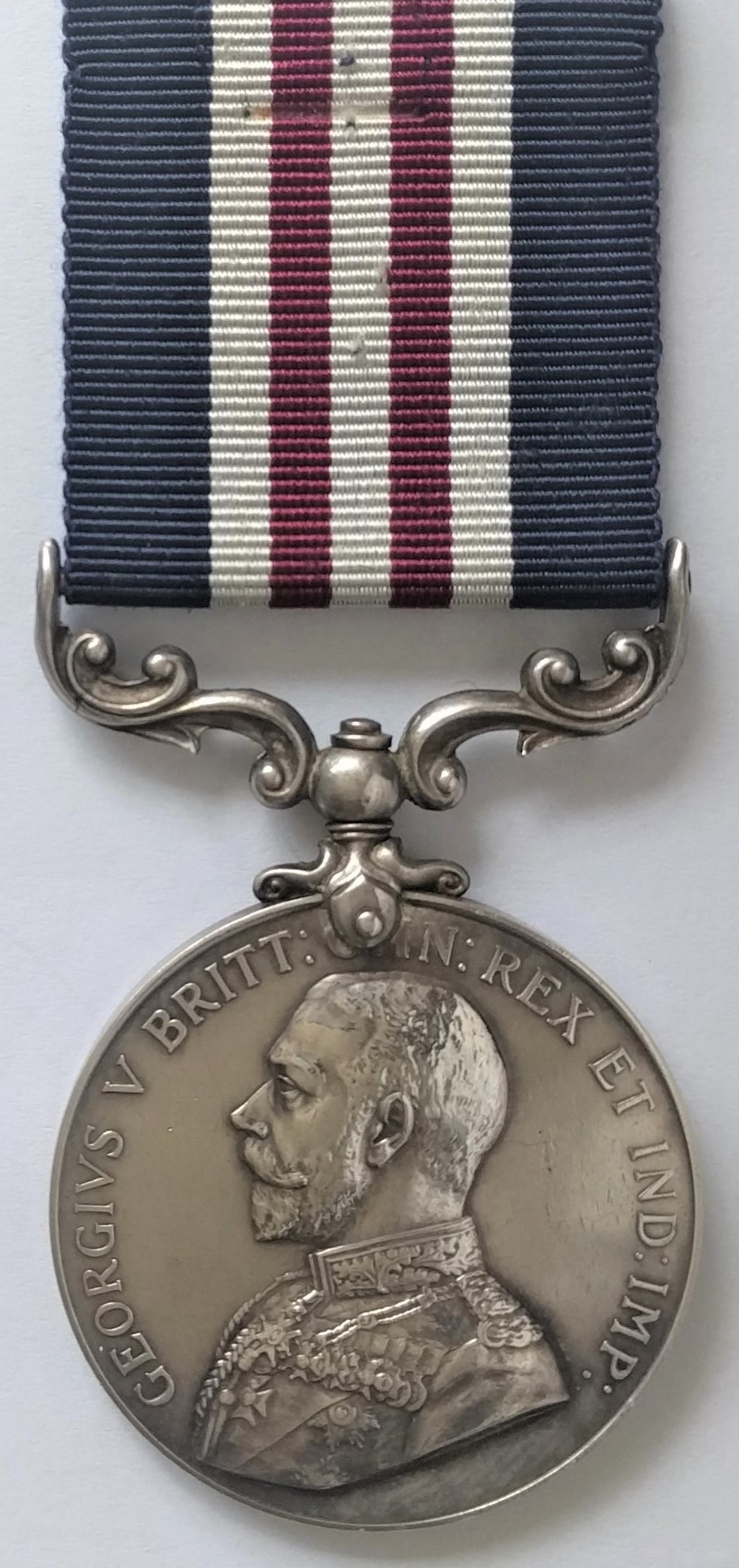
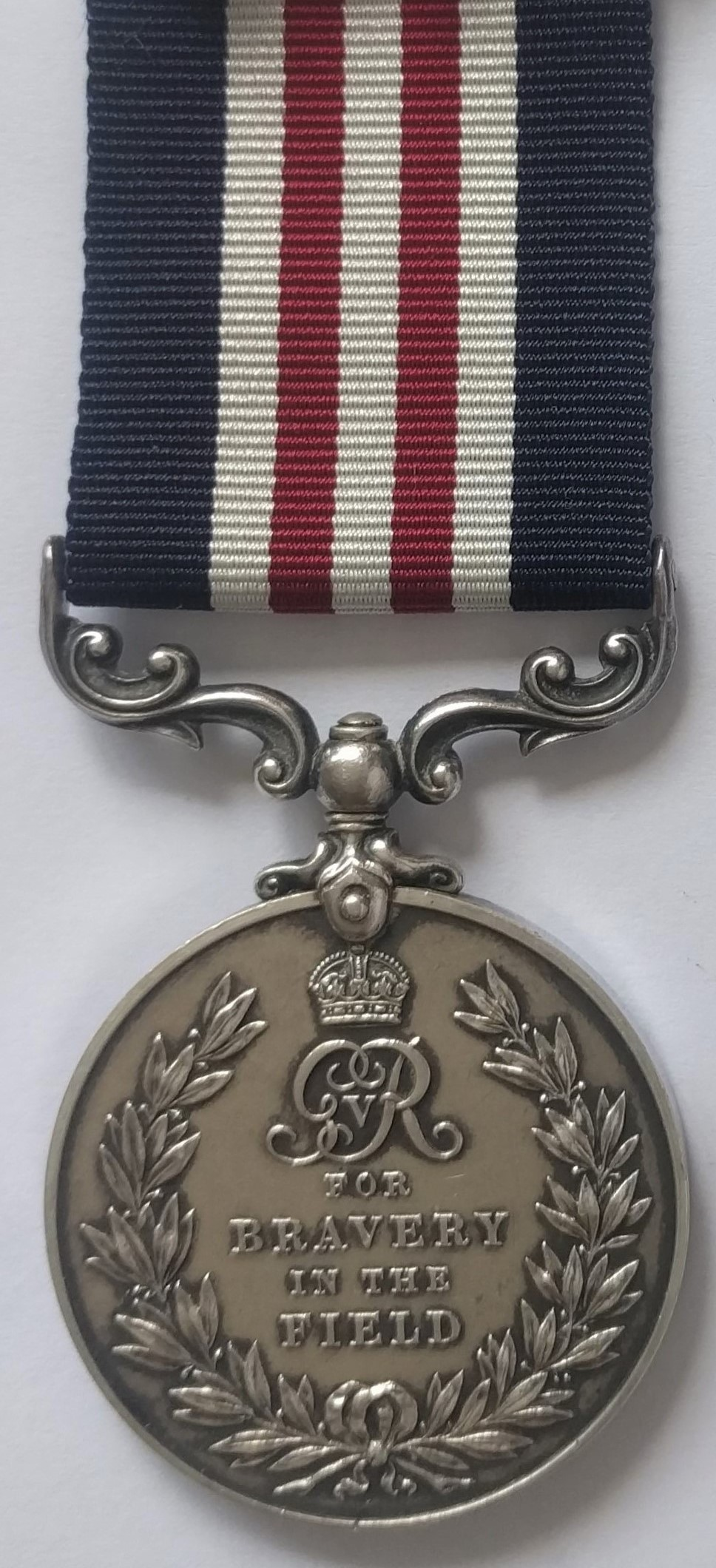
- Obverse and reverse of medal
- Type: Military decoration
- Awarded for: Acts of gallantry and devotion to duty under fire
- Presented by: UK and Commonwealth
- Eligibility: British and Commonwealth forces
- Post-nominals: MM
- Status: Discontinued in 1993
- Established: 25 March 1916 (backdated to 1914)
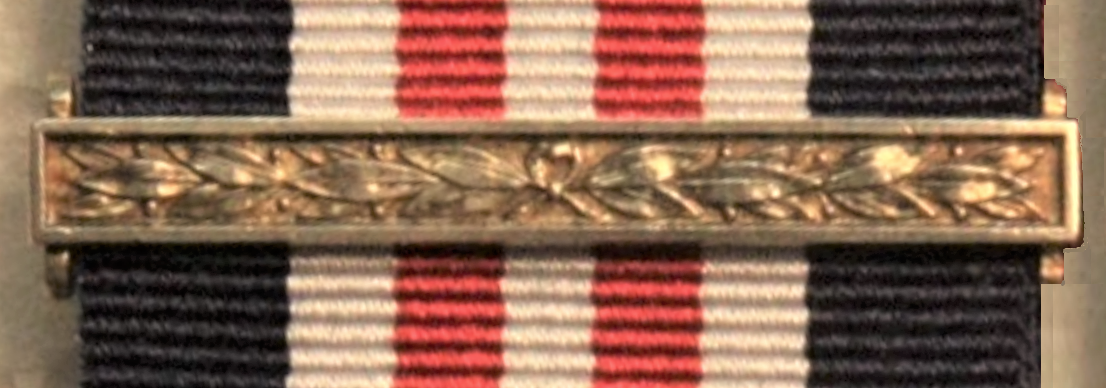
- Ribbon bar Ribbon bar with rosette to indicate second award Second award bar

Order of Wear
- Next (higher): Distinguished Service Medal
- Next (lower): Distinguished Flying Medal
- Related: Military Cross

The Military Medal (MM) was a military decoration awarded to personnel of the British Army and other arms of the armed forces, and to personnel of other Commonwealth countries, below commissioned rank, for bravery in battle on land. The award was established in 1916, with retrospective application to 1914, and was awarded to other ranks for "acts of gallantry and devotion to duty under fire". The award was discontinued in 1993, when it was replaced by the Military Cross, which was extended to all ranks, while other Commonwealth nations instituted their own award systems in the post war period.

== History ==
The Military Medal was established on 25 March 1916. It was awarded to other ranks including non-commissioned officers and warrant officers, and ranked below the Distinguished Conduct Medal (DCM). Awards to British and Commonwealth forces were announced in the London Gazette, but not honorary awards to allied forces. (Lists of awards to allied forces were published by The National Archives in 2018 and are kept in country specific files within WO 388/6.)

When the medal was first introduced, it was unpopular among regular soldiers. MM and DCM recipient Frank Richards wrote that "the Military Medal without a shadow of a doubt had been introduced to save awarding too many DCMs. The old regular soldiers thought very little of the new decoration". Both the DCM and the MM attracted a gratuity and the decoration allowance of an extra sixpence a day to veterans with a disability pension. However, the allowance was only awarded once even if the recipient was awarded more than one gallantry award. The ratio in the First World War was approximately five MMs awarded for every DCM.

From September 1916 members of the Royal Naval Division, serving on Western Front alongside the Army, were made eligible for military decorations, including the Military Medal, for the war's duration. It could also be awarded to members of the Royal Air Force for gallant service on the ground.

Eligibility for the MM was extended, by a Royal Warrant dated 21 June 1916, to women whether British subjects or foreign, with the first awards gazetted on 1 September 1916. Although nurses of the Queen Alexandra's Imperial Military Nursing Service (QAIMNS) and the Territorial Force Nursing Service (TFNS) and other women serving with the British Army often had the social status of officers, they did not hold an officer's commission and were therefore ineligible for the Military Cross, but could be and were awarded the MM. Louisa Nolan, a civilian during the Easter Rising in Dublin, was awarded the Military Medal for her courage under fire in providing humanitarian aid to the wounded.

Since 1918 recipients of the Military Medal have been entitled to the post-nominal letters "MM".

Eligibility was extended to soldiers of the Indian Army in 1944.

The Military Medal was discontinued in 1993, as part of the review of the British honours system, which recommended removing distinctions of rank in respect of awards for bravery. Since then the Military Cross, previously only open to Commissioned and Warrant Officers, has been awarded to all ranks. The MM had also been awarded by Commonwealth countries but by the 1990s most, including Canada, Australia and New Zealand, were establishing their own honours systems and no longer recommended British honours.

== Description ==
The medal and ribbon had the following features:

- A circular silver medal of 36 mm diameter.
- The obverse bears the effigy of the reigning monarch and an appropriate inscription.
- The reverse has the inscription "for bravery in the field" in four lines, surrounded by a laurel wreath, surmounted by the Royal Cypher and Imperial Crown.
- The suspender is of an ornate scroll type.
- The ribbon is dark blue, 1 1/4 inches (32 mm) wide with five equal centre stripes of white, red, white, red, and white, each 1/8 inch (3 mm) wide.
- The name and service details of the recipient were impressed on the rim of the medal, although honorary awards to foreign recipients were issued unnamed.
- Silver, laurelled bars were authorised for subsequent awards, with a silver rosette worn on the ribbon bar to indicate the award of each bar.

=== Obverse variations ===
The medal was awarded with one of six obverse designs:

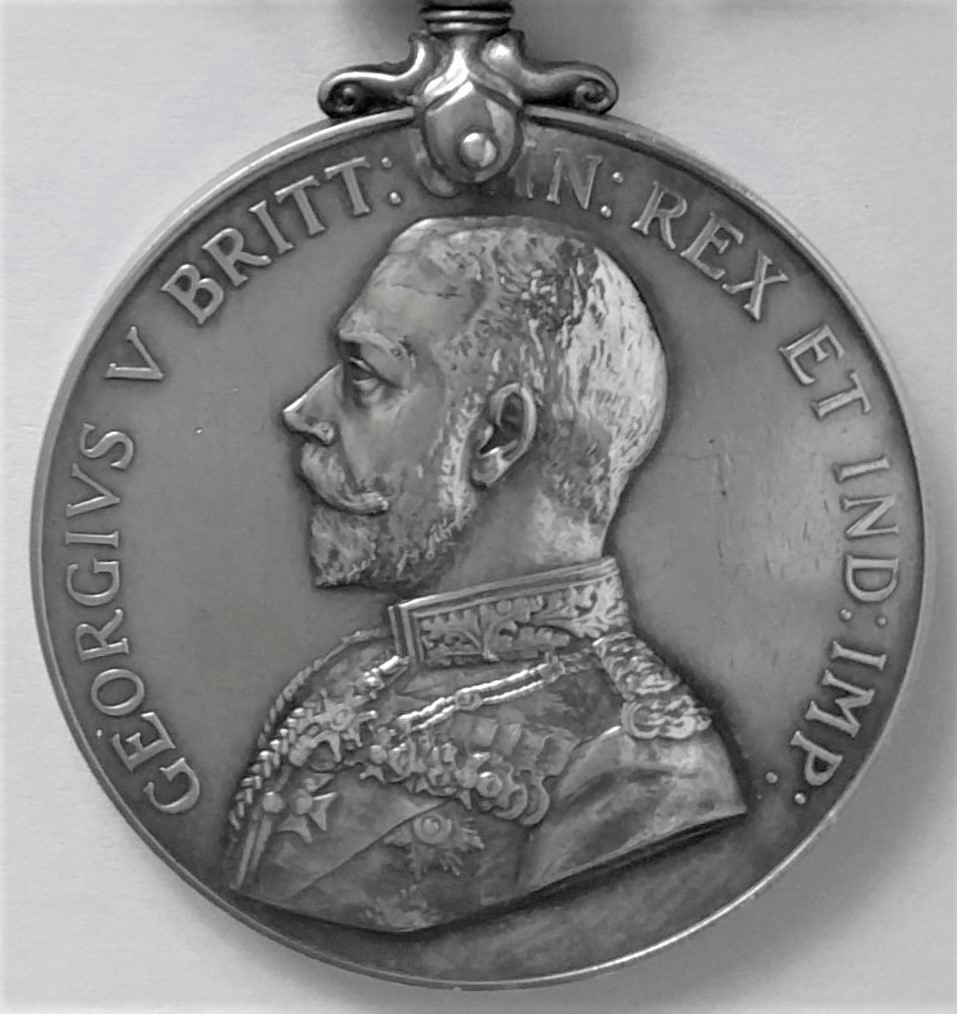
George V (1st type) in Field Marshal's uniform (1916–1930)

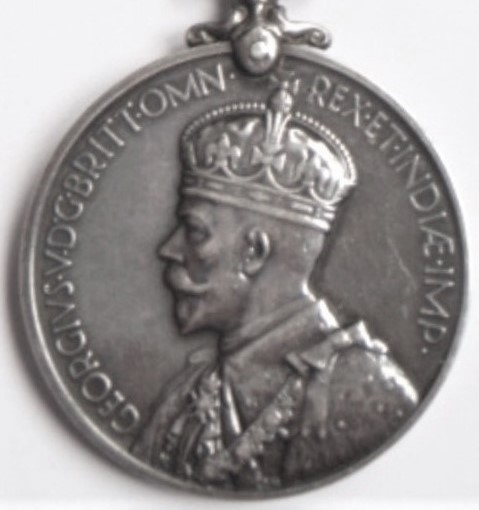
George V (2nd type) in crown and robes (1930–1937)

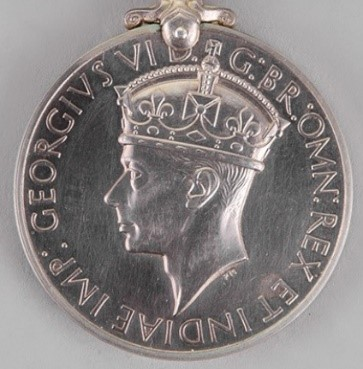
George VI (1st type); inscribed Indiae Imp (Latin for 'Emperor of India') (1938–1948)

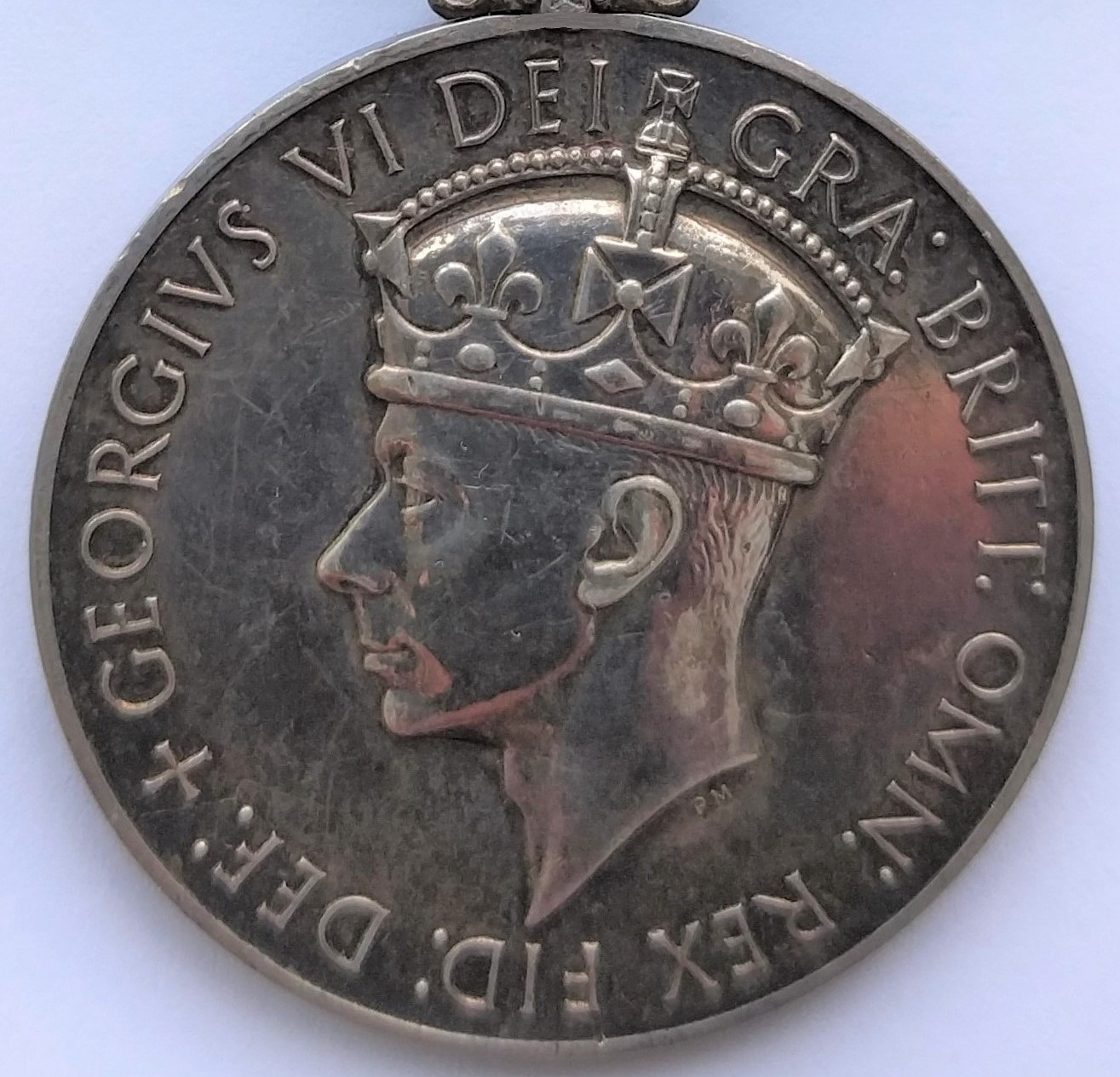
George VI (2nd type); omits 'Indiae Imp' (1949–1952)

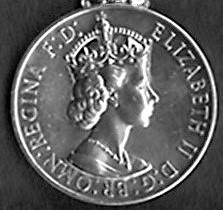
Elizabeth II (1st type); inscription has Br omn (Latin for 'of all the Britains') (1952–1958)

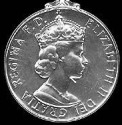
Elizabeth II (2nd type); inscription has Dei gratia (Latin for 'by the grace of God') (1958–1993)

== Numbers of awards ==
Between 1916 and 1993 approximately 138,517 medals and 6,167 bars were awarded. The dates below reflect the relevant London Gazette entries:

Period		Medals	1st bar	2nd bar	3rd bar	Honorary awards
First World War	1916–20	115,589	5,796	180	1	7,930
Inter–war	1920–39	311	4	–	–	–
Second World War	1939–46	15,225	177	1	–	660
Post–War	1947–93	1,044	8	–	–	–
Total	1916–1993	132,169	5,985	181	1	8,590

The above figures include awards to the Dominions:

In all, 13,654 Military Medals were awarded to those serving with Canadian forces, including 848 first bars and 38 second bars.

Australian Army members received 11,038 and 14 were to awarded Air Force personnel; 478 first bars were awarded, 15 second bars and one third bar.

Over 2,500 were awarded to New Zealanders, the last being for the Vietnam War.

The honorary MM awards were made to servicemen and women from eleven allied countries in the First World War, and nine in the Second World War.

During the First World War, 127 Military Medals were awarded to women, plus about a dozen honorary awards to foreign women.

There was one instance of a third bar being awarded, to Private Ernest Albert Corey, who served on the Western Front as a stretcher bearer in the 55th Australian Infantry Battalion.

The only recipient to receive two bars during the Second World War was Sergeant Fred Kite, Royal Tank Regiment.

== Selected recipients of the Military Medal ==
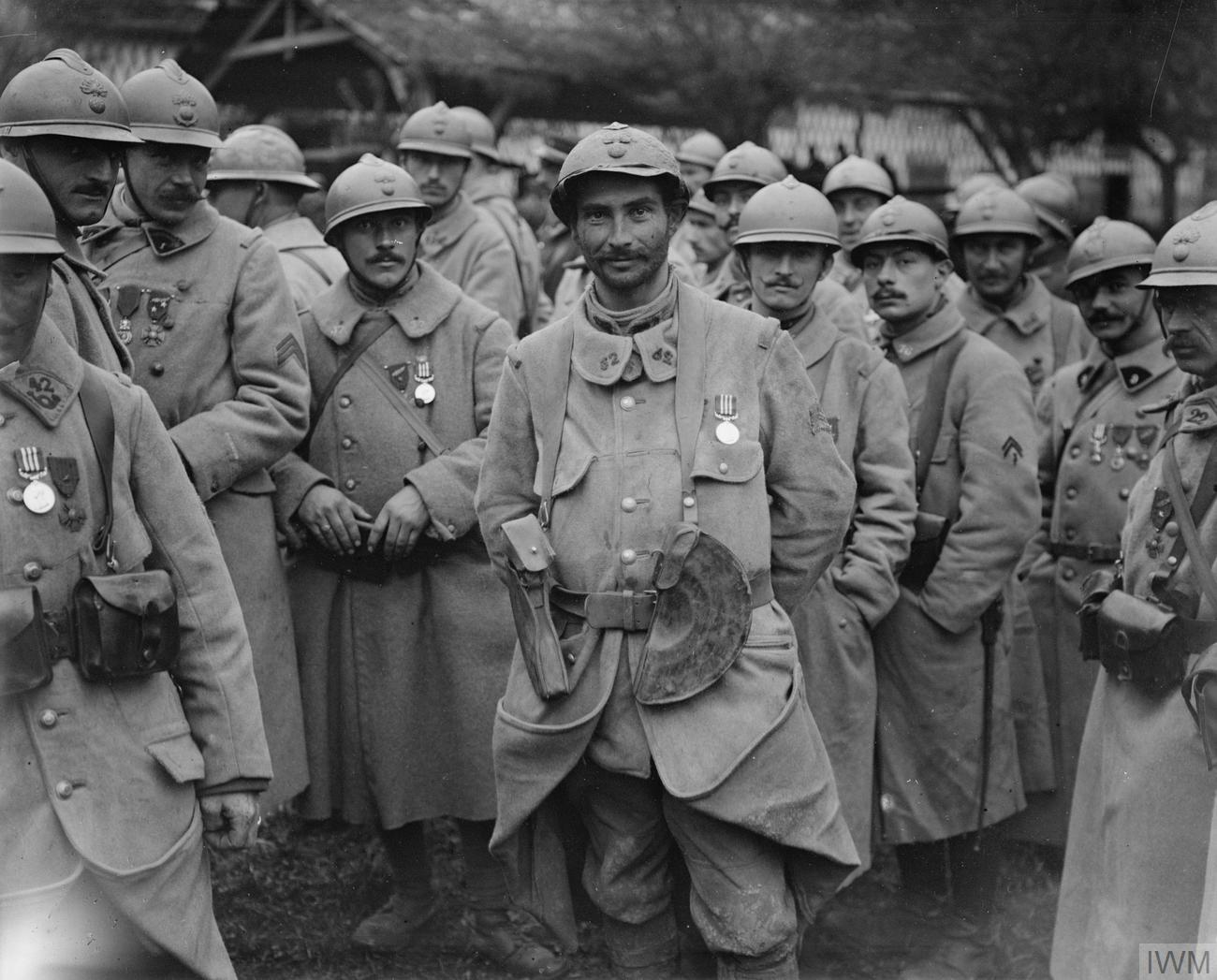
French soldiers, after having been awarded the Military Medal, Battle of the Somme 1916

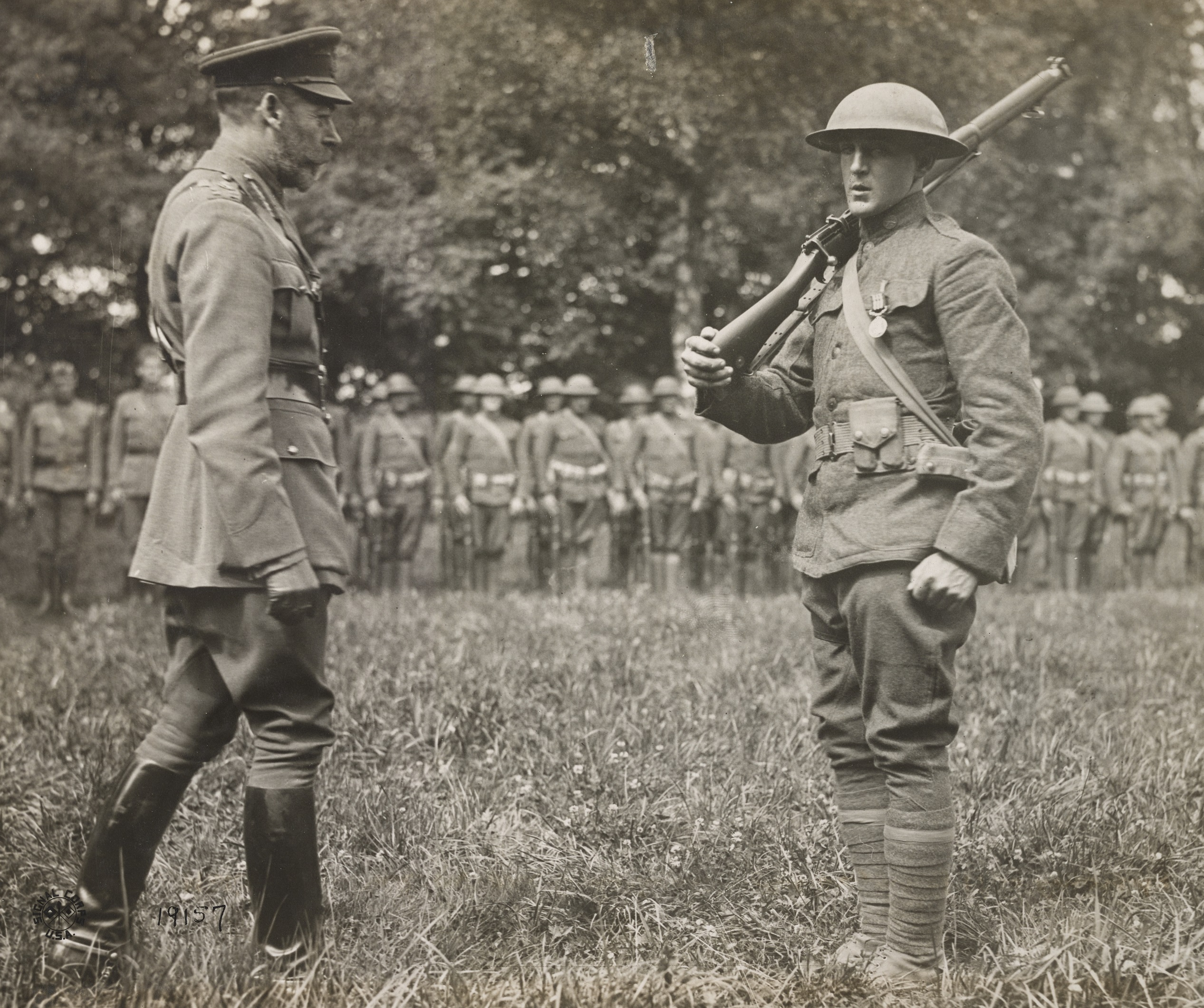
King George V decorating U.S. Army soldier James E. Krum with the Military Medal in 1918

Nearly 140,000 people have been awarded the Military Medal. Among the more notable recipients are:

=== First World War ===
- Billy Bennett, British comedian.
- Joe Cassidy, Scottish footballer.
- Phoebe Chapple, Australian medical practitioner, first female doctor awarded the Military Medal
- Mairi Chisholm, British volunteer ambulance driver.
- Douglas Clark, British rugby league footballer and wrestler.
- Jack Clough, British footballer.
- Jack Cock, British footballer.
- William Coltman, who was also awarded the Victoria Cross, and was the most highly decorated NCO of the First World War.
- Ernest Albert Corey, the only person to be awarded the MM four times.
- Lady Dorothie Feilding, first woman to be awarded the MM.
- Elsie Knocker, British volunteer nurse and ambulance driver.
- Norman Washington Manley, former First Minister of Jamaica, sergeant in the British Army during the First World War.
- James McCudden, the most highly decorated British pilot of the First World War.
- Richard McFadden, professional footballer with Clapton Orient, who was killed on the Somme on 23 October 1916.
- Frank Nicklin, Premier of Queensland from 1957 to 1968, the first non Labor Party premier since 1932.
- Francis Pegahmagabow, Canadian Expeditionary Force, Canada's most decorated indigenous soldier of the First World War, who was awarded 2 additional bars to his Military Medal.
- Frank Richards, who wrote about his wartime experiences, and who received both the DCM and the MM.
- Leigh Richmond Roose, Welsh International goalkeeper, the most famous pre-war footballer, missing on the Somme 7 October 1916
- Caleb James Shang, DCM & Bar, MM was the most highly decorated Chinese Australian soldier who served in the First World War
- Charles Rutherford, awarded the Military Cross, Military Medal and Victoria Cross.
- Violetta Thurstan, nurse who evacuated wounded soldiers while under fire.
- Karl Vernon, Olympic medallist oarsman and coach.
- Arthur Wesley Wheen, translator of All Quiet on the Western Front.
- Arch Whitehouse, RAF officer.
- Major-General F. F. Worthington was awarded the Military Medal for actions near Vimy Ridge.
- Langford Wellman Colley-Priest, Australian stretcher-bearer

=== Second World War ===
- Geoffrey Bingham, Australian theologian and author.
- Walter Bingham, Jewish refugee from Nazi Germany who served in Normandy and subsequently in Counter Intelligence.
- Barney F. Hajiro, Japanese American soldier and Medal of Honor recipient, awarded for his actions in France in 1944.
- Elspeth Candlish Henderson, a WAAF NCO during the Battle of Britain
- William Hutt, Canadian actor.
- Fred 'Buck' Kite, the only British soldier to be awarded the MM and two Bars in the Second World War.
- Bob Lilley, founding member of the British Special Air Service, one of the "Tobruk Four".
- Tommy Prince, Devil's Brigade, Canada's most decorated aboriginal soldier of the Second World War, who also received the US Silver Star.
- Bob Quinn, leading Australian rules footballer.
- Wilfred Sénéchal, New Brunswick, Canada lawyer, politician.
- Karam Singh, Indian soldier later awarded the Param Vir Chakra, India's highest military decoration.
- Randall Swingler, British poet.

TSgt Streczyk awarded the British Military Medal by Field Marshal Montgomery in July 1944.

- Willie Thornton, Rangers and Scotland footballer.
- Berry Gazi, first Black South African to be awarded the Military Medal.
- Leslie "Bull" Allen, Australian stretcher bearer
- Philip Streczyk, highly decorated American Soldier from 1st Infantry Division, 16th Infantry Regiment; awarded for gallantry in action on Easy Red, Omaha Beach, Normandy during D-Day, June 6, 1944.

=== Post 1945 ===
- Ian Bailey, The Parachute Regiment, for actions in the Falklands War
- Robert Gaspare Consiglio, Special Air Service, killed in action during Bravo Two Zero patrol, Iraq 1991.
- Billy Hanna, Royal Ulster Rifles, for gallantry in the Korean War.
- Steven John Lane, Special Air Service, died during Bravo Two Zero patrol, Iraq 1991.
- John McAleese, British Special Air Service, for service in Ulster in 1987.
- Andy McNab (pseudonym), Special Air Service, for service in Ulster in 1979.
- Chris Ryan (pseudonym), Special Air Service, Bravo Two Zero patrol, Iraq 1991.
- Al Slater, Special Air Service, for service in Ulster.

== Popular culture ==
Jack Ford, a leading character in the BBC TV series When The Boat Comes In, is a First World War recipient of the Military Medal.

In the BBC series Peaky Blinders, the principal protagonist/antihero Thomas Michael Shelby is a recipient of the Distinguished Conduct Medal and the Military Medal for his service in the First World War, then post-war he was awarded the OBE by Winston Churchill.

In the Dad's Army episode "Branded", the platoon discover that the character Private Godfrey was a Conscientious Objector. He is then ostracized by the platoon, until they find that he was awarded the Military Medal in the First World War whilst serving in the Royal Army Medical Corps, for rescuing wounded men under enemy fire. The medal itself is central to the storyline in that it is higher than all the medals held by the rest of the platoon and is seen as a mark of true heroism which earns him great respect from them all.

In ANZAC Girls episode 6, "Courage", Sister Ross-King and three other nurses are awarded the Military Medal for bravery under fire.

In the video game Tom Clancy's Rainbow Six: Siege, the SAS character named Mike "Thatcher" Baker is seen wearing the Military Medal. The reason why it has been awarded to him is not mentioned.

== See also ==
- British and Commonwealth orders and decorations
- Military decoration
