= Queen Elisabeth Medal =

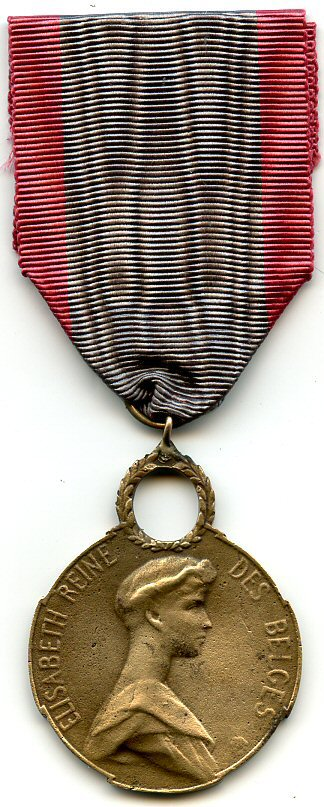
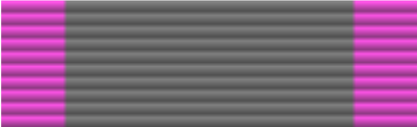
- Queen Elisabeth Medal (obverse) Ribbon bar
- Type: Wartime humanitarian award
- Awarded for: Humanitarian and medical care to Belgian victims of the First World War
- Presented by: Kingdom of Belgium
- Eligibility: Belgian citizens and foreign nationals
- Status: No longer awarded
- Established: 15 September 1915
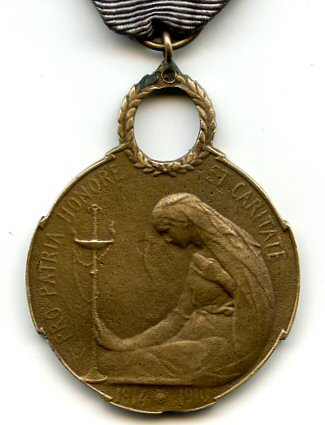
- Reverse of the medal

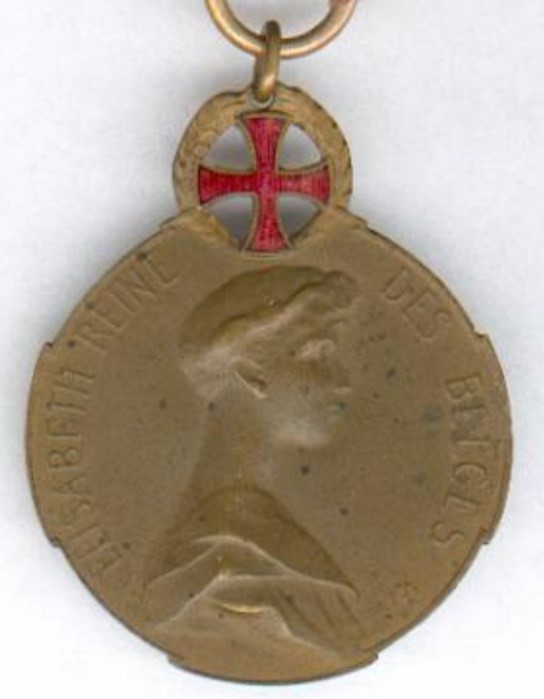
Awards for tending the wounded had a red enamelled cross in the wreath.

The Queen Elisabeth Medal (Dutch: Koningin Elisabeth Medaille, French: Médaille de la reine Élisabeth) was a Belgian decoration created by royal decree in October 1916 to recognise exceptional services to Belgium in the relief of the suffering of its citizens during the First World War. Its statute was ratified on 14 May 1919. It was awarded to people, both Belgians and foreign nationals, who, like Queen Elisabeth herself, had worked and cared for the suffering victims of war for a year or more prior to 10 September 1919. Although not limited to medical care of the sick and wounded, recipients who earned the medal by working in hospitals received a variant with a red enamelled cross within the suspension wreath. A great many Belgian and foreign doctors and nurses received the medal.

== Award description ==
The Queen Elisabeth Medal was a circular medal, 36 mm (1.4 in) in diameter, with four sections inset by 1 mm (0.039 in) giving it the slight outline of a cross. It had a slightly raised edge on both sides. The medal was struck in bronze but many recipients opted for silver or gilt silver variants.
Its obverse bore the relief right profile bust of Queen Elisabeth with the circular relief inscription "ÉLISABETH REINE DES BELGES" translating into "ELISABETH QUEEN OF THE BELGIANS".
The reverse bore the relief image of a nurse sitting and holding an oil lamp with the circular inscription in Latin "PRO PATRIA HONORE ET CARITATE" translating into "FOR COUNTRY HONOUR AND CHARITY". Below, the years "1914 - 1916" are inscribed.
At the top, a laurel wreath with a hollow centre served as the base for the suspension loop. Awards made for services to wounded or invalided soldiers incorporated a red enamelled cross within the wreath.

The medal was suspended by a ring through a suspension loop from a 38 mm (1.5 in) wide silk moiré ribbon with 6 mm (0.24 in) wide pink edge stripes.

== Recipients (partial list) ==
- Theodosia Bagot
- Dr Helen Boyle, served with Royal Free Hospital Unit in Serbia
- Constance Barbara Clarke, Lady Baird, serjeant with First Aid Nursing Yeomanry in World War I.
- Dr Mabel Jones
- Mairi Chisholm, served with Elsie Knocker as a nurse and ambulance driver on the Western Front in Belgium.
- Jeanne Corbes
- Mary J. Davies (née Brown) 1870 – 1918, Farndon, Chester
- Mary Emmott, Baroness Emmott of Oldham
- Myrtle Flower from Roma, Queensland, Australia
- Elsie Knocker, later Baroness de T'Serclaes, served with Mairi Chisholm as a nurse and ambulance driver on the Western Front in Belgium
- Hazel Marie Lane, née Wharton-Kirke
- Elizabeth Pinfold of Karori, Wellington, New Zealand
- Jane Runciman, of Dunedin, New Zealand
- Mary Downie Stewart, of Dunedin, New Zealand
- Emilie Blackmore Stapp for raising humanitarian aid to Belgium after World War I
- Henrietta Willmore from Queensland, Australia. Her medal, a handwritten note from the Belgian Minister of Foreign Affairs and a letter dated 5 January 1920 from the Belgian Vice Consul are held in collection of the State Library of Queensland.
- Awards were also made to regional committees in the UK including 5 members of the Belgian Relief Committee in Preston, Lancashire: Mrs Jamieson, Mrs Firth, Mrs Fitzherbert-Brockholes, Mrs Hayhurst and the Reverend Mother Superior of St Joseph's Orphanage and Hospital, Theatre Street, Preston. The medal awarded to Mrs Hayhurst is now in the collection of the Harris Museum.
- The Times Newspaper published news of awards to the National Belgian Relief Committee in London on 28 June 1918.
- Helen Rabagliati who was president of the Ilkley Ladies' Hospitality Committee
- Mary T. Wall (nee Lynch) of Halifax, N.S., Canada who was a Canadian Nursing Sister.
- Sister Mary Duggan (1856-1931), Superior of Hollymount (Sisters of Charity of Jesus & Mary), 'in recognition of the kind help and valuable assistance you have personally given to the Belgian refugees and the Belgian soldiers during the war.'
- Estella Cave, Countess Cave of Richmond

== See also ==
- Orders, decorations, and medals of Belgium

== Other sources ==
- Quinot H., 1950, Recueil illustré des décorations belges et congolaises, 4e Edition. (Hasselt)
- Cornet R., 1982, Recueil des dispositions légales et réglementaires régissant les ordres nationaux belges. 2e Ed. N.pl., (Brussels)
- Borné A.C., 1985, Distinctions honorifiques de la Belgique, 1830-1985 (Brussels)
- Captain H. Taprell Dorling, 1956, Ribbons and Medals, page 178 (A.H.Baldwin & Sons, London)
