= Lady Dorothie Feilding =

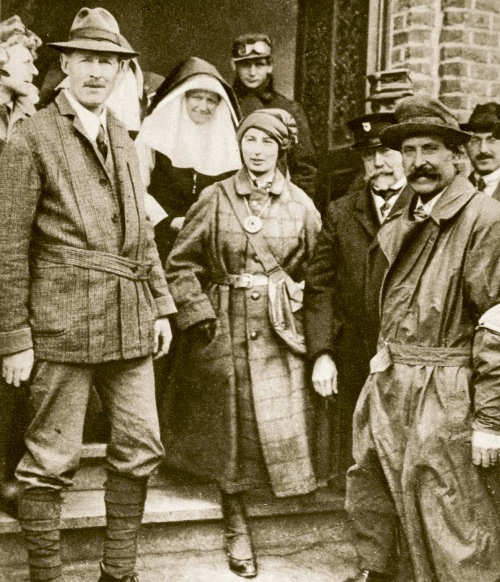
- Recently decorated with the Order of Léopold II: from The Illustrated War News, February 1915
- Born: Lady Dorothie Mary Evelyn Feilding; 6 October 1889; Newnham Paddox, Warwickshire, England
- Died: 24 October 1935 (aged 46); Mooresfort House, County Tipperary, Ireland
- Education: Convent of the Assumption, Paris
- Years active: September 1914 – June 1917
- Known for: being the first woman to be awarded the: Military Medal (1916); Also received: 1914 Star; British War Medal; Victory Medal; Croix de Guerre (1915); Order of Leopold II (1915)
- Spouse(s): Captain Charles Joseph Henry O'Hara Moore, MC (m. 1917)
- Relatives: Rudolph Feilding, 9th Earl of Denbigh; Henry Fielding
- Medical career
- Profession: Nurse, ambulance driver
- Institutions: Rugby Hospital; Munro Ambulance Corps

Lady Dorothie Mary Evelyn Feilding-Moore, MM (6 October 1889 – 24 October 1935) was a British heiress who became a highly decorated volunteer nurse and ambulance driver on the Western Front during World War I. She was the first woman to be awarded the Military Medal for bravery in the field. She also received the 1914 Star, the Croix de Guerre from the French and the Order of Leopold II from the Belgians for services to their wounded.

== Early life ==
Born on 6 October 1889 to Rudolph Feilding, 9th Earl of Denbigh and the Countess of Denbigh, Cecilia Mary Feilding (née Clifford), Dorothie was one of ten children, three boys and seven girls, and a distant relative of Henry Fielding, author of Tom Jones.

As a child she was educated at home at Newnham Paddox, Monks Kirby, Warwickshire, and at the Convent of the Assumption in Paris, where she became fluent in French. She made her debut in May 1908 at the age of 18, being presented to the King and Queen of the United Kingdom by her mother.

== World War I ==
Like many of her siblings, Feilding felt the need to do her part when war broke out. Three of her sisters, Lady Clare, Lady Elizabeth ("Bettie"), and Lady Victoria, would serve, as well as three brothers: Major Rudolph, Viscount Feilding, Coldstream Guards, who survived the war; Lieutenant-Commander the Hon. Hugh Feilding, Royal Navy, killed in action on 31 May 1916 at the Battle of Jutland; and Captain the Hon. Henry Feilding, also Coldstream Guards, who would die on 9 October 1917 from wounds received in action in Flanders just three months after his sister had left.

In September 1914, after a short training course at Rugby Hospital, Feilding travelled to the Western Front in Belgium where she began driving ambulances for the Munro Ambulance Corps (founded by Dr Hector Munro), an all-volunteer unit which included Elsie Knocker and Mairi Chisholm. This corps, comprising a convoy of motor ambulances donated by the British Red Cross, consisted of transporting wounded men from front line positions between Nieuwpoort and Diksmuide to the hospitals at Veurne.

Although from a privileged background, Feilding had an easy demeanour that transcended social boundaries, one that endeared her to all that she came into contact with, whether royalty or the ordinary fighting man. It was reported that her "five o'clock teas" among the ruins of Furnes gained great fame among the Belgian officers and enlisted men stationed there.

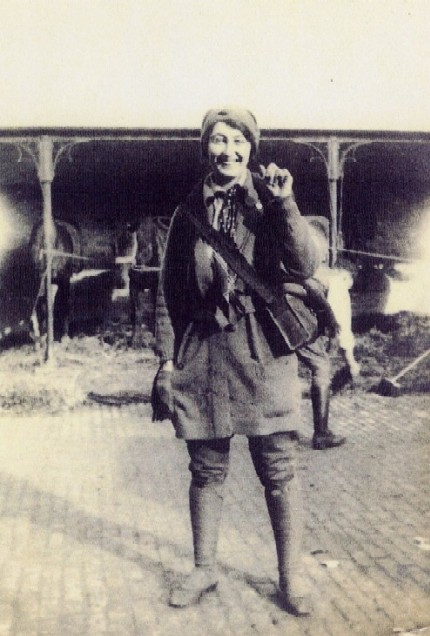
Photograph of Feilding in the courtyard of the school in Veurne (Furnes) turned into a military hospital; the horses are part of a Belgian ambulance cart, end of October 1914

Her heroism was such that her ambulance work at Diksmuide was recognised in a 'special order of the day' issued on 31 December 1914 by French Rear-Admiral Pierre Ronarc'h, commanding the Fusiliers Marins for which she subsequently received the French Croix de Guerre (bronze star). In 1916, Commander Henry Crosby Halahan, RN, Officer Commanding Royal Naval Siege Guns, wrote the following letter of recommendation to Prince Alexander of Teck, head of the British Military Mission in Belgium:

I venture to submit that Lady Dorothie Feilding should in like manner be rewarded. The circumstances are peculiar in that, this being an isolated Unit, no Medical organization existed for clearing casualties other than this voluntary one and owing to indifferent means of communication etc, it was necessary for the Ambulance to be in close touch with the guns when in action. (She) was thus frequently exposed to risks which probably no other woman has undergone. She has always displayed a devotion to duty and contempt of danger which has been a source of admiration to all. I speak only of her work with the Naval Siege Guns, but your Serene Highness is also aware of her devoted services to the Belgian Army and to the French – notably to the Brigade des Marins.

This citation ultimately resulted in Feilding becoming the first woman awarded the Military Medal for bravery on 1 September 1916 as notified in the London Gazette.

Five days later she was decorated with the medal by King George V himself at Windsor Castle. She was also decorated by King Albert I of Belgium with the Order of Leopold II, Knights Cross (with palm) for service to his country's wounded. In her letters, which she wrote home to Newnham Paddox almost daily, Feilding would reflect on the tragedy and horror of war and also the problems of being a woman at the front contending with gossip, shells, funding, lice (which forced many of the nurses to cut their hair short), vehicle maintenance and inconvenient marriage proposals. After two years at the front she began to look pale and tired.

She served with the corps in Flanders until June 1917 when she returned home to get married. On 5 July 1917, Feilding wed Captain Charles Joseph Henry O'Hara Moore, MC, of Mooresfort, County Tipperary. She moved to Warley, Middlesex where her husband was stationed in the 2nd battalion, Irish Guards. After a brief honeymoon period, Feilding was back behind the wheel of an ambulance, ferrying the wounded around London.

== Post-War years ==
After the war, the couple lived most of the year at his ancestral home, Mooresfort House in South Tipperary. They had four daughters (Ruth Mary, Celia Mary, Edith Mary O'Hara and June Mary Katherine) and one son (Arthur John Dudley). Feilding became an active member of the British Legion as well as being President of the Tipperary Jubilee Nursing Association and the local Agricultural show Society. She had always been a keen huntswoman and this continued in Ireland where she was a regular feature at hunt meets, especially the Scarteen Hunt. In 1935, the Irish Times stated she had been "prominently associated with the Scarteen Hunt to the success of which her great organizing powers in no small degree contributed."

In no small measure, these powers had been honed during her time with the Munro Corps. Her husband had a stud at Mooresfort and the couple regularly attended race meetings in Ireland and England.

== Death ==
Lady Dorothy died of heart failure in County Tipperary on 24 October 1935 at the age of 46. She was brought back home to Warwickshire and buried on 27 October in the family plot at the Monks Kirby Roman Catholic cemetery.

== Awards and decorations ==
Military Medal
1914 Star
British War Medal
Victory Medal
Knight of the Order of Léopold II with Palm
French Croix de Guerre

== See also ==
- Elsie Knocker
- Mairi Chisholm
- May Sinclair
- Albert I of Belgium
- Alexander Cambridge, 1st Earl of Athlone
- Western Front

== Bibliography ==
- Atkinson, Diane. Elsie and Mairi Go to War: Two Extraordinary Women on the Western Front. Cornerstone. (2009)
- Hallam, Andrew & Nicola. Lady Under Fire on the Western Front: The Great War Letters of Lady Dorothie Feilding MM. Pen & Sword Military. (2010)
- Mitton, Geraldine Edith, T'Sercles, Baroness Elsie, Chisholm, Mairi. The Cellar-House of Pervyse : A Tale of Uncommon Things from the Journals and Letters of the Baroness T'Serclaes and Mairi Chisholm. A.C. Black. (1917)
- T'Serclaes, Elsie Baroness de. Flanders and Other Fields. Harrap. (1964)
- Vanleene, Patrick. Op Naar de Grote Oorlog. Mairi, Elsie en de anderen in Flanders Fields. De Klaproos (2001)
- Vanleene, Patrick. Fearless: Dorothie Feilding's War, 1914–1917. Academia Press/Lannoo (2015)
- White, Sally. Ordinary Heroes. Amberley Publishing (2018)
