= Munro Ambulance Corps =

The mission of the Munro Ambulance Corps was to move wounded troops from the Western Front to hospitals in Flanders during World War I. It was founded in August 1914 by Hector Munro, who was one of the directors of the Medico-Psychological Clinic in London. The force’s effective operation was hampered by the chaotic nature of the fighting, a lack of funds and logistics, poor coordination and internal disputes.

Some of the notable members of the corps were the British writer May Sinclair, the British heiress Lady Dorothie Feilding, and the nurses Elsie Knocker and Mairi Chisholm (The Madonnas of Pervijze). The ladies were not particularly welcome in the predominantly male teams; they had disputes amongst themselves and with their superiors, and were not always able – or allowed – to carry out their duties as they would have wished. Sinclair was sent back to England against her will following the fall of Antwerp, whilst Knocker and Chisholm set up a nursing post in Pervijze because they felt they could be of greater use there. Sinclair wrote about these conflicts and the difficult and unresolved circumstances of the war in her many post-war works.
