= Mairi Chisholm =

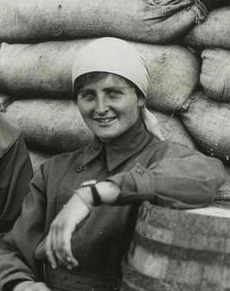
- Born: Mairi Lambert Gooden Chisholm; 26 February 1896; Datchet, England
- Died: 22 August 1981 (aged 85); Perth, Scotland
- Years active: 1914–1918
- Medical career
- Profession: Nurse
- Awards: Order of Léopold II (1915); Queen Elisabeth Medal (1915); Military Medal (1917); 1914 Star (1917); Order of St. John of Jerusalem (1918)

Mairi Lambert Gooden Chisholm, of Chisholm, MM, OStJ (26 February 1896 – 22 August 1981) was a Scottish nurse and ambulance driver in the First World War. She, together with her friend Elsie Knocker, won numerous medals for bravery and for saving the lives of thousands of soldiers on the Western Front in Belgium. Dubbed "The Madonnas of Pervyse" by the press the two were among the most photographed women of the war.

== Early life ==
Chisholm was born on 26 February 1896 in Buckinghamshire to Captain Roderick Gooden-Chisholm, Chief of Clan Chisholm, and Margaret Fraser. Her family was independently wealthy and owned a plantation in Trinidad. As a teen, she witnessed her older brother, Uailean, who owned a Royal Enfield 425cc motorcycle, competing at rallies and at the Bournemouth speed trials. Around this time, and against his wife's wishes, her father bought her a Douglas motorbike. Chisholm spent hours in the family stables stripping down the bikes and repairing them. She was just 18 years old when, while roaring round the Hampshire and Dorset lanes, she met thirty-year-old Elsie Knocker, a divorcee and mother of a young son. They became fast friends and soon began competing in motorcycle and sidecar trials together.

== World War I ==
When war was declared in 1914, Knocker wrote to Chisholm that there was "work to be done", and suggested they go to London to become dispatch riders for the Women's Emergency Corps.

Chisholm rode her motorbike all the way from Dorset to the capital. It was while acting as a courier in this way that she was spotted making hairpin corners in the city by Dr Hector Munro. Munro was setting up a Flying Ambulance Corps to help the Belgians who had been caught unawares by the German invasion and invited her to join his team, as she describes in a June 1976 interview: "[Munro] was deeply impressed with my ability to ride through the traffic. He traced me to the Women's Emergency Corps and... said, 'Would you like to go out to Flanders' and I said 'Yes, I'd love to'."

Both she and Knocker ended up in Belgium as part of the corps which included Lady Dorothie Feilding and May Sinclair. Initially quartered at Ghent, the unit relocated to Veurne at the end of October where the women worked tirelessly, picking up wounded soldiers mid-way from the front and transporting them back to their field hospital at the rear. After the beds ran out, the wounded were laid on the floor or propped up against the wall. As the dead piled up, the two nurses were told to remove them to the mortuary. Chisholm wrote in her diary: "No one can understand ... unless one has seen the rows of dead men laid out. One sees men with their jaws blown off, arms and legs mutilated."

Chisholm and Knocker soon came to the conclusion that they could save more lives by treating the wounded directly on the front lines. In November, they decided to leave the corps and set up their own dressing station five miles east in a town named Pervijze, north of Ypres, just one hundred yards from the trenches. Here, in a vacant cellar which they named "Poste de Secours Anglais" ("British First Aid Post"), the two would spend the next three and a half years tending to the wounded. No longer affiliated with the Belgian Red Cross, they began acting completely as free agents and had to support their work by raising their own funds. Through sheer perseverance Knocker was able to arrange for the two of them to be officially seconded to the Belgian garrison stationed there. In January 1915, they were both decorated by King Albert I of Belgium with the Order of Léopold II, Knights Cross (with palm) for their courageous work on the front lines.

They were also awarded the British Military Medal and both made Officers of the Most Venerable Order of St. John of Jerusalem. Chisholm was also decorated with the Queen Elisabeth Medal of Belgium and the British campaign medals, including the 1914 Star.

In 1916, Chisholm became engaged to a Royal Naval Air pilot named Jack Petrie, who died a year later during flying practice. In 1918, both women were badly affected by a massive bombing raid and gas attacks on their makeshift field hospital. Chisholm recovered enough to return to the front, before being forced to abandon her post just months before the end of the war. She returned to Britain, where both she and Knocker saw out the rest of the war as members of the newly formed Women's Royal Air Force.

== Post-war years ==
Following the end of the war, the two nurses continued to be feted by the public and the press. Eventually they went their separate ways when Chisholm learned the truth about Knocker's divorce from her first husband; since Edwardian English society frowned upon divorce, Knocker had previously maintained the fiction that she was a widow. The two barely spoke again. The war had taken its toll on Chisholm's health. She had been poisoned, contracted septicaemia, and had a weak heart.

She did, however, continue to live her life at a fast pace. After her brief stint in the WRAF, she took up motor racing. On one occasion, she was scheduled to take part in a race at Brooklands but had to withdraw because of a fainting episode the evening before.

== Final years of and death ==
Partly on doctors' advice, Chisholm returned to Nairn, where, it was hoped, she would lead a quieter life. There she became a successful poultry breeder with her childhood friend, May Davidson on the Davidson's family estate. In the 1930s they relocated their business to Jersey.

Her final move was to Cnoc an Fhurain, Rhugarbh, Barcaldine, Argyll, where she, May, "Bird" Partridge and "John" Johnstone, ran a poultry farm for decades. In her later years she spent much time corresponding with The Clan Chisholm Society, which she established in 1972.

Mairi Chisholm died on 22 August 1981 of lung cancer, aged 85, in Perth Hospital.

== Awards and decorations ==
Officer of the Order of St. John of Jerusalem
Military Medal
1914 Star
British War Medal
Victory Medal
Knights Cross of the Order of Léopold II with palm
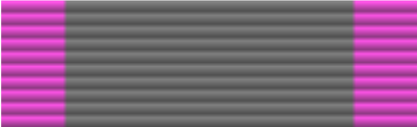
Belgian Queen Elisabeth Medal

== Papers and archives ==
National Library of Scotland holds five volumes of papers and photographs that belonged to Chisholm. The photographs are a valued source of information as they give a candid portrayal of the wartime experiences of Chisholm and Knocker in contrast to the official photos of the period, which tend to avoid scenes that might challenge the 'official' account of the war.

The Imperial War Museum holds Chisholm's diaries along with recordings and transcripts of interviews.

== Memorials ==
In November 2014 a statue of Chisholm and Elsie Knocker was unveiled in the garden of the Hotel Ariane in Ypres, Belgium.

== Gallery ==
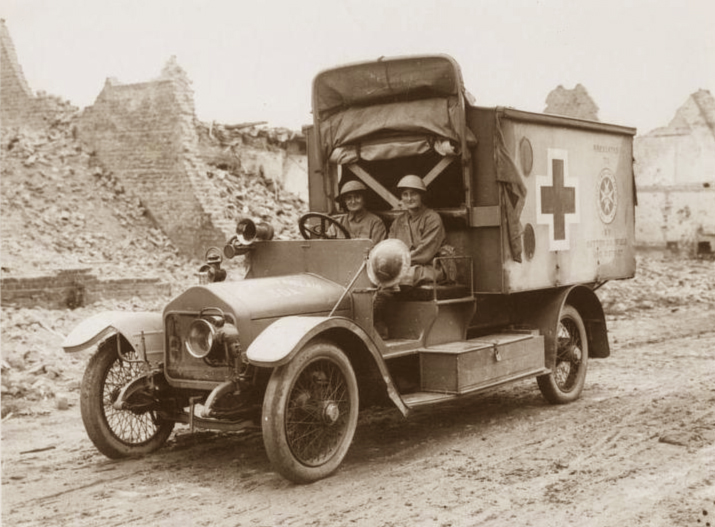
Knocker and Chisholm in their converted Wolseley Ambulance, Pervyse, Belgium, c. 1916

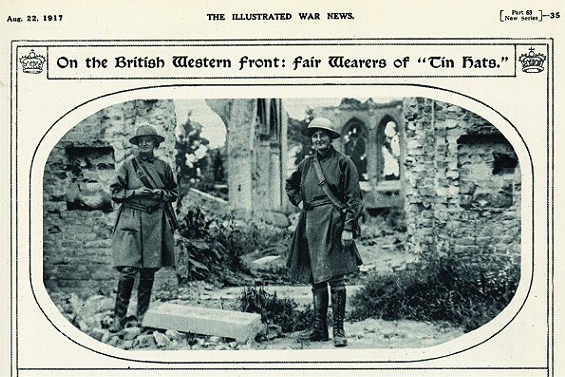
Knocker and Chisholm pose in the ruins of a church in Pervyse, Belgium for "Illustrated War News", 22 April 1917

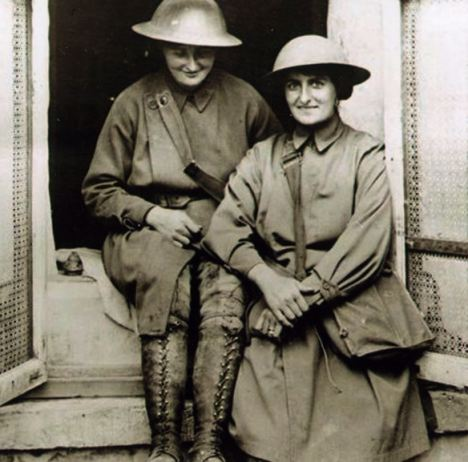
Chisholm and Knocker wearing their Tommy helmets. Pervyse, Belgium, c. 1917

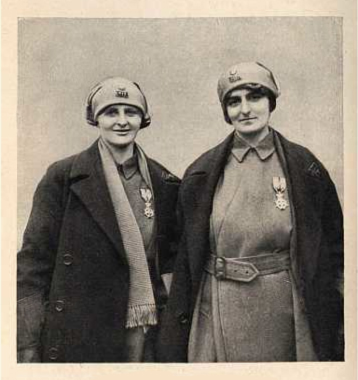
Chisholm and Knocker display their Order of Léopold II, medals. On their headscarves is the insignia of the Belgian Army's 3rd Division, c. 1918

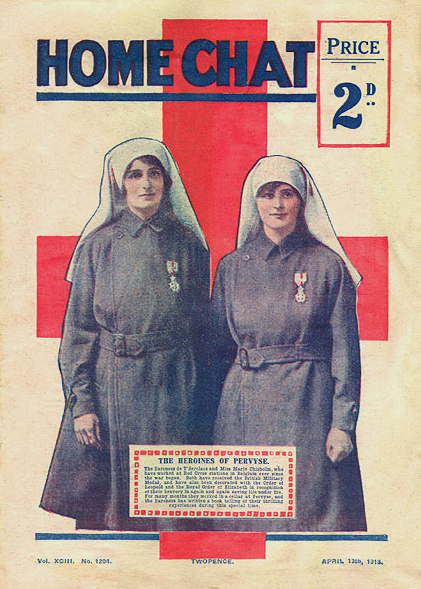
Knocker and Chisholm on the cover of "Home Chat" magazine, 11 April 1918

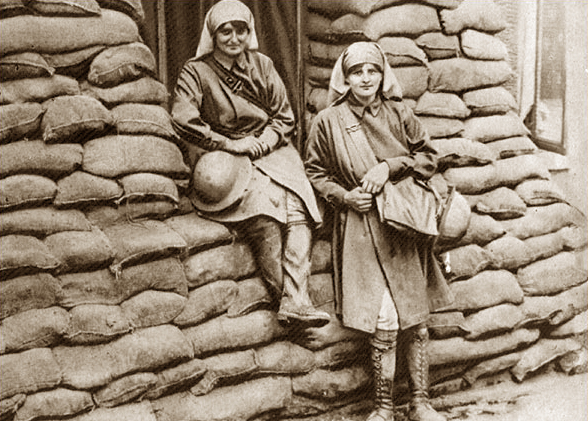
Knocker and Chisholm outside their advanced dressing station, Pervyse, Belgium, c. 1918

== See also ==
- Queen Elisabeth of Belgium
- Alexander Cambridge, 1st Earl of Athlone

== Bibliography ==
- Atkinson, Diane. Elsie and Mairi Go to War: Two Extraordinary Women on the Western Front. Cornerstone. (2009)
- Hallam, Andrew & Nicola. Lady Under Fire on the Western Front: The Great War Letters of Lady Dorothie Feilding MM. Pen & Sword Military. (2010)
- Mitton, Geraldine Edith, T'Serclaes, Baroness Elsie de, Chisholm, Mairi. The Cellar-House of Pervyse : A Tale of Uncommon Things from the Journals and Letters of the Baroness T'Serclaes and Mairi Chisholm. A.C. Black. (1917)
- T'Serclaes, Elsie Baroness de. Flanders and Other Fields. Harrap. (1964)
