= May Sinclair =

English writer and suffragist (1863–1946)

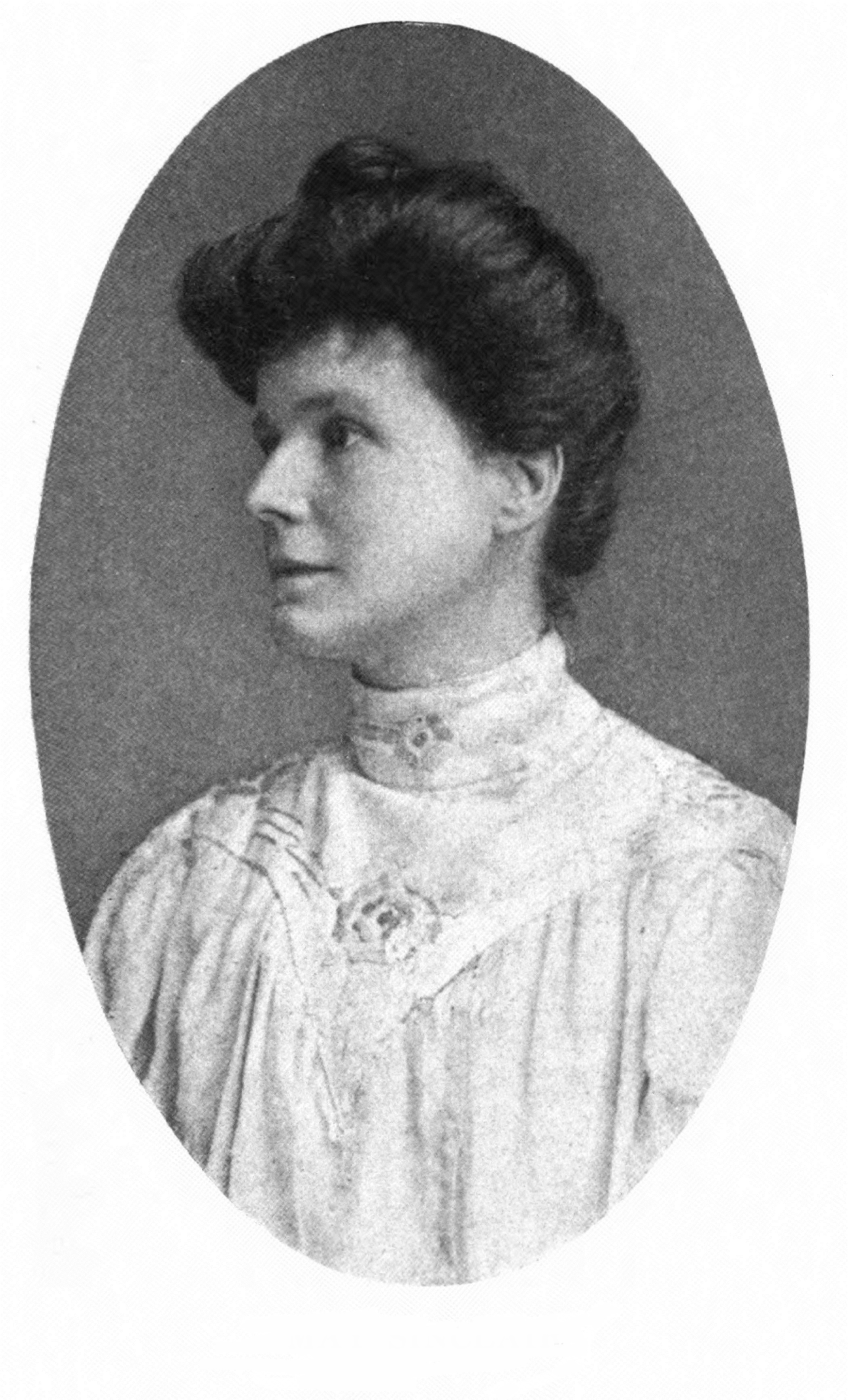
- May Sinclair c. 1912
- Born: Mary Amelia St. Clair; 24 August 1863; Rock Ferry, Cheshire, England
- Died: 14 November 1946 (aged 83); Bierton, Buckinghamshire, England
- Occupations: Novelist and poet
- Military career
- Branch: Wellington House; Belgian Red Cross
- Unit: Munro Ambulance Corps
- Conflicts: World War I; Belgium in World War I

May Sinclair was the pseudonym of Mary Amelia St. Clair (24 August 1863 – 14 November 1946), a British writer who wrote about two dozen novels, short stories and poetry. She was an active suffragist, and member of the Woman Writers' Suffrage League. She once dressed up as a demure, rebel Jane Austen for a suffrage fundraising event. Sinclair was also a significant critic in the area of modernist poetry and prose, and she is attributed with first using the term 'stream of consciousness' in a literary context, when reviewing the first volumes of Dorothy Richardson's novel sequence Pilgrimage (1915–1967), in The Egoist, April 1918. She is known for her novels Life and Death of Harriett Frean (1922) and Arnold Waterlow: a Life (1924).

== Early life ==
Sinclair was born in Rock Ferry, Cheshire. Her mother, Amelia Sinclair, was strict and religious; her father, William Sinclair, was a Liverpool shipowner, who went bankrupt when Sinclair was seven years old and became an alcoholic. Her parents separated and Sinclair lived with her mother, moving around and relying on the help of relatives. At 18 years old, Sinclair was enrolled at Cheltenham Ladies College, but her mother took her out after one year. She became obliged to look after her brothers, as four of the five, all older than she, were suffering from fatal congenital heart disease.

== Career ==
From 1896 Sinclair wrote professionally to support herself and her mother, who died in 1901. An active feminist, Sinclair treated a number of themes relating to the position of women and marriage. Her works sold well in the United States.

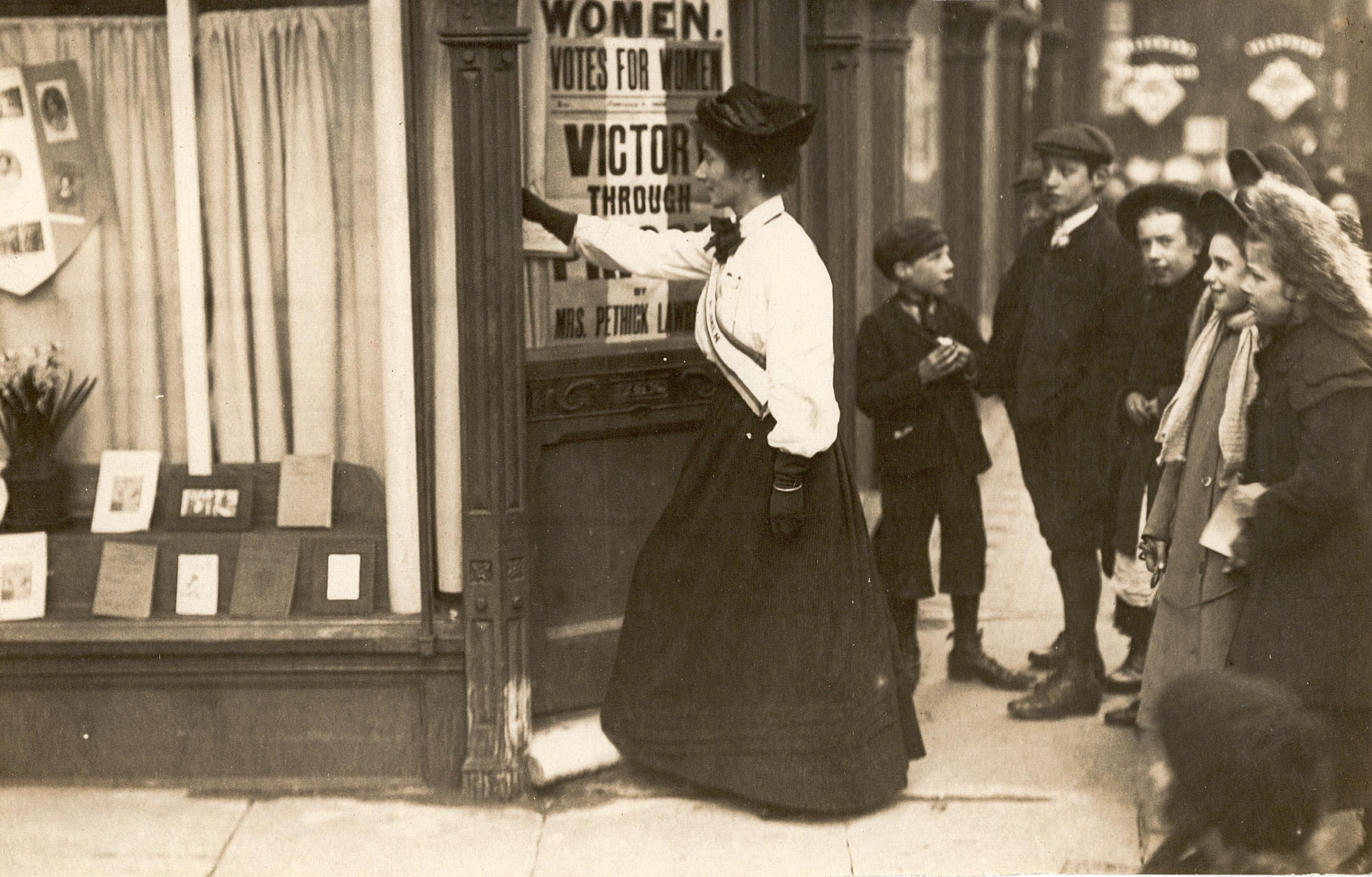
Ma(r)y Sinclair entering Kensington's Women's Social & Political Union shop in 1910

Sinclair's suffrage activities were remembered by Sylvia Pankhurst. Photographs (as "Mary Sinclair") show her around the WSPU offices in Kensington. In 1912 the Women Writers' Suffrage League published her ideas on feminism. Here she debunked theories put forward by Sir Almroth Wright that the suffragists were powered by their sexual frustration because of the shortage of men. She said that suffrage and the class struggle were similar aspirations and the working woman should not be in competition with the ambitions of the male working class.

Around 1913, she was a founding supporter of the Medico-Psychological Clinic in London which was run by Dr Jessie Murray. Sinclair became interested in psychoanalytic thought, and introduced matter related to Sigmund Freud's teaching in her novels. In 1914, she volunteered to join the Munro Ambulance Corps, a charitable organization (which included Lady Dorothie Feilding, Elsie Knocker and Mairi Chisholm) that aided wounded Belgian soldiers on the Western Front in Flanders. She was sent home after only a few weeks at the front; she wrote about the experience in both prose and poetry.

Her 1913 novel The Combined Maze, the story of a London clerk and the two women he loves, was highly praised by critics, including George Orwell, while Agatha Christie considered it "one of the best novels ever written".

She wrote early criticism on Imagism and the poet H. D. (1915 in The Egoist); she was on social terms with H. D. (Hilda Doolittle), Richard Aldington and Ezra Pound at the time. She also reviewed in a positive light the poetry of T. S. Eliot (1917 in the Little Review) and the fiction of Dorothy Richardson (1918 in The Egoist). Some aspects of Sinclair's subsequent novels have been traced as influenced by modernist techniques, particularly in the autobiographical Mary Olivier: A Life (1919). She was included in the 1925 Contact Collection of Contemporary Writers.

Sinclair wrote two volumes of supernatural fiction, Uncanny Stories (1923) and The Intercessor and Other Stories (1931). E. F. Bleiler called Sinclair "an underrated writer" and described Uncanny Stories as "excellent". Gary Crawford has stated Sinclair's contribution to the supernatural fiction genre, "small as it is, is notable". Jacques Barzun included Sinclair among a list of supernatural fiction writers that "one should make a point of seeking out". Brian Stableford has stated that Sinclair's "supernatural tales are written with uncommon delicacy and precision, and they are among the most effective examples of their fugitive kind". Andrew Smith has described Uncanny Stories as "an important contribution to the ghost story".

American critic Dorothy Parker chastised Sinclair for producing books "with one hand tied behind her and a buttered crumpet in the other."

From the late 1920s, she was suffering from the early signs of Parkinson's disease, and ceased writing. She settled with a companion in Buckinghamshire in 1932. She died on 14 November 1946.

She is buried at St John-at-Hampstead's churchyard, London.

== Philosophy ==
Sinclair also wrote non-fiction based on studies of philosophy, particularly idealism. She defended a form of idealistic monism in her book A Defence of Idealism (1917).

Sinclair was interested in parapsychology and spiritualism, she was a member of the Society for Psychical Research from 1914.

== Works ==
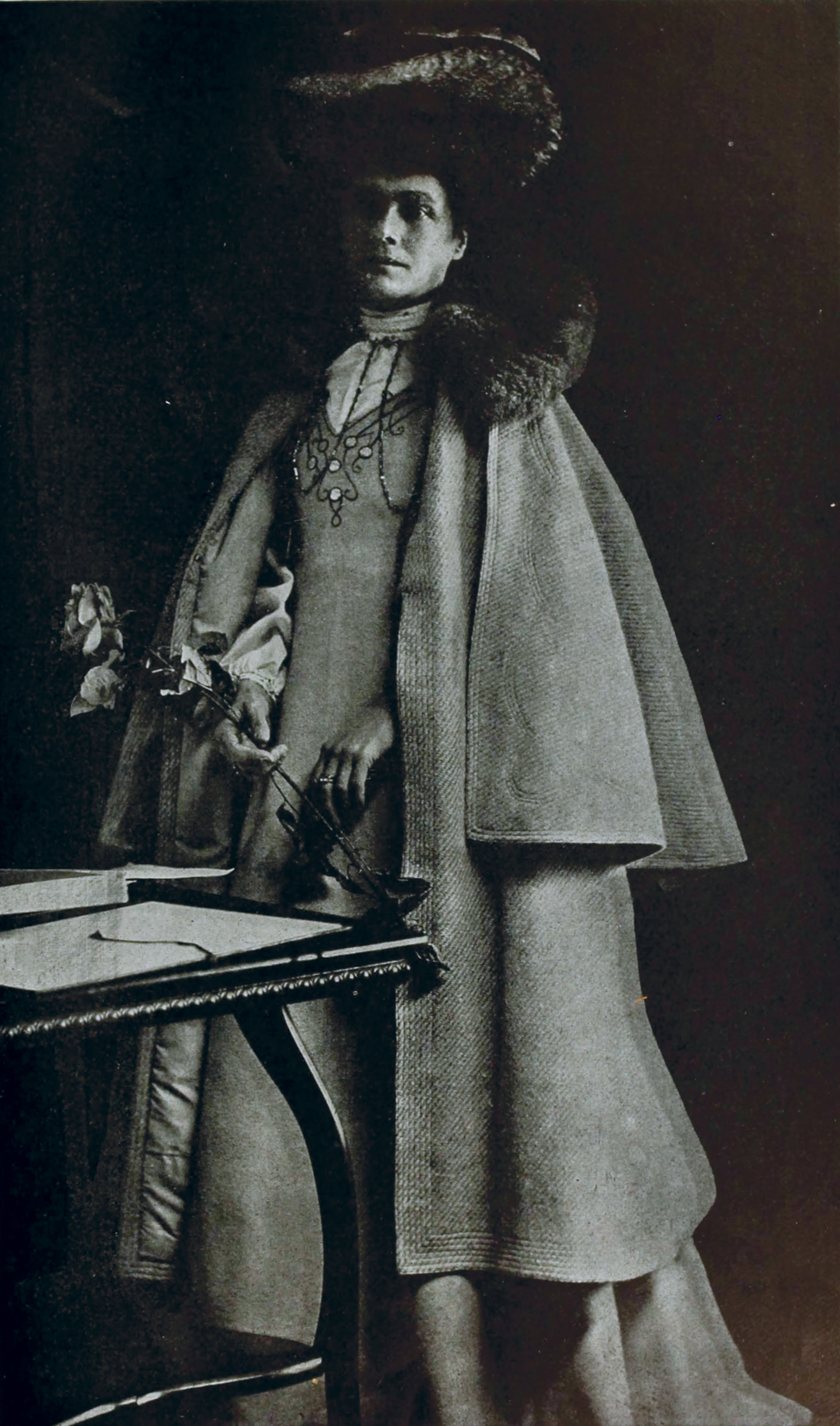
Portrait of May Sinclair by E. Huggins

- Nakiketas and other poems (1886) as Julian Sinclair
- Essays in Verse (1892)
- Audrey Craven (1897)
- Mr and Mrs Nevill Tyson (1898) also The Tysons
- Two Sides Of A Question (1901)
- The Divine Fire (1904)
- The Helpmate (1907)
- The Judgment of Eve (1907) stories
- The Immortal Moment (1908)
- Kitty Tailleur (1908)
- Outlines of Church History by Rudolph Sohm (1909) translator
- The Creators (1910)
- Miss Tarrant's Temperament (1911) in Harper's Magazine
- The Flaw in the Crystal (1912)
- The Three Brontes (1912)
- Feminism (1912) pamphlet for Women's Suffrage League
- The Combined Maze (1913)
- The Three Sisters (1914)
- The Return of the Prodigal (1914)
- A Journal of Impressions in Belgium (1915)
- The Belfry (1916)
- Tasker Jevons: The Real Story (1916)
- The Tree of Heaven (1917)
- A Defence of Idealism: Some Questions & Conclusions (1917)
- Mary Olivier: A Life (1919)
- The Romantic (1920)
- Mr. Waddington of Wyck (1921)
- Life and Death of Harriett Frean (1922)
- Anne Severn and the Fieldings (1922)
- The New Idealism (1922)
- Uncanny Stories (1923)
- A Cure of Souls (1924)
- The Dark Night: A Novel in Unrhymed Verse (1924)
- Arnold Waterlow (1924)
- The Rector of Wyck (1925)
- Far End (1926)
- The Allinghams (1927)
- History of Anthony Waring (1927)
- Fame (1929)
- Tales Told by Simpson (1930) stories
- The Intercessor, and Other Stories (1931)
- Villa Désirée (1932)

== Sources ==
- Theophilus Ernest Martin Boll (1973) Miss May Sinclair: Novelist; A Biographical and Critical Introduction
- Suzanne Raitt (2000) May Sinclair: A Modern Victorian
- George M. Johnson (2006) "May Sinclair: The Evolution of a Psychological Novelist" in Dynamic Psychology in Modern British Fiction. Palgrave Macmillan, 2006. pp. 101–143.
