= Jane Runciman =

New Zealand tailoress, union official, social reformer

Jane Elizabeth Runciman (4 June 1873 – 13 November 1950), known as "Jeannie" to close friends and family, was a notable New Zealand tailor, union official and social reformer. She was born in Waterford, County Waterford, Ireland in 1873.

Runciman was one of the first women in New Zealand to be appointed as a justice of the peace. In 1916, she was awarded the Médaille de la Reine Elisabeth (Queen Elisabeth Medal) for her efforts raising money for the Belgian Relief Fund during World War I.
