= Life and Death of Harriett Frean =

1922 novel by May Sinclair

- First edition
- Author: May Sinclair
- Genre: Fiction
- Publisher: Macmillan
- Publication date: 1922
- Publication place: United Kingdom
- Media type: Print (Paperback)
- Pages: 376 pp

The Life and Death of Harriett Frean' is a 1922 novel by English author May Sinclair.

== Plot ==
Harriett Frean is a woman so afraid of life that she will eventually talk herself out of living it. The novel follows Harriet as she is raised to be the ideal Victorian woman. Harriett is proud of her self-sacrifice (which she believes is the highest love of all) but when she falls in love with her best friend's fiancé she is forced to question everything she thought she knew. Having decided not to follow her heart Harriett spends the rest of her life trying to convince herself that she has done the right thing. Described as a "small, perfect gem of a book" by author Jonathan Coe.

== The history of the novel ==
The Life and Death of Harriett Frean was first published in 1922. It was republished by Virago in 1980, by Penguin Books in 1986 and has been reprinted many times.
