= List of cemeteries in Belgium =

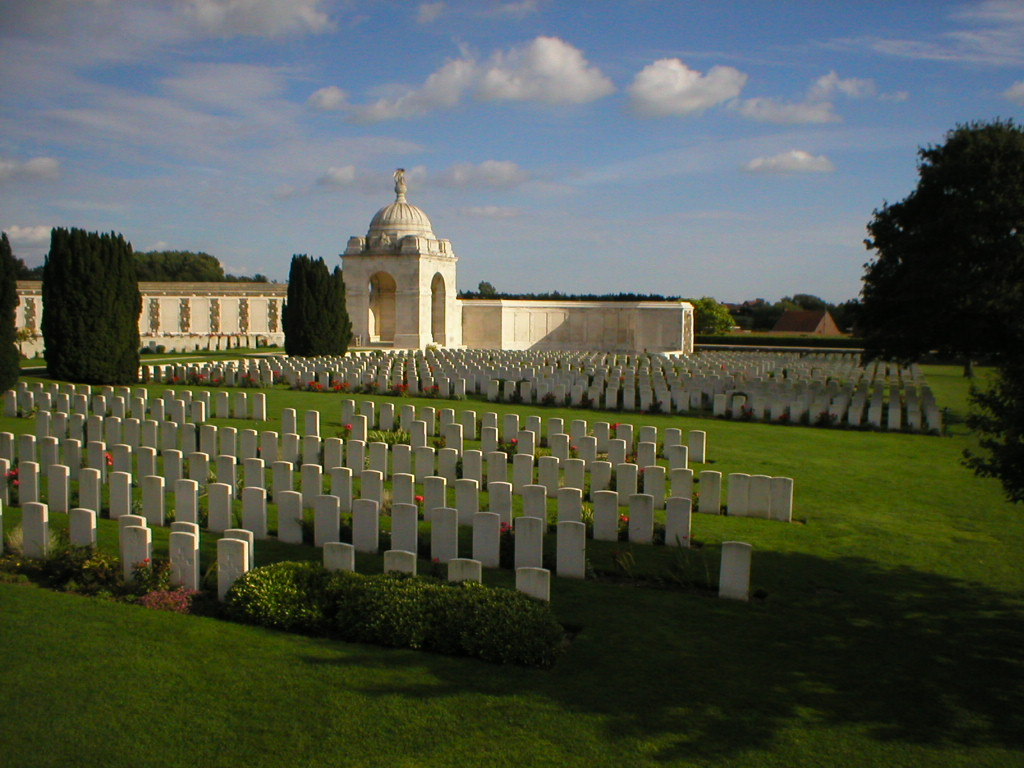
The British Commonwealth Tyne Cot cemetery

Cemeteries in Belgium both civil and military.

== Civil cemeteries ==
- Anderlecht Cemetery
- Arlon Cemetery
- Brussels Cemetery (also large military section)
- Campo Santo (Sint Amandsberg near Gent)
- Ixelles Cemetery
- Laeken Cemetery
- Molenbeek-Saint-Jean Cemetery
- Saint-Josse-ten-Noode Cemetery
- Schaerbeek Cemetery
- Schoonselhof Cemetery (also large military section)

== Belgian military ==
- De Panne war cemetery
- Adinkerke war cemetery
- Keiem war cemetery
- Houthulst war cemetery
- Ramskapelle war cemetery
- Steenkerke war cemetery
- Westvleteren war cemetery
- Leopoldsburg war cemetery
- Fort de Loncin
- Champion war cemetery
- Belgrade war cemetery
- Veltem war cemetery
- Hoogstade war cemetery
- Oeren war cemetery
- Bruges war cemetery

== German military ==
- Hooglede German war cemetery
- Langemark German war cemetery
- Lommel German war cemetery
- Menen German war cemetery
- Recogne German war cemetery
- Vladslo German war cemetery

== US military ==
- Ardennes American Cemetery and Memorial
- Flanders Field American Cemetery and Memorial
- Henri-Chapelle American Cemetery and Memorial

== French military ==
- Cimetière d'Anloy-Bruyères
- Cimetière de la Belle-Motte
- Cimetière de l'Orée de la Forêt
- Cimetière Virton Bellevue
- Chastre French war cemetery
- Dinant (Citadelle) French war cemetery
- Maissin War Cemetery (Luxemburg Province)
- Ossuaire Kemmelberg
- Saint-Charles de Potyze

== British (Commonwealth) military ==
- Artillery Wood Commonwealth War Graves Commission Cemetery
- Bard Cottage Commonwealth War Graves Commission Cemetery
- Bedford House Commonwealth War Graves Commission Cemetery
- Berks Commonwealth War Graves Commission Cemetery Extension
- Blauwepoort Farm Commonwealth War Graves Commission Cemetery
- Brandhoek Military Commonwealth War Graves Commission Cemetery
- Brandhoek New Military Commonwealth War Graves Commission Cemetery
- Brandhoek New Military Number 3 Commonwealth War Graves Commission Cemetery
- Buffs Road Commonwealth War Graves Commission Cemetery
- Buttes New British Cemetery (New Zealand) Memorial
- Chester Farm Commonwealth War Graves Commission Cemetery
- Dickebusch New Military Commonwealth War Graves Commission Cemetery and Extension
- Dickebusch Old Military Commonwealth War Graves Commission Cemetery
- Divisional Collecting Post Commonwealth War Graves Commission Cemetery and Extension
- Divisional Commonwealth War Graves Commission Cemetery
- Duhallow ADS Commonwealth War Graves Commission Cemetery
- Elzenwalle Brasserie Commonwealth War Graves Commission Cemetery
- Essex Farm Commonwealth War Graves Commission Cemetery
- First DCLI Commonwealth War Graves Commission Cemetery, The Bluff
- Hedge Row Trench Commonwealth War Graves Commission Cemetery
- Hooge Crater Commonwealth War Graves Commission Cemetery
- La Belle Alliance Commonwealth War Graves Commission Cemetery
- La Brique Military Commonwealth War Graves Commission Cemeteries
- Lancashire Cottage Commonwealth War Graves Commission Cemetery
- Larch Wood (Railway Cutting) Commonwealth War Graves Commission Cemetery
- Lone Tree Commonwealth War Graves Commission Cemetery
- Menin Road South Military Commonwealth War Graves Commission Cemetery
- Mud Corner Commonwealth War Graves Commission Cemetery
- New Irish Farm Commonwealth War Graves Commission Cemetery
- Oxford Road Commonwealth War Graves Commission Cemetery
- Perth (China Wall) Commonwealth War Graves Commission Cemetery
- Potijze Burial Ground Commonwealth War Graves Commission Cemetery
- Potijze Château Lawn and Grounds Commonwealth War Graves Commission Cemeteries
- Potijze Château Wood Commonwealth War Graves Commission Cemetery
- Railway Chateau Commonwealth War Graves Commission Cemetery
- Ramparts (Lille Gate) Commonwealth War Graves Commission Cemetery
- Ramscappelle Road Military Cemetery
- RE Grave Railway Wood Commonwealth War Graves Commission Cemetery
- Ridge Wood Military Commonwealth War Graves Commission Cemetery
- St Symphorien Military Cemetery
- Sanctuary Wood Commonwealth War Graves Commission Cemetery
- Spanbroekmolen British Commonwealth War Graves Commission Cemetery
- Spoilbank Commonwealth War Graves Commission Cemetery
- Suffolk Commonwealth War Graves Commission Cemetery
- Track "X" Commonwealth War Graves Commission Cemetery
- Tuileries British Commonwealth War Graves Commission Cemetery
- Tyne Cot Commonwealth War Graves Commission Cemetery
- Voormezeele Enclosures Commonwealth War Graves Commission Cemeteries
- White House Commonwealth War Graves Commission Cemetery
- Wieltje Farm Commonwealth War Graves Commission Cemetery
- Woods Commonwealth War Graves Commission Cemetery
- Ypres Reservoir Commonwealth War Graves Commission Cemetery
- Ypres Town Commonwealth War Graves Commission Cemetery and Extension
