= Molenbeek-Saint-Jean Cemetery =

Cemetery in Molenbeek, Belgium

- Cimetière de Molenbeek-Saint-Jean (French); Begraafplaats van Sint-Jans-Molenbeek (Dutch)
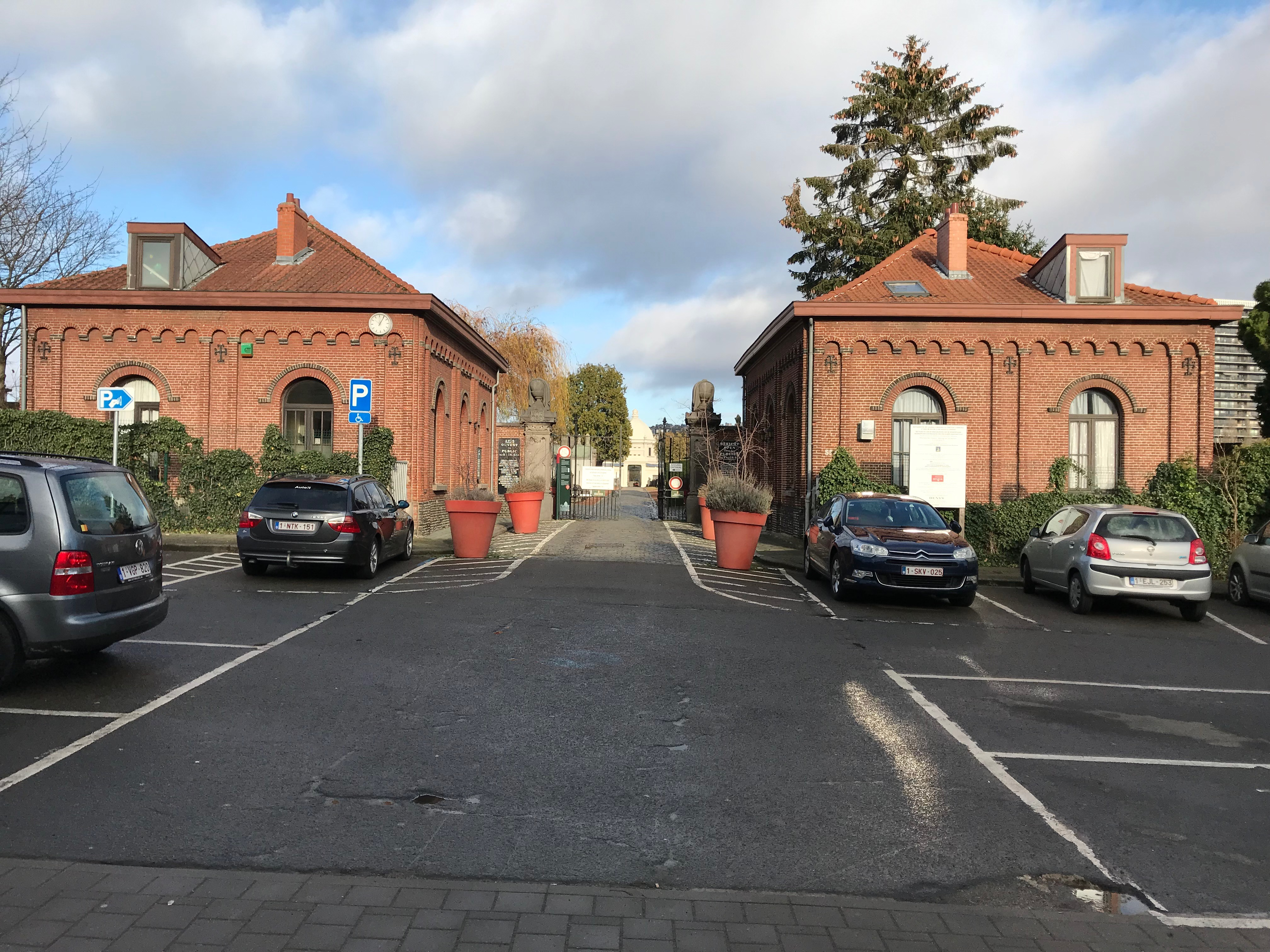
- Entrance of the cemetery
- Interactive map of Molenbeek-Saint-Jean Cemetery

Details
- Established: 16 August 1864
- Location: Molenbeek-Saint-Jean, Brussels-Capital Region
- Country: Belgium
- Coordinates: 50°51′40″N 4°18′39″E
- Type: Public, non-denominational
- Size: 1.5 hectares (3.7 acres)

Molenbeek-Saint-Jean Cemetery (French: Cimetière de Molenbeek-Saint-Jean; Dutch: Begraafplaats van Sint-Jans-Molenbeek) is a cemetery belonging to Molenbeek-Saint-Jean in Brussels, Belgium, where the municipality's inhabitants have the right to be buried. It is located at 539, chaussée de Gand/Gentsesteenweg, in the west of the municipality. The ensemble extends over 1.5 hectares (3.7 acres).

The cemetery was inaugurated on 16 August 1864 to replace the old parish cemetery around the Church of St. John the Baptist, which had become too small, and whose last remains were cleared in 1932. Nowadays, it concentrates a considerable protected heritage, including funeral galleries and a columbarium initially designed for Laeken Cemetery and built in 1880, as well as several chapels.

== Main sights ==
The cemetery contains fine examples of 19th-century funerary art. Examples include:

- the burial galleries and columbarium from 1880, spurred on by Émile Bockstael, after his earlier initiative at Laeken Cemetery
- the Art Nouveau funerary monument of the Des Cressonnières family by Victor Horta (1894)
- the tomb of the Beelaert family with a bronze sculpture by Amédée Hamoir
- the funerary monument of the Jean De Maerschalck family by Ernest Salu
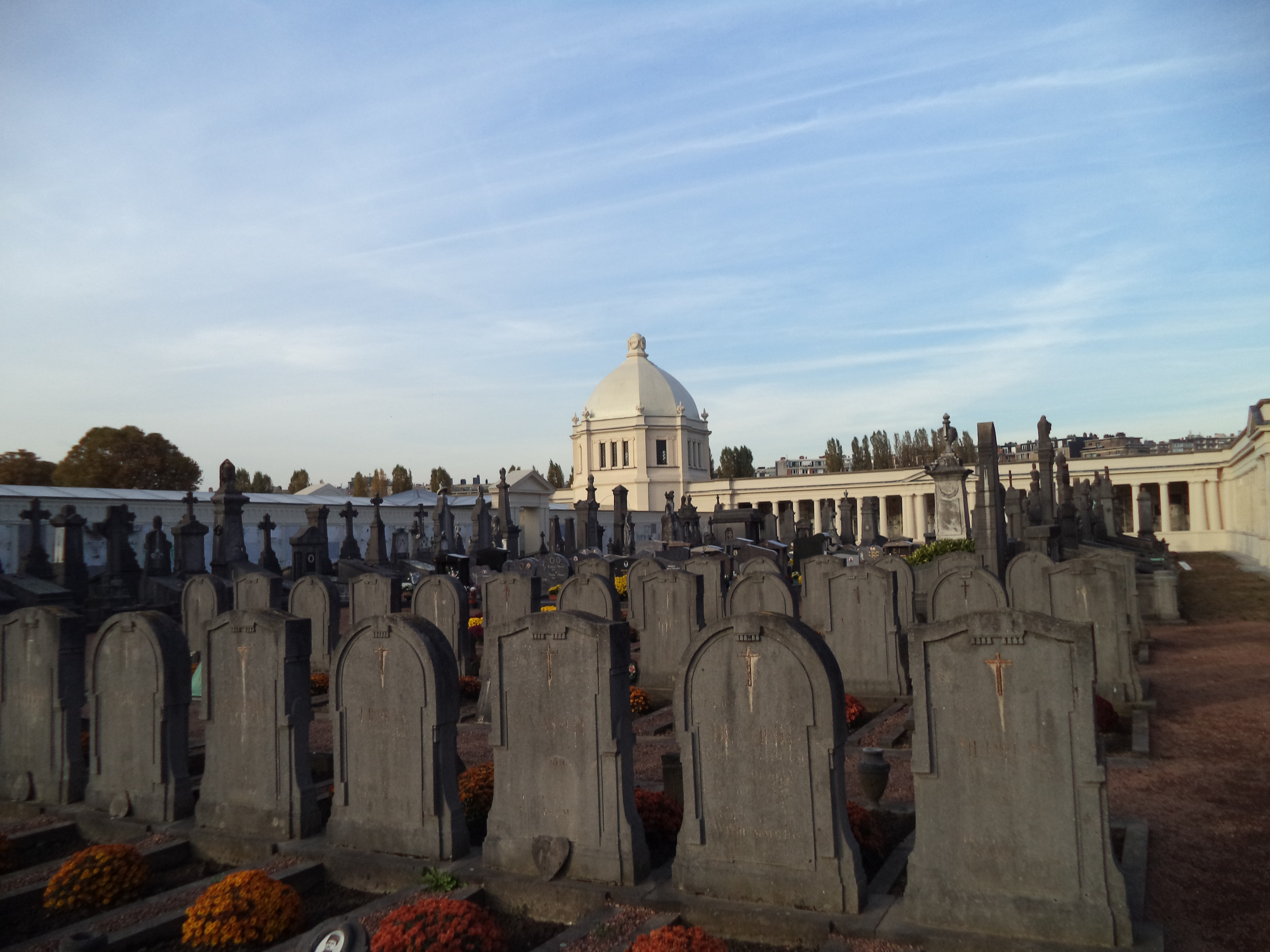
General view

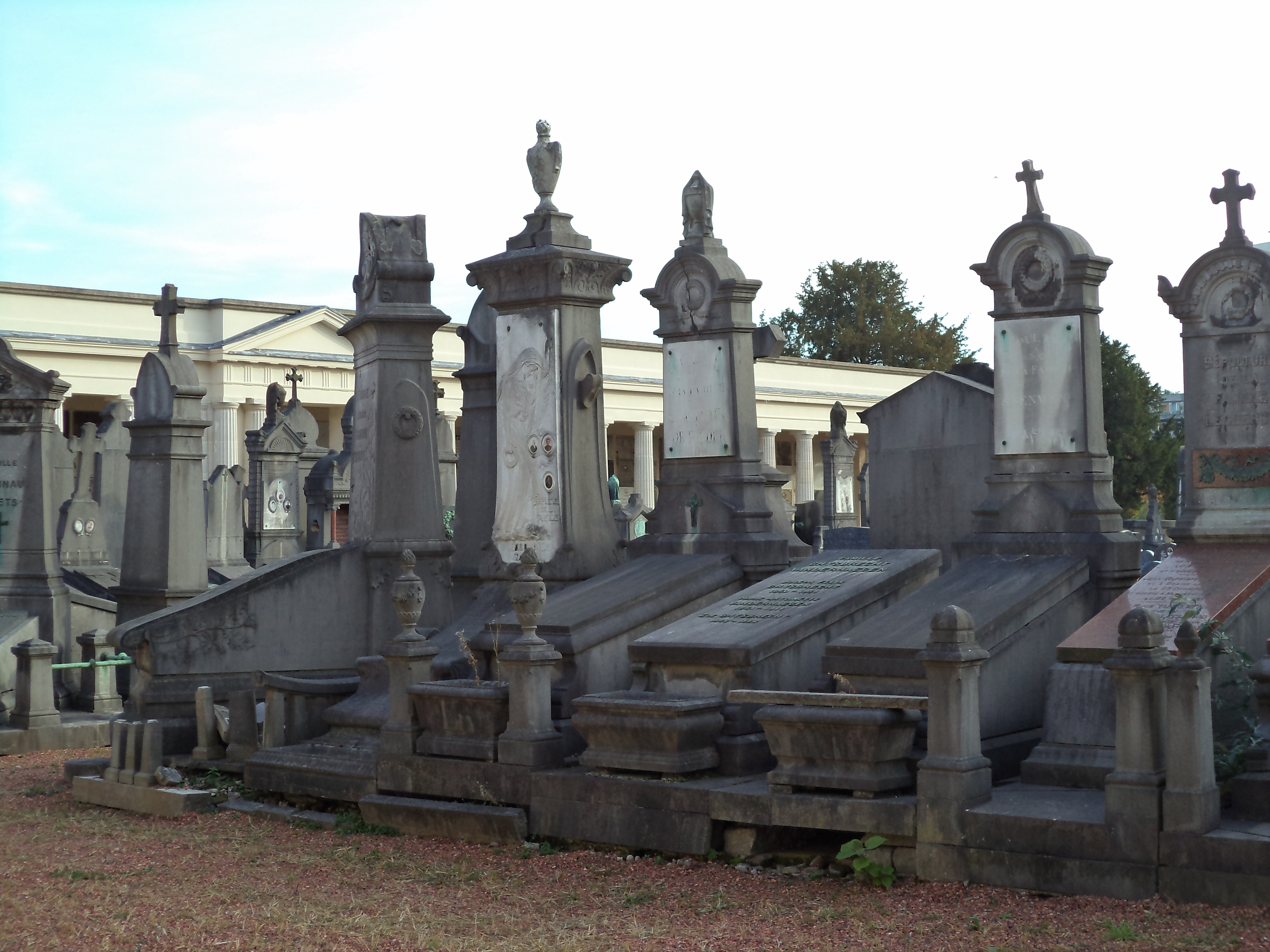
Gravestones

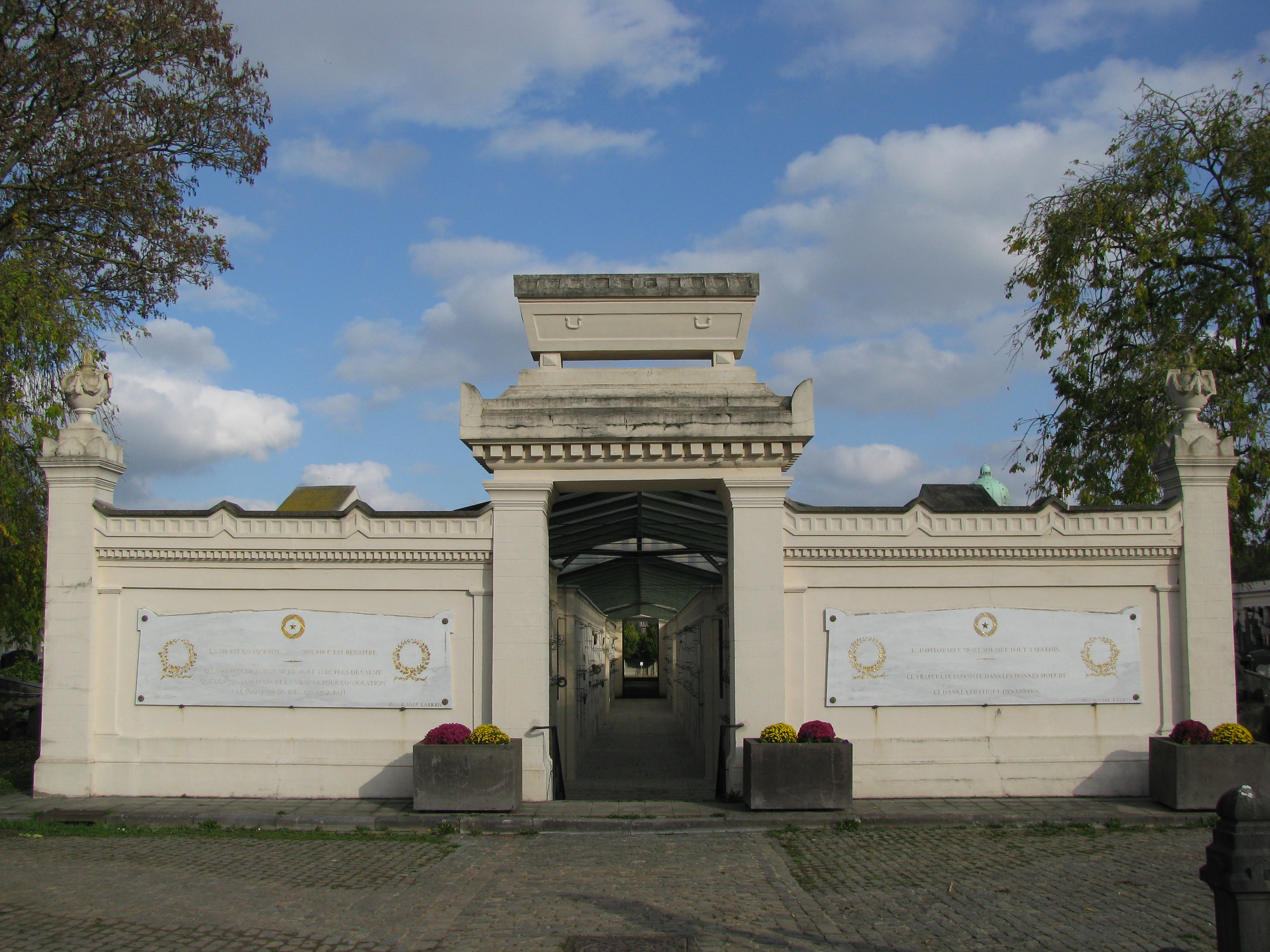
Entrance of the columbarium

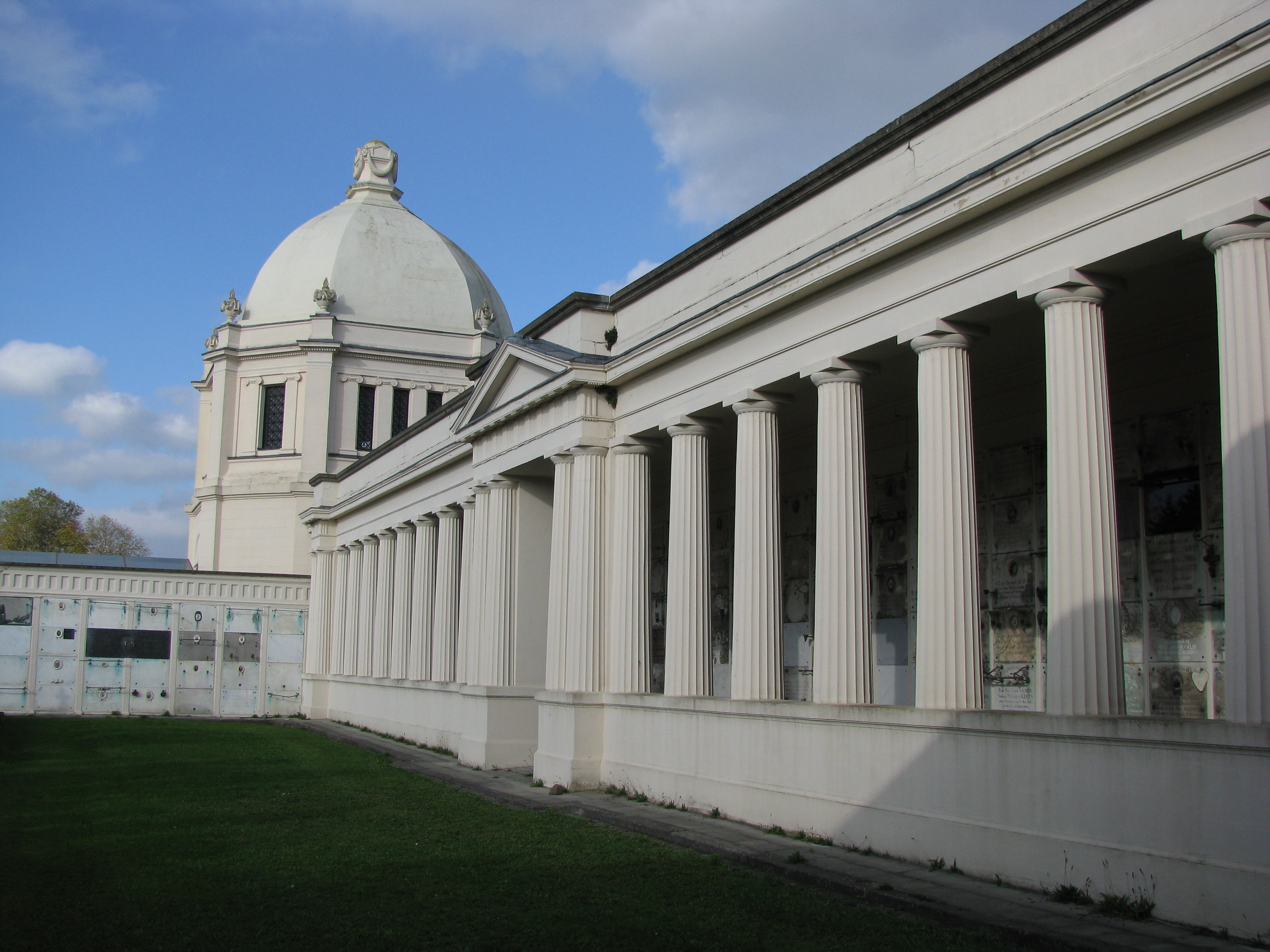
Columbarium

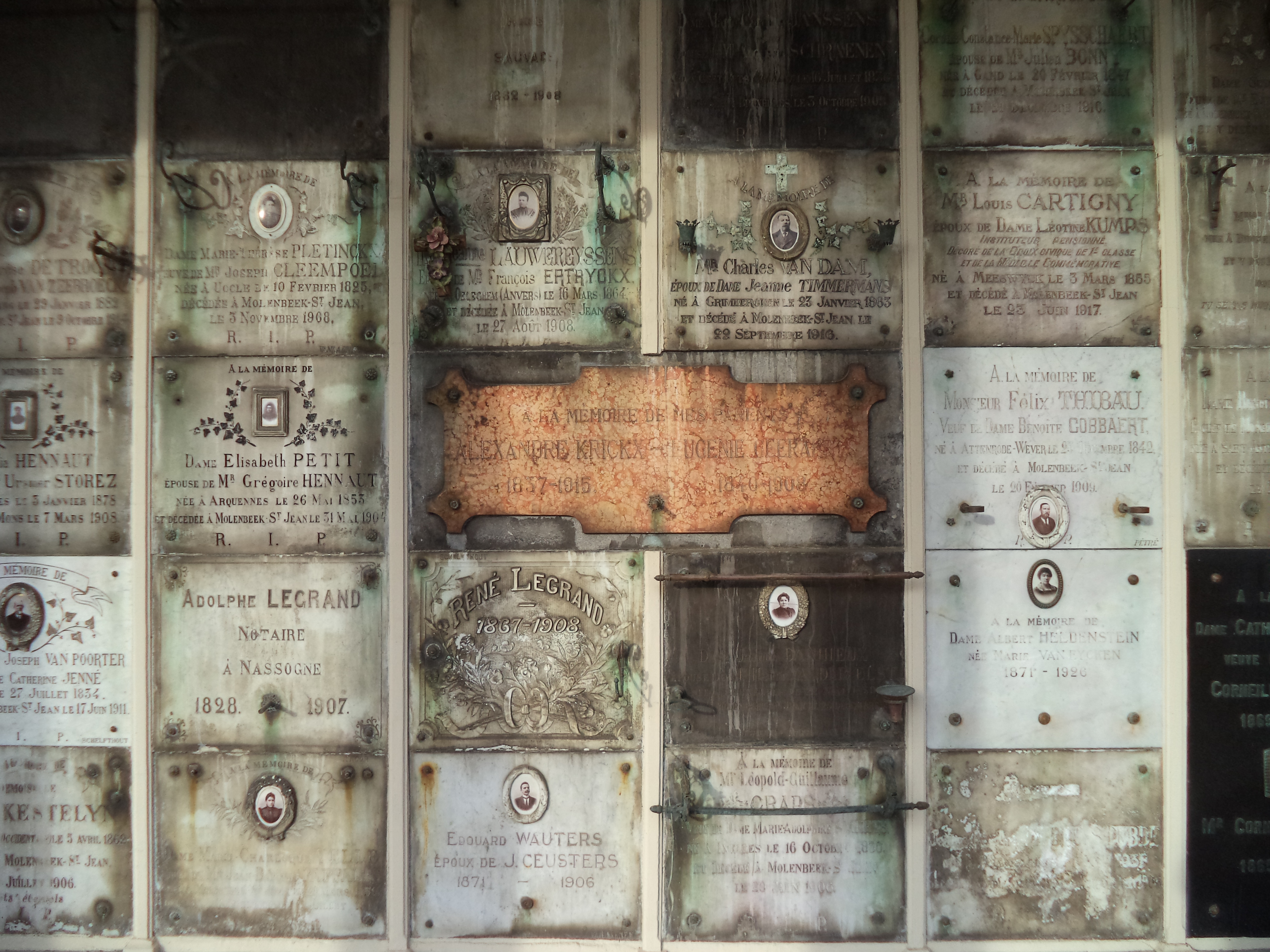
Detail of the columbarium

== Notable interments ==
Personalities buried there include:

- Jan Frantz De Mol, composer
- Julien Hanssens (1842–1914), mayor from 1912 to 1914
- Henri Hollevoet (1833–1911), mayor from 1879 to 1911
- Ernest Kindermans (1875–1932), founder of the Kaaitheater
- Eugène Laermans (1864–1940), painter and engraver
- Edmond Machtens (1902–1978), mayor from 1939 to 1978
- Louise Charlotte Massart (1880–1906), dramaturge
- Louis Mettewie (1855–1942), mayor from 1919 to 1938
- Henry Meuwis (1870–1935), painter
- Sander Pierron (1872–1945), writer and art critic
- Jean-Baptiste Piron (1896–1974), military officer, best known for his role in the Free Belgian forces during World War II
- Édouard Van Haelen (1895–1936), swimmer and 1920 Summer Olympics medalist

== See also ==
- List of cemeteries in Belgium
- Anderlecht Cemetery
- Brussels Cemetery
- Ixelles Cemetery
- Laeken Cemetery
- Saint-Josse-ten-Noode Cemetery
- Schaerbeek Cemetery
