= Schaerbeek Cemetery =

Cemetery in Evere, Belgium

- Cimetière de Schaerbeek (French); Begraafplaats van Schaarbeek (Dutch)
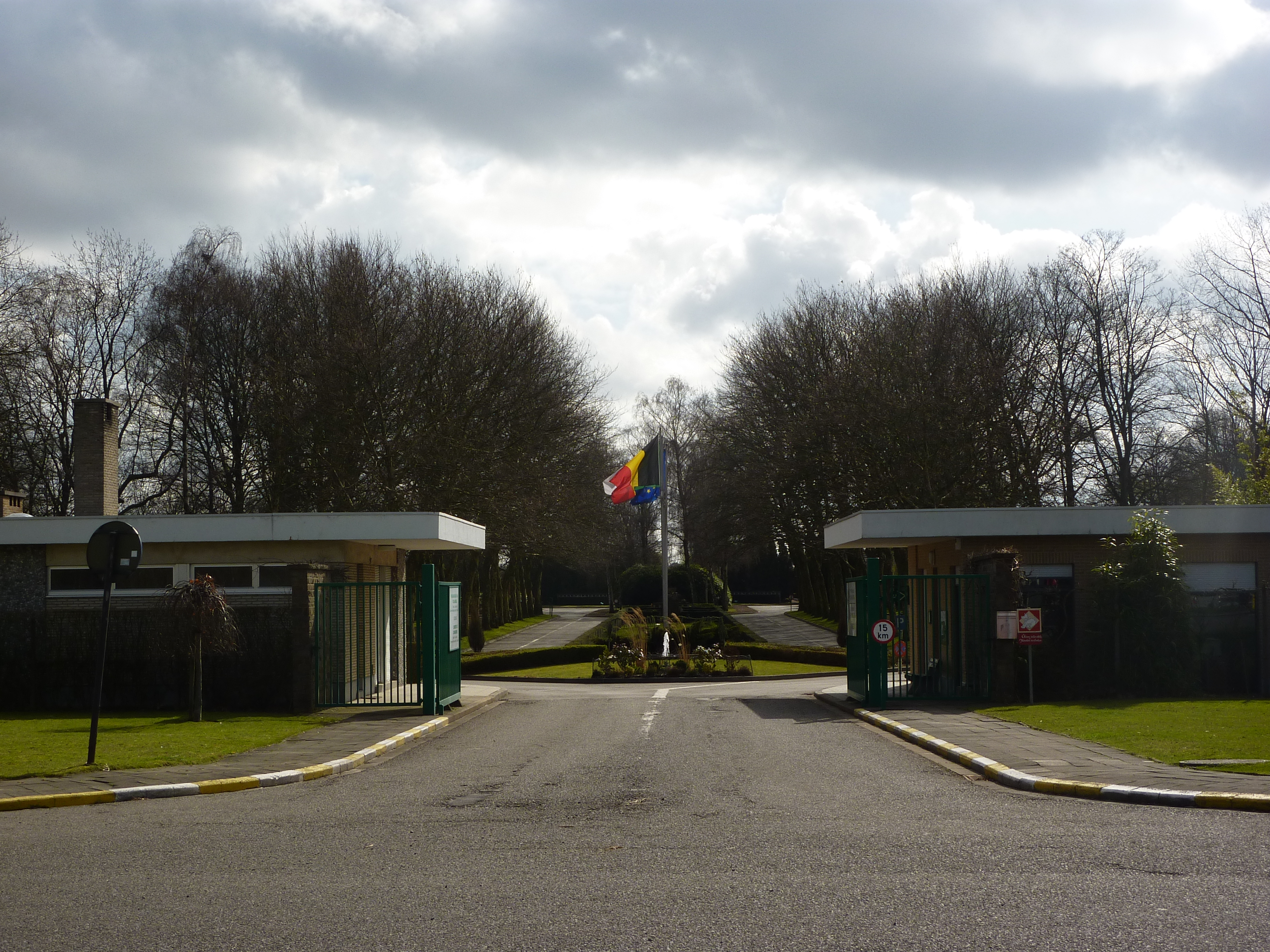
- Entrance of the cemetery
- Interactive map of Schaerbeek Cemetery

Details
- Location: Evere, Brussels-Capital Region
- Country: Belgium
- Coordinates: 50°52′15″N 4°25′12″E
- Type: Public, non-denominational

Schaerbeek Cemetery (French: Cimetière de Schaerbeek; Dutch: Begraafplaats van Schaarbeek), officially Schaerbeek New Cemetery (French: Nouveau Cimetière de Schaerbeek, Dutch: Nieuwe Begraafplaats van Schaarbeek), is a cemetery belonging to Schaerbeek in Brussels, Belgium, where the municipality's inhabitants have the right to be buried. It is not located in Schaerbeek itself; rather it is partially in the neighbouring municipality of Evere, and partially in the village of Sint-Stevens-Woluwe in Zaventem, Flemish Brabant. The cemetery is adjacent to Brussels Cemetery and Evere Cemetery, but should not be confused with either.

== Location and accessibility ==
Schaerbeek Cemetery is surrounded by the Avenue Jules Bordet/Jules Bordetlaan, the Rue d'Evere/Eversestraat and the Kleine Eversweg. The entry is in Evere on the Avenue Jules Bordet.

Immediately to the west of Schaerbeek Cemetery, and separated from it by a walkway, is Evere Cemetery.

== Notable interments ==
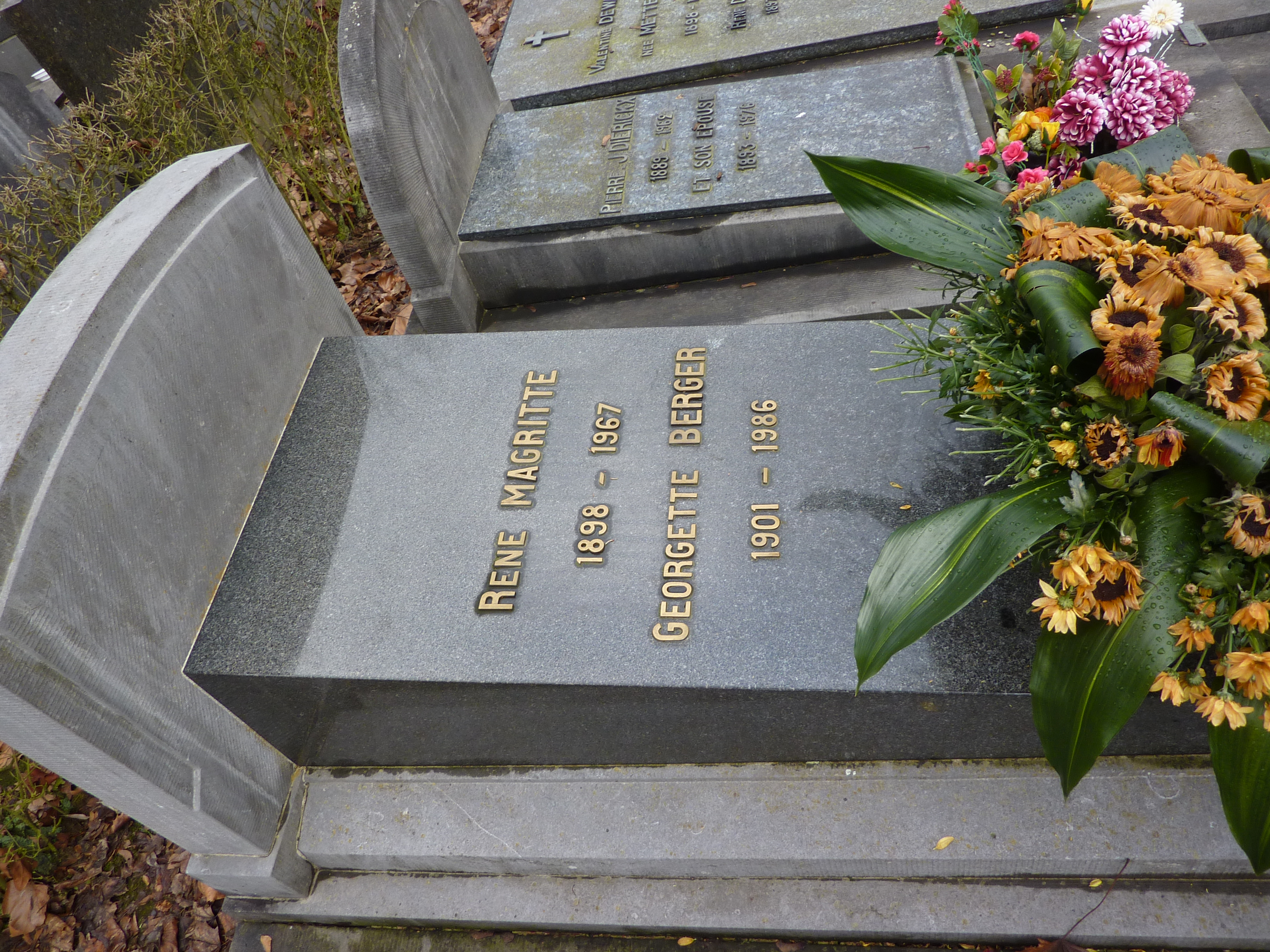
Tomb of René Magritte and his wife

Personalities buried there include:

- Henri Jaspar (1870–1939), lawyer and politician
- Andrée de Jongh (1916–2007), member of the Resistance during World War II, leader of the Comet Line
- René Magritte (1898–1967), surrealist artist, and his wife Georgette (Note: The grave of René Magritte and Georgette Berger is noted as being located at plot 16, row 2, 26th tombstone, concession 3047.)
- Marcel Mariën (1920–1993), surrealist artist
- Gabrielle Petit (1893–1916), World War I spy for the Allies

== See also ==
- List of cemeteries in Belgium
- Anderlecht Cemetery
- Ixelles Cemetery
- Laeken Cemetery
- Molenbeek-Saint-Jean Cemetery
- Saint-Josse-ten-Noode Cemetery
