= George Thompson (VC) =

Recipient of the Victoria Cross

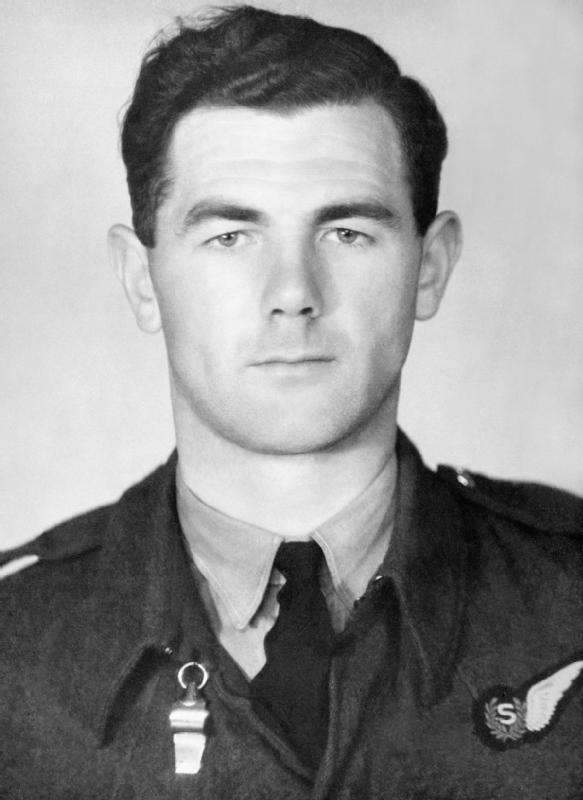
- Born: 23 October 1920; Trinity Gask, Perthshire, United Kingdom
- Died: 23 January 1945 (aged 24); Eindhoven, Netherlands
- Burial place: Brussels Cemetery, Belgium
- Military career
- Allegiance: United Kingdom
- Branch: Royal Air Force
- Service years: 1941-1945
- Rank: Flight Sergeant
- Units: No. 9 Squadron RAF
- Conflicts: World War II: European air campaign (DOW)
- Awards: Victoria Cross

George Thompson VC (23 October 1920 – 23 January 1945) was a Scottish recipient of the Victoria Cross, the highest and most prestigious award for gallantry in the face of the enemy that can be awarded to British and Commonwealth forces.

== Biography ==
Thompson was born in Trinity Gask, Perthshire and educated at Portmoak Primary School and Kinross High School. After being apprenticed to a grocer in Kinross he joined the Local Defence Volunteers when the Second World War began. In January 1941 he joined the Royal Air Force Volunteer Reserve, training as a ground crew wireless operator and serving in Iraq. He then volunteered for aircrew and was posted to RAF Bomber Command.

== Details of deed ==
He was 24 years old and a Flight Sergeant in No. 9 Squadron when the deed took place for which he was awarded the VC. On 1 January 1945 in an attack on the Dortmund-Ems Canal, Germany, Lancaster bomber serial PD377, after releasing its bombs, was hit by two shells and a raging fire broke out. Flight Sergeant Thompson, who was the wireless operator, seeing that the mid-upper gun turret was ablaze, went at once through the smoke filled fuselage into the fire and exploding ammunition in the turret to help the gunner to a place of relative safety. He extinguished his burning clothing with his bare hands and in doing so sustained serious burns to his legs, hands and face.

He then went to the rear turret which was also ablaze and again used his already burnt bare hands to beat out flames on the gunner's clothing. Then, despite his shocking state of burns and charred clothing, he returned through the burning fuselage to report to the pilot. The crippled aircraft finally crash-landed; the rear gunner survived and made a full recovery but the mid-upper gunner died. Flight Sergeant Thompson began to recover from his injuries in hospital but died of pneumonia three weeks later.

== Legacy ==
Thompson's Victoria Cross is displayed at the National War Museum of Scotland, Edinburgh Castle, Edinburgh, Scotland. George Thompson is commemorated on The Portmoak Parish War Memorial, which is located within the grounds of The Bishopshire Golf Club at Portmoak in the county of Perth & Kinross, Scotland and on the Wall of Names at the international Bomber Command Centre, Lincoln
