= Laeken Cemetery =

Cemetery in Laeken, Belgium

- Cimetière de Laeken (French); Begraafplaats van Laken (Dutch)
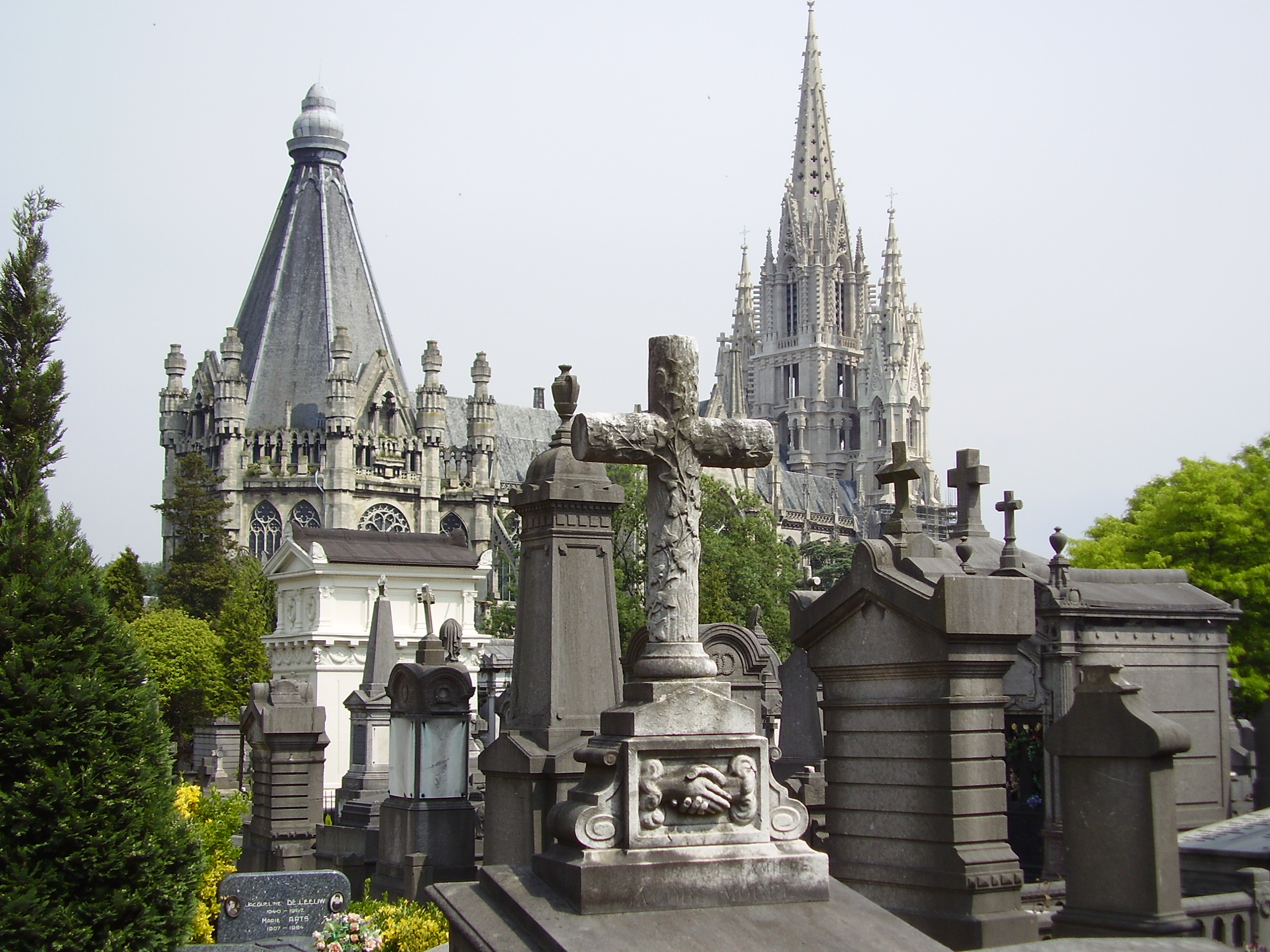
- View of the Church of Our Lady of Laeken
- Interactive map of Laeken Cemetery

Details
- Established: 1275
- Location: Laeken, City of Brussels, Brussels-Capital Region
- Country: Belgium
- Coordinates: 50°52′46″N 4°21′11″E
- Type: Public, non-denominational
- Size: 6.3 hectares (16 acres)

Laeken Cemetery (French: Cimetière de Laeken; Dutch: Begraafplaats van Laken) in Brussels, Belgium, is the city's oldest cemetery still in function and the resting place of the Belgian royal family. It is known as the Belgian Père Lachaise, after Paris' famous cemetery, because it is the burial place of the rich and the famous and for the abundance of its funerary heritage.

== History ==
The oldest part of the cemetery is situated around the choir of the old Church of Our Lady of Laeken. During the 19th and 20th centuries, the cemetery was expanded several times to the south and east. A first expansion took place in 1832, when the area was doubled to over 1 hectare (2.5 acres). In 1850, the death of Queen Louise-Marie, wife of King Leopold I, and her wish to be buried in Laeken, further increased the site's appeal. Additional expansions brought the cemetery's size to 2.46 hectares (6.1 acres) in 1855 and 4.3 hectares (11 acres) in 1886.

== Description ==
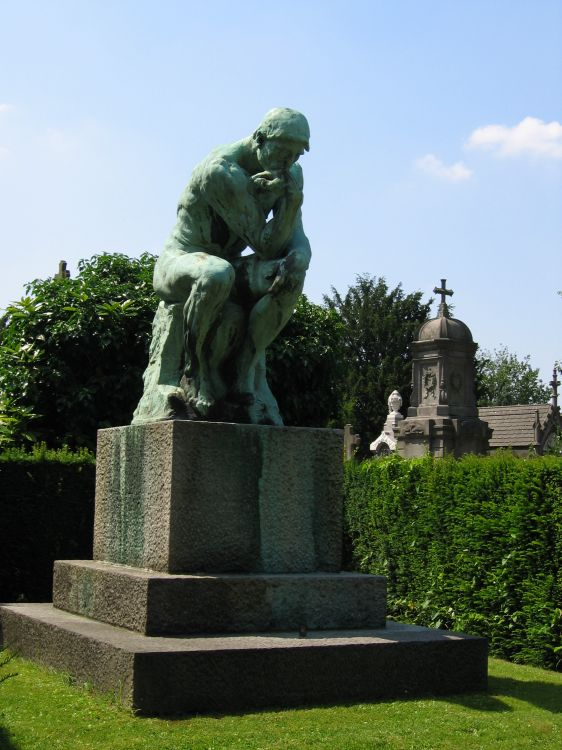
The Thinker by Auguste Rodin, original bronze

The cemetery contains fine examples of 19th-century funerary art and also features an original bronze cast of Auguste Rodin's The Thinker, purchased in 1927 by the antiquarian and art collector Josef Dillen to use as his own memorial. Next to the entrance, there is a small museum dedicated to the sculptor Ernest Salu and his successors.

The adjacent Church of Our Lady of Laeken is the site of the Royal Crypt, the resting place of the Belgian royal family, consecrated in 1872.

== Notable interments ==
Personalities buried there include:

- Alphonse Balat (1818–1895), architect
- Charles Auguste de Bériot (1802–1870), violinist and composer
- Jacques Coghen (1791–1858), Finance Minister and ancestor of King Philippe
- Michel de Ghelderode (1898–1962), writer
- Camille Jenatzy (1868–1913), race-car driver
- Fernand Khnopff (1858–1921), painter
- Maria Malibran (1808–1836), opera singer, with a work by sculptor Guillaume Geefs
- Joseph Poelaert (1817–1879), architect
- Louis-Joseph Seutin (1793–1862), surgeon
- Léon Suys (1823–1887), architect
- Augustus Van Dievoet (1803–1865), jurisconsult
- Parthon de Von family

== Graves ==
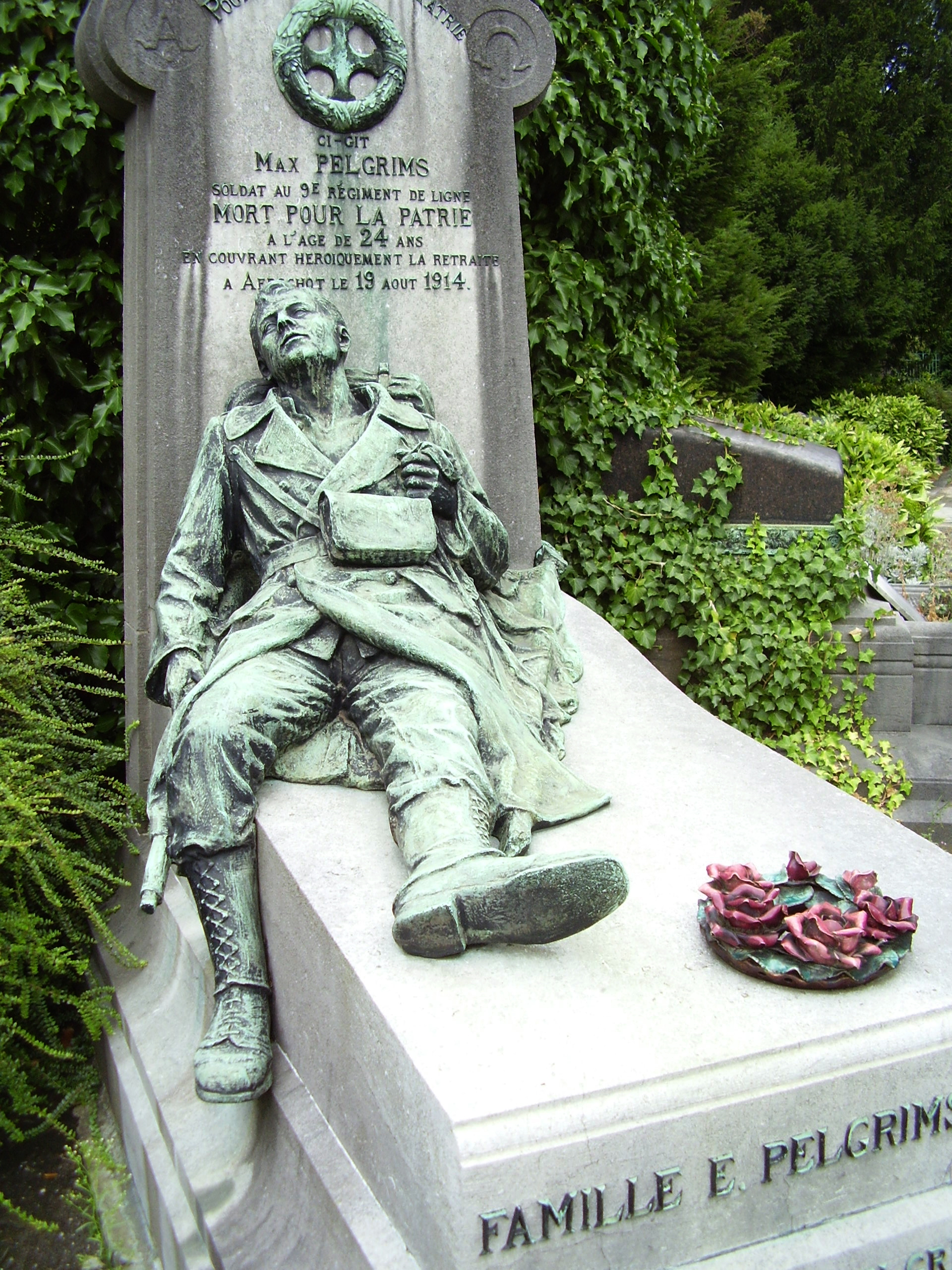

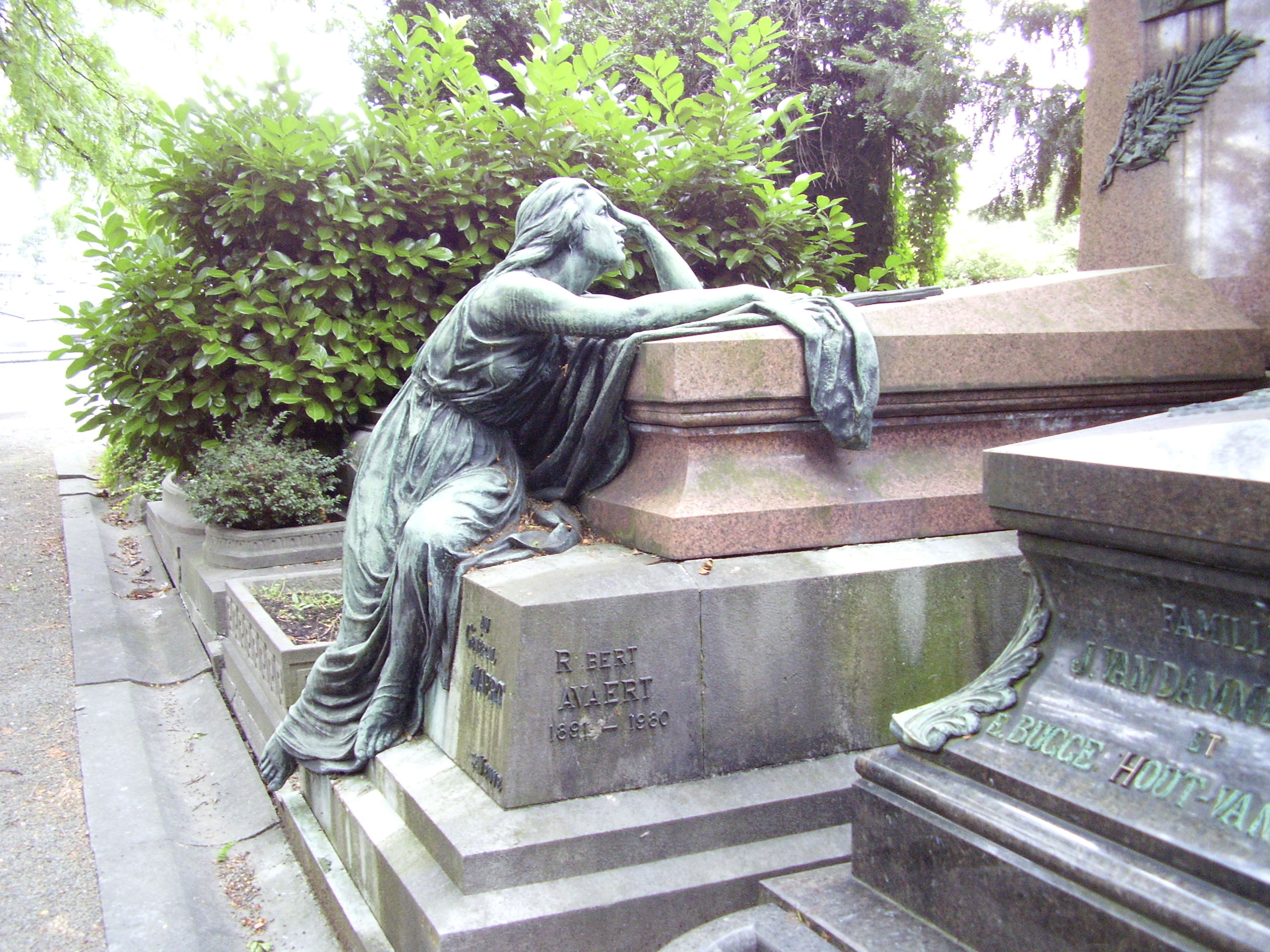

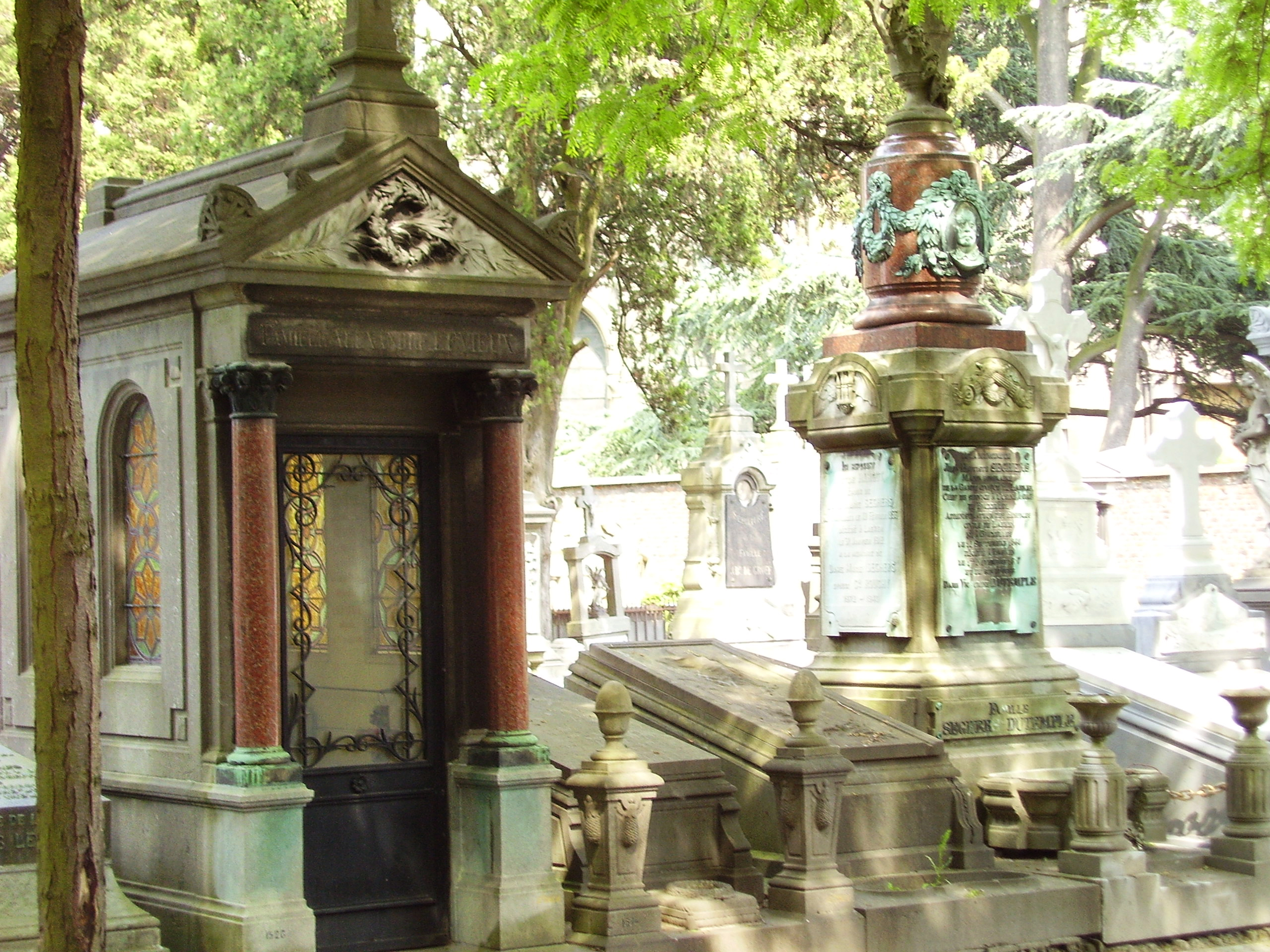

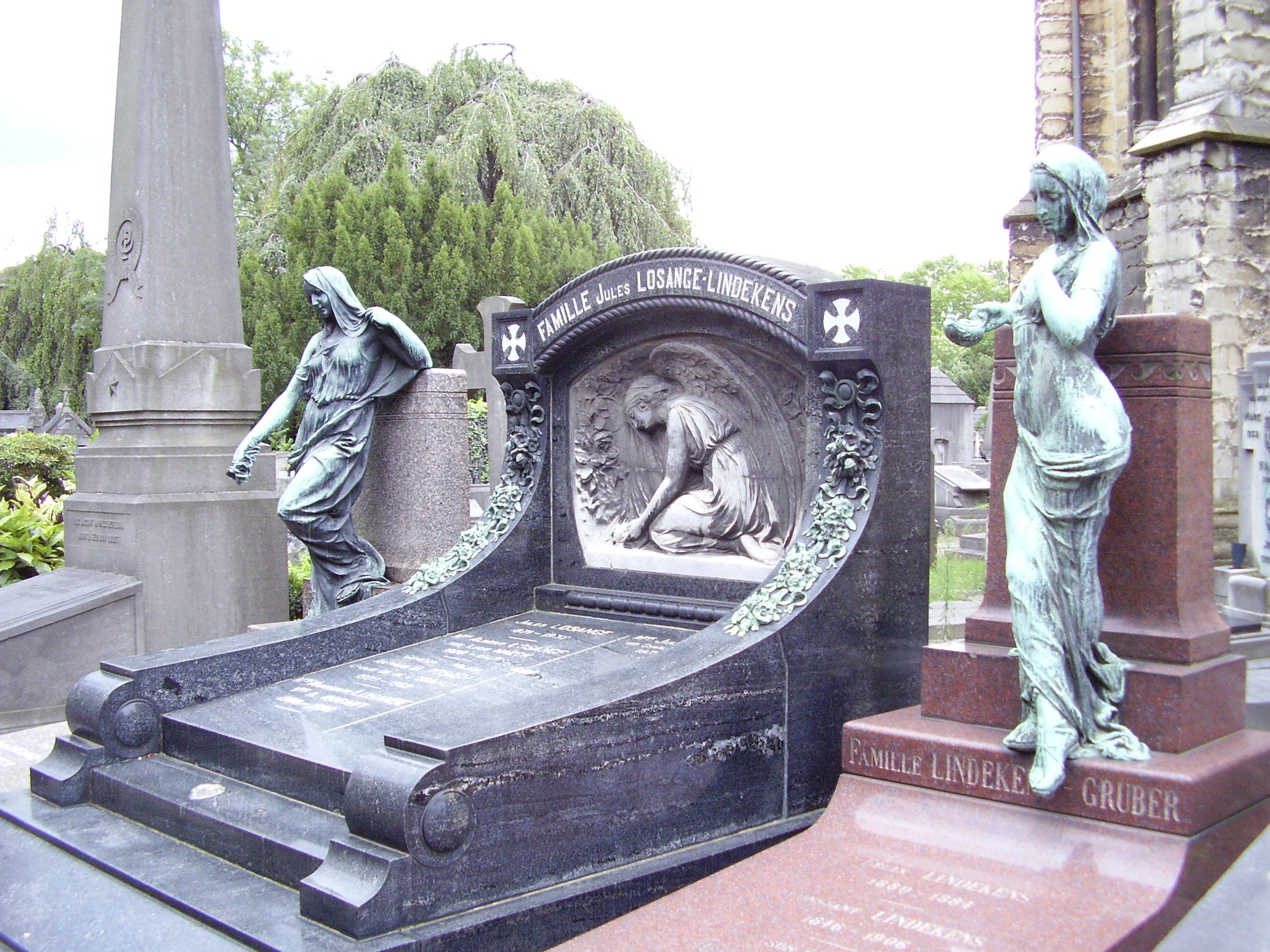

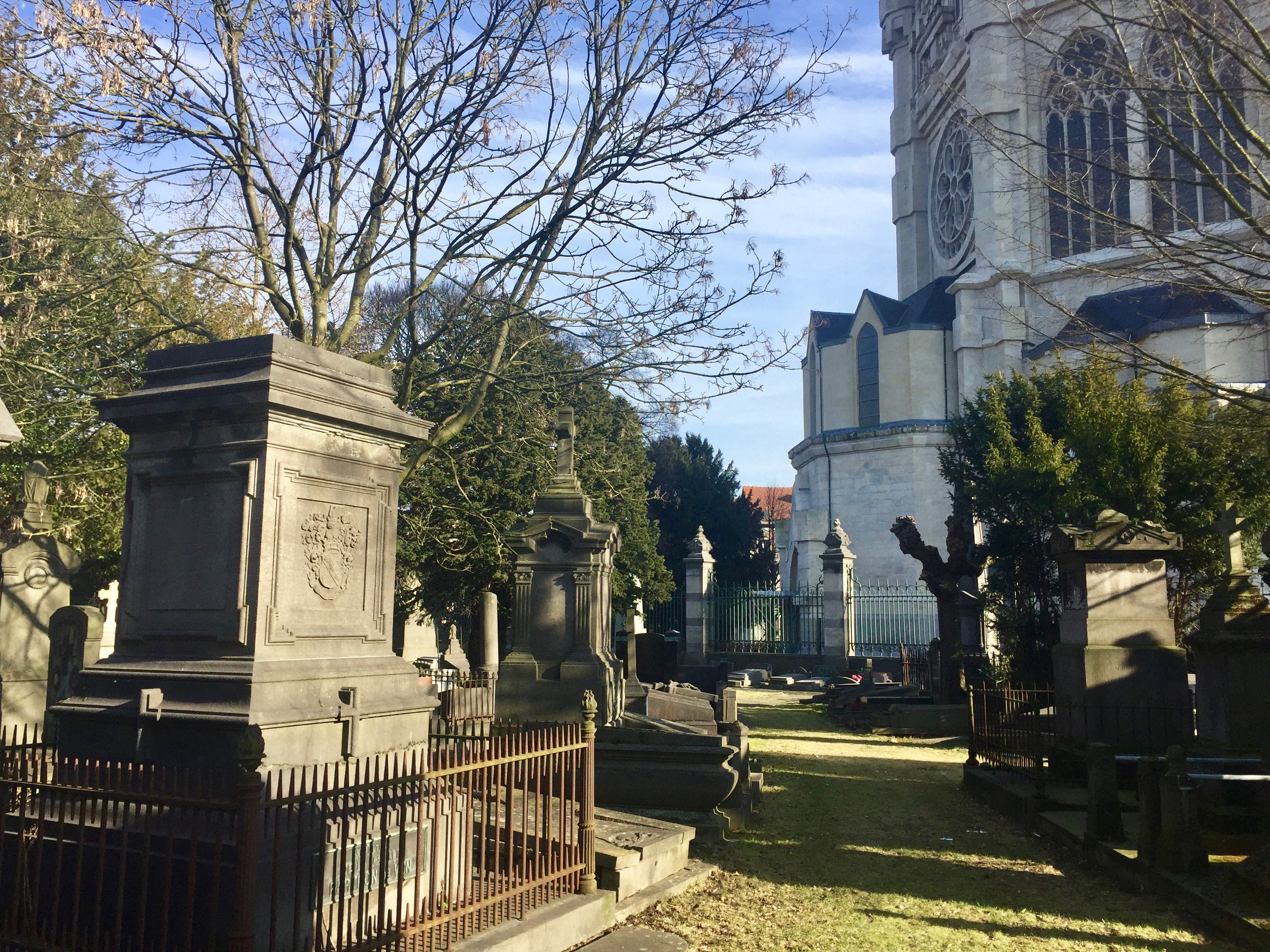

== See also ==
- List of cemeteries in Belgium
- Anderlecht Cemetery
- Brussels Cemetery
- Ixelles Cemetery
- Molenbeek-Saint-Jean Cemetery
- Saint-Josse-ten-Noode Cemetery
- Schaerbeek Cemetery
