= Saint-Josse-ten-Noode Cemetery =

Cemetery in Schaerbeek, Belgium

- Cimetière de Saint-Josse-ten-Noode (French); Begraafplaats van Sint-Joost-ten-Node (Dutch)
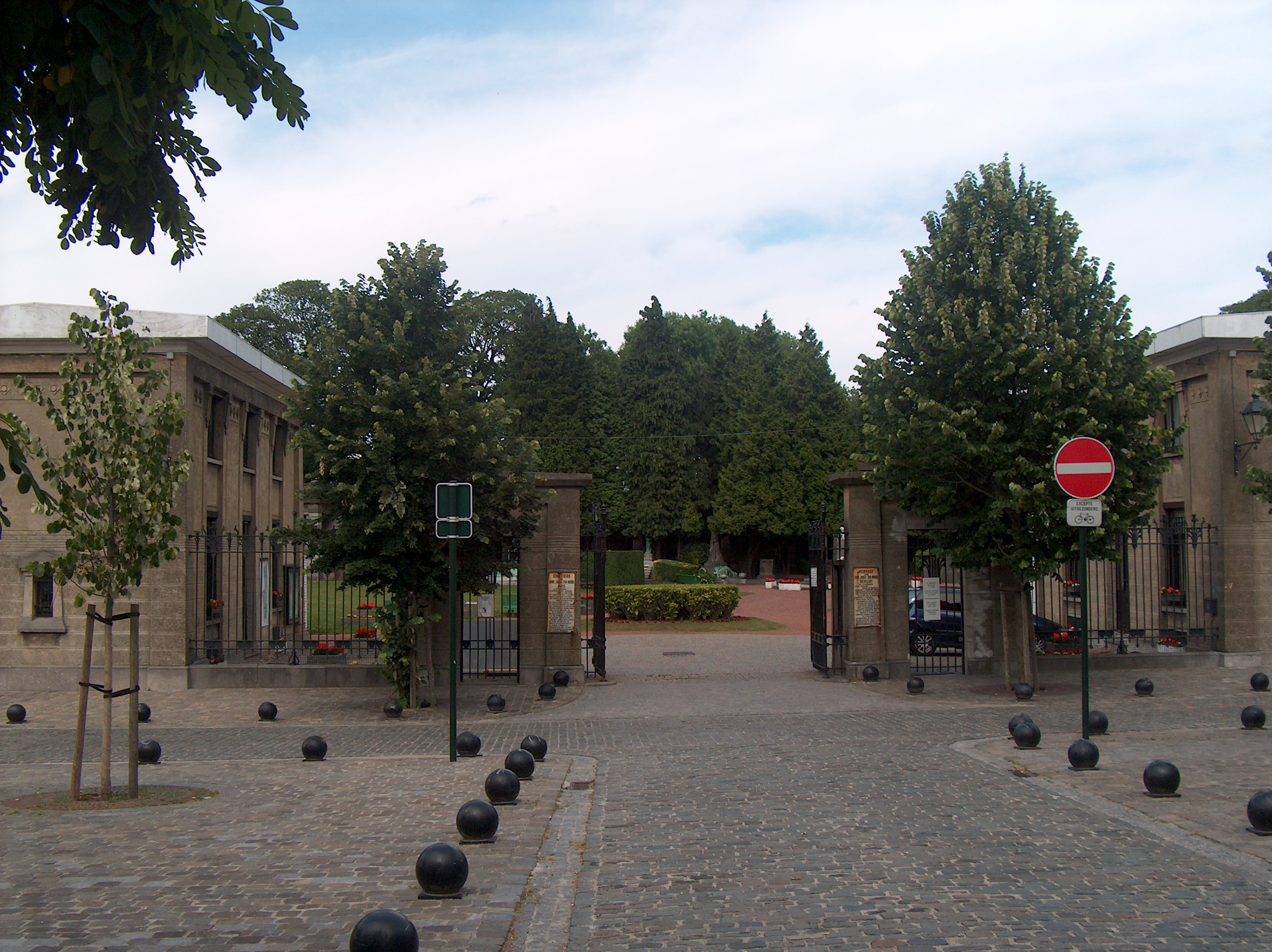
- Entrance of the cemetery
- Interactive map of Saint-Josse-ten-Noode Cemetery

Details
- Location: Schaerbeek, Brussels-Capital Region
- Country: Belgium
- Coordinates: 50°51′25″N 4°24′8″E
- Type: Public, non-denominational

Saint-Josse-ten-Noode Cemetery (French: Cimetière de Saint-Josse-ten-Noode; Dutch: Begraafplaats van Sint-Joost-ten-Node) is a cemetery belonging to Saint-Josse-ten-Noode in Brussels, Belgium, where the municipality's inhabitants have the right to be buried. It is not located in Saint-Josse itself, but in the neighbouring municipality of Schaerbeek.

== Notable interments ==
Personalities buried there include:

- Edouard Agneessens (1842–1885), painter
- Guy Cudell (1917–1999), mayor from 1953 to 1999
- Jean-Baptiste Madou (1796–1877), painter and lithographer
- Charles Rogier (1800–1885), statesman
- Eugène Van Bemmel (1824–1880), author and educator
- André Van Hasselt (1806–1874), writer and poet

== Gallery ==
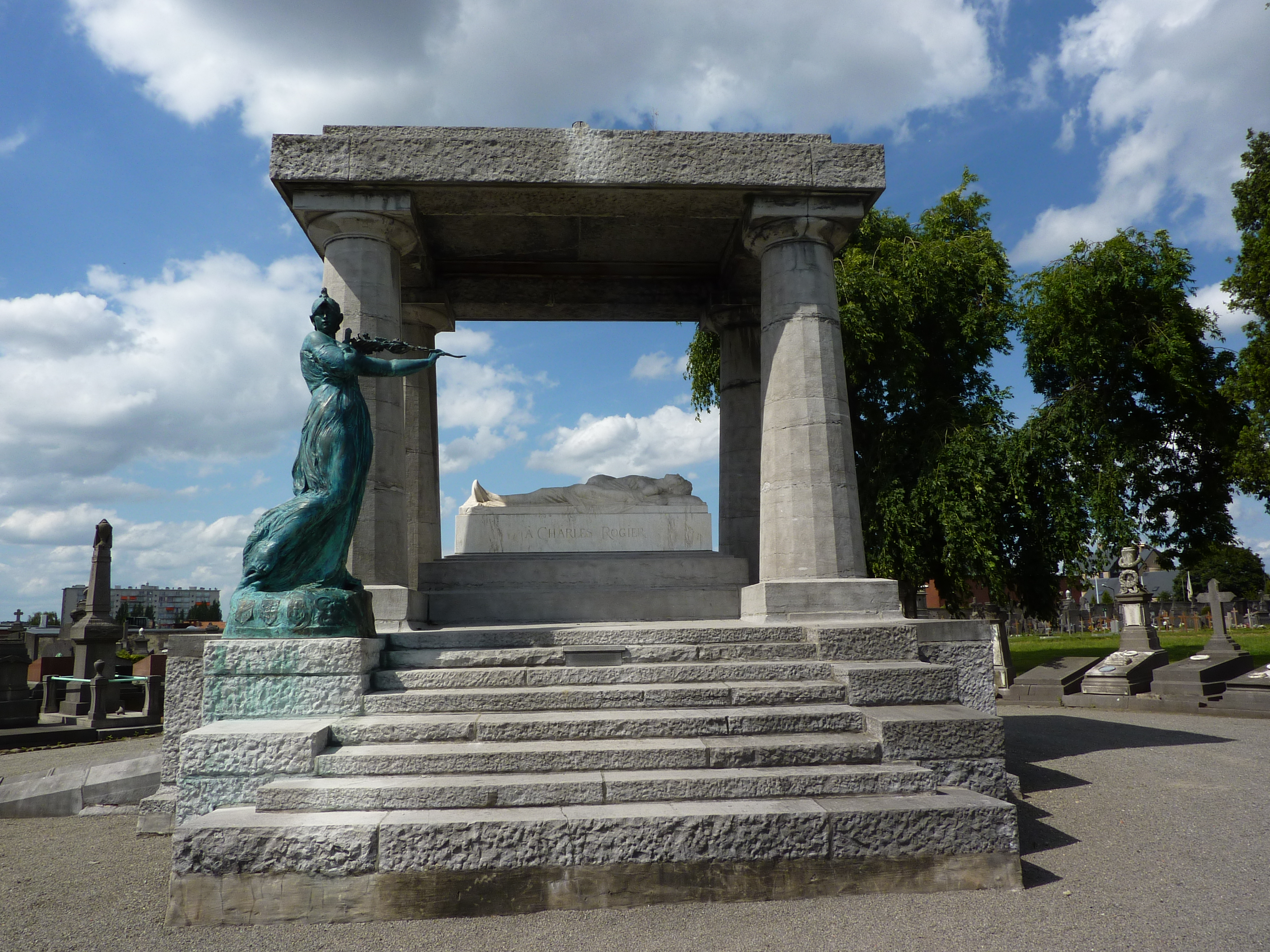
Mausoleum of Charles Rogier

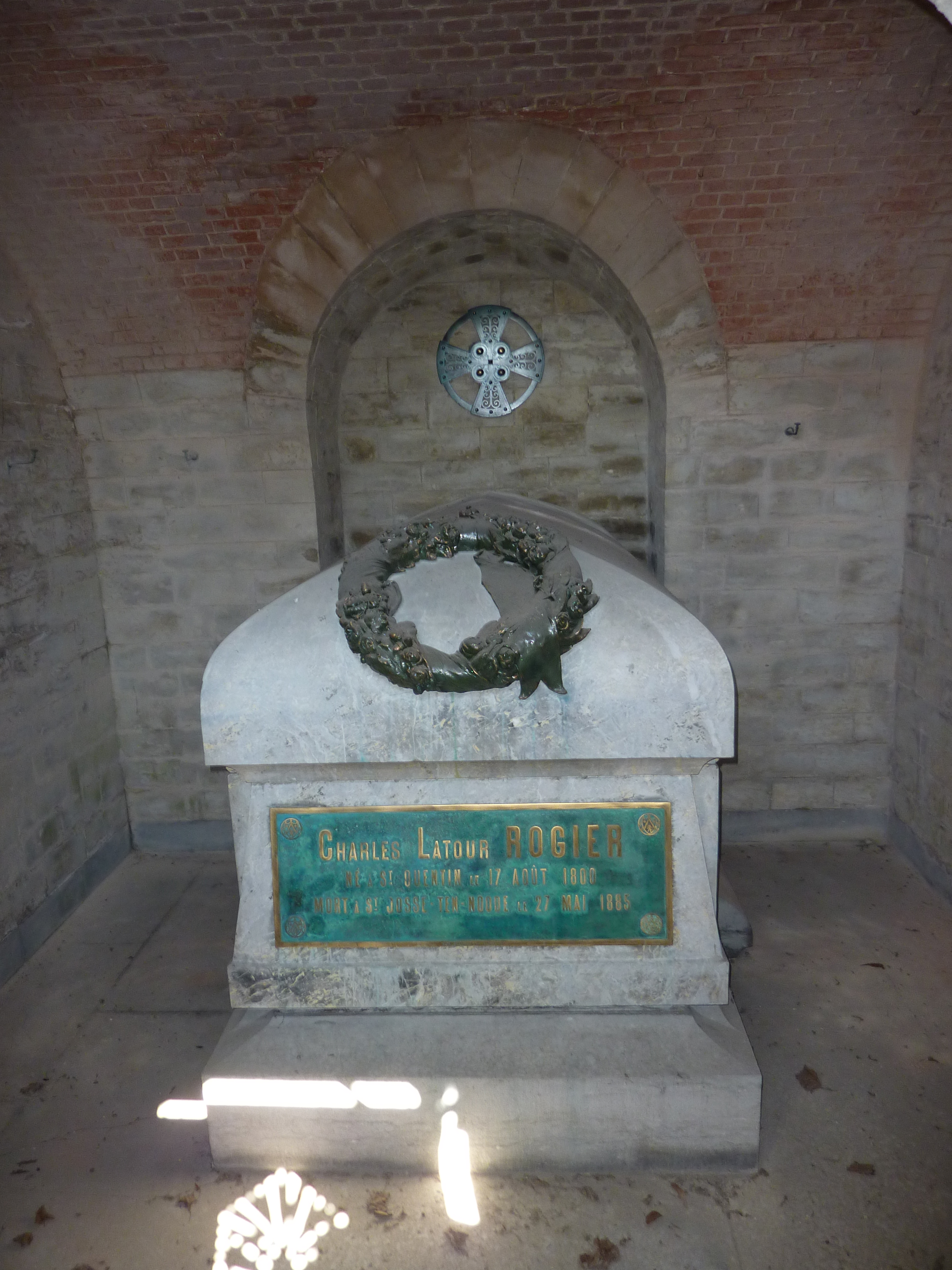
Crypt and grave of Charles Rogier

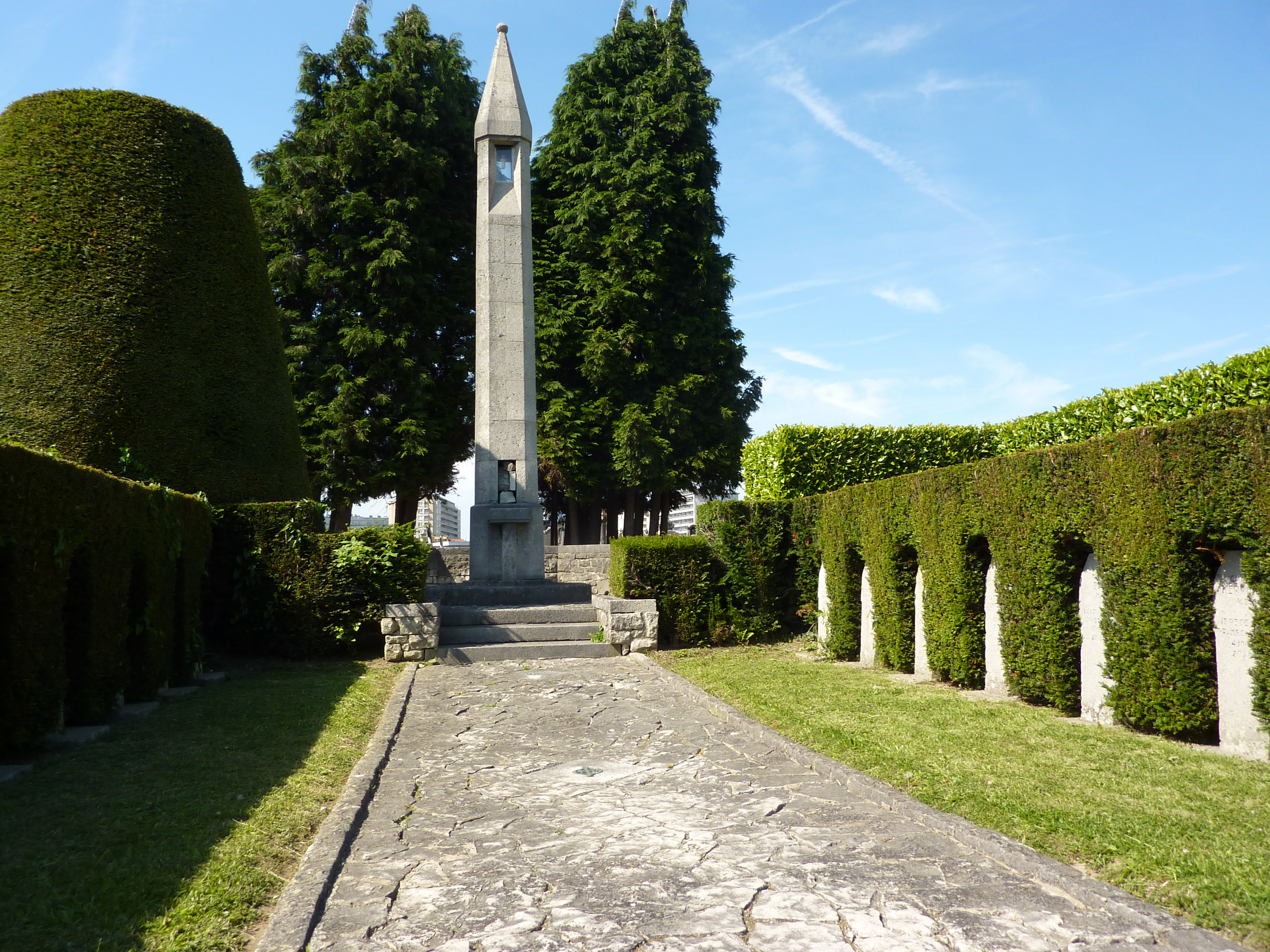
World War I memorial

== See also ==
- List of cemeteries in Belgium
- Anderlecht Cemetery
- Brussels Cemetery
- Ixelles Cemetery
- Laeken Cemetery
- Molenbeek-Saint-Jean Cemetery
- Schaerbeek Cemetery
