= Ixelles Cemetery =

Cemetery in Ixelles, Belgium

- Cimetière d'Ixelles (French); Begraafplaats van Elsene (Dutch)
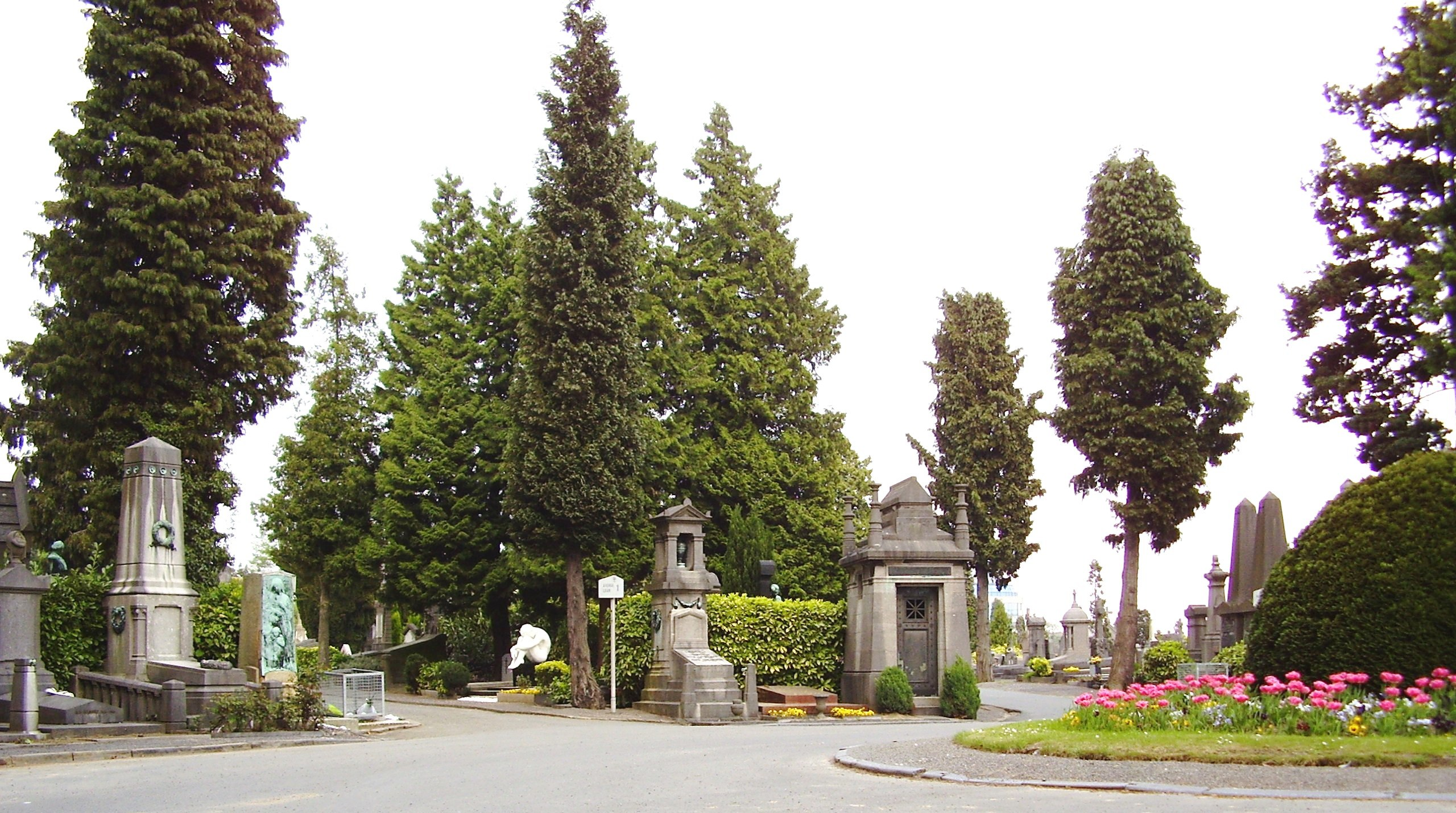
- View of the cemetery
- Interactive map of Ixelles Cemetery

Details
- Location: Ixelles, Brussels-Capital Region
- Country: Belgium
- Coordinates: 50°48′54″N 4°23′31″E
- Type: Public, non-denominational

Ixelles Cemetery (French: Cimetière d'Ixelles, pronounced [simtjɛʁ diksɛl]; Dutch: Begraafplaats van Elsene), located in Ixelles in the southern part of Brussels, is one of the major cemeteries in Belgium. Ixelles Cemetery also refers to a neighbourhood with a lot of bars and restaurants for students, north of the actual cemetery. It is in fact located between the two main campuses (Solbosch/Solbos and La Plaine/Het Plein) of the Université libre de Bruxelles (ULB) and the Vrije Universiteit Brussel (VUB).

== Notable interments ==
Personalities buried there include:

- Luigi Bigiarelli (1876–1908), athlete, founder of the S.S. Lazio
- Anna Boch (1848–1936), painter
- Jules Bordet (1870–1961), Nobel Prize in medicine
- Georges Boulanger (1837–1891), French Minister of War and exile in Belgium, who committed suicide there
- Victor Bourgeois (1897–1962), architect and urban planner
- Marcel Broodthaers (1924–1976), artist
- Fernand Brouez (1861–1900), editor of La Société Nouvelle
- Charles De Coster (1827–1879), novelist
- Neel Doff (1858–1942), artists' model and writer
- Jean Isaac Effront (1856–1931), inventor
- Antonio Oladeinde Fernandez (1936–2015), Nigerian diplomat and business tycoon
- Édouard Louis Geerts (1846–1889), sculptor, whose tomb was designed by the architect Victor Horta and the sculptor Charles van der Stappen
- Lucette Heuseux (1913–2010), painter
- Victor Horta (1861–1947), architect
- Louis Hymans (1829–1884), journalist and politician
- Paul Hymans (1865–1941), statesman
- Joseph Jacquet (1857–1917), army general during World War I
- Sylvain de Jong (1868–1928), maker of the luxury Minerva automobile
- Frédéric de La Hault (1860–1903), developed an 1885 motorised tricycle
- Camille Lemonnier (1844–1913), writer
- Constantin Meunier (1831–1905), painter and sculptor
- Jean-Baptiste Moëns (1833–1908), philatelist
- Frederic Neuhaus (1846–1912), pharmacist, inventor of chocolate pralines
- Paul Saintenoy (1862–1952), architect
- Jacques Saintenoy (1845–1947), architect
- Ernest Solvay (1838–1922), chemist and industrialist, tomb designed by Victor Horta
- Carl Sternheim (1878–1942), German writer
- Marc Van Bever (1974–2010), film producer
- Joseph Wieniawski (1837–1912), composer
- Antoine Wiertz (1806–1865), painter
- Eugène Ysaÿe (1858–1931), violinist

== War graves ==
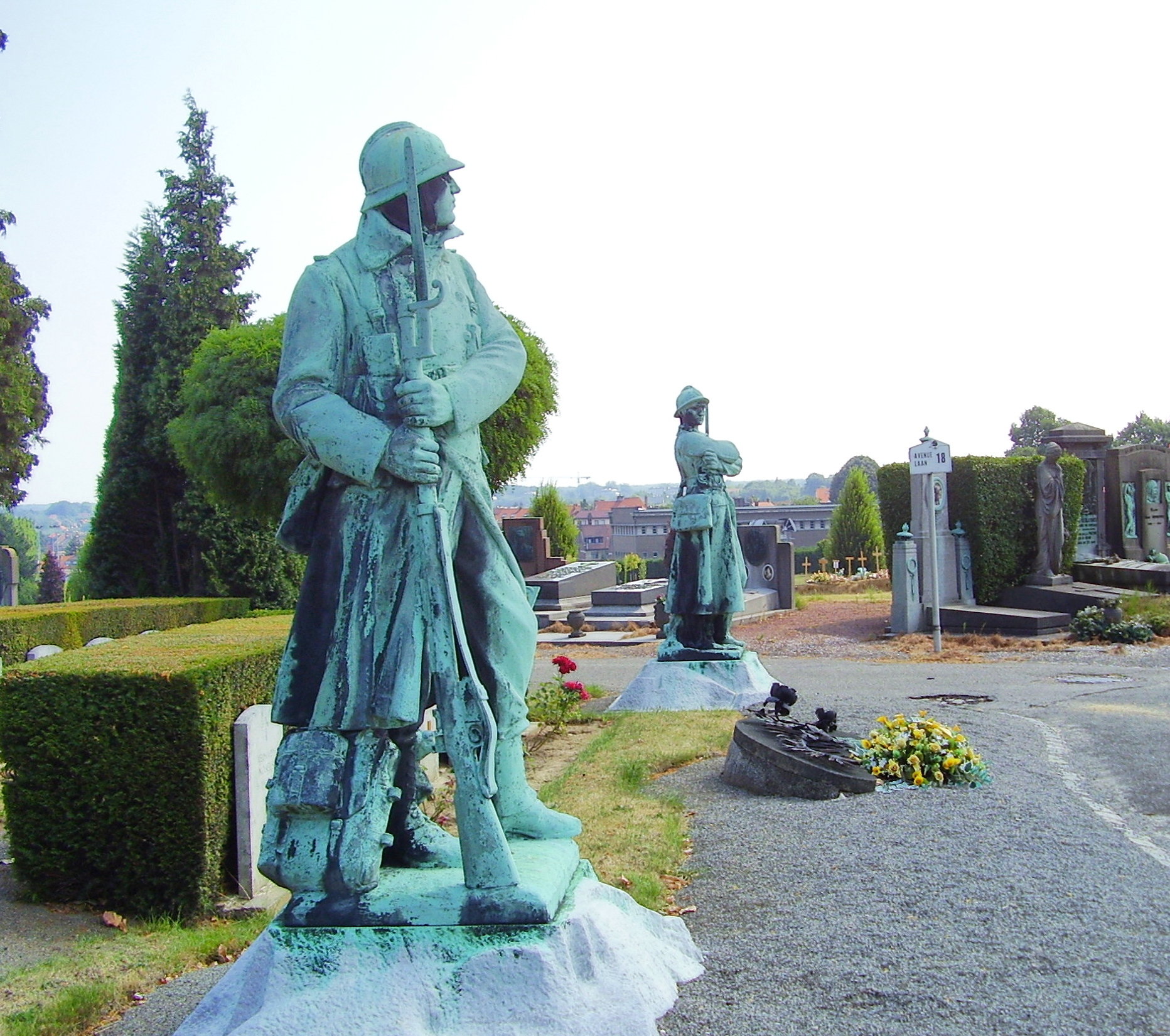
Military monument by Charles Samuel, in the Field of Honour

In the Field of Honour in Block A are buried First World War soldiers from Belgium, France, Italy, Russia and Great Britain (twelve identified soldiers), who died mainly as prisoners of war.

== See also ==
- List of cemeteries in Belgium
- Anderlecht Cemetery
- Brussels Cemetery
- Laeken Cemetery
- Molenbeek-Saint-Jean Cemetery
- Saint-Josse-ten-Noode Cemetery
- Schaerbeek Cemetery
