= Anderlecht Cemetery =

Cemetery in Anderlecht, Belgium

- Cimetière d'Anderlecht (French); Begraafplaats van Anderlecht (Dutch)
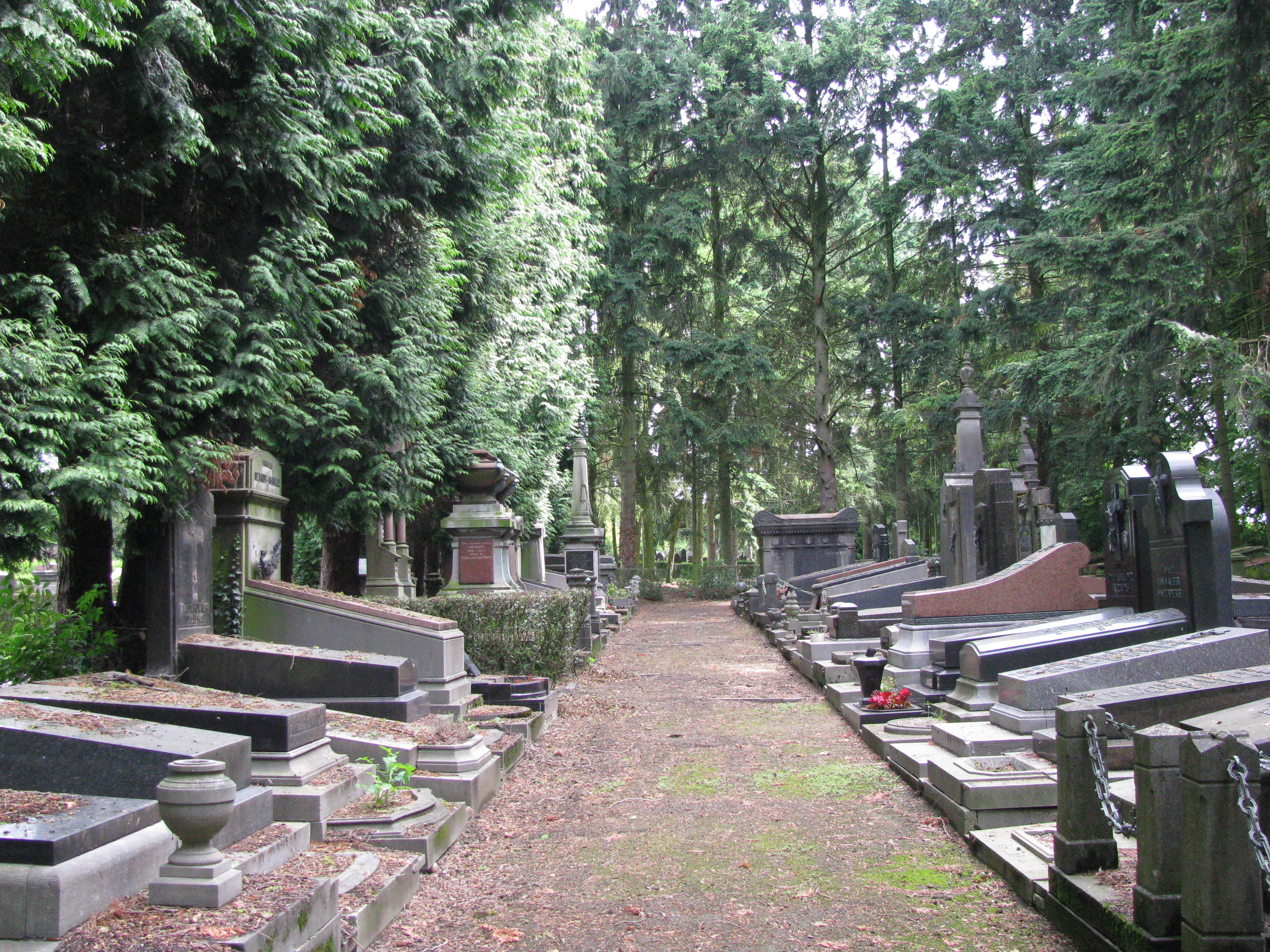
- View of the cemetery
- Interactive map of Anderlecht Cemetery

Details
- Established: 31 October 1954
- Location: Anderlecht, Brussels-Capital Region
- Country: Belgium
- Coordinates: 50°48′44″N 4°16′44″E
- Type: Public, non-denominational
- Size: 18.8 hectares (46 acres)

Anderlecht Cemetery (French: Cimetière d'Anderlecht; Dutch: Begraafplaats van Anderlecht), also known as Vogelenzang Cemetery (Note: French: Cimetière du Vogelenzang; Dutch: Begraafplaats Vogelenzang) or Vogelzang Cemetery, (Note: French: Cimetière du Vogelzang; Dutch: Begraafplaats Vogelzang) is a cemetery belonging to Anderlecht in Brussels, Belgium, where the municipality's inhabitants have the right to be buried. It is located at 1–3, avenue du Soldat Britannique/Britse-Soldaatlaan, in the south of the municipality.

This modern cemetery was inaugurated on 31 October 1954, reflecting a shift in cemetery architecture towards more orderly, egalitarian design. The area is about 18 hectares (44 acres) in total. When it opened, families were given the option to transfer existing graves from the old municipal cemetery at the Place du Repos/Rustplein, and around 1,250 funerary monuments were thus moved to the new site.

== Notable interments ==
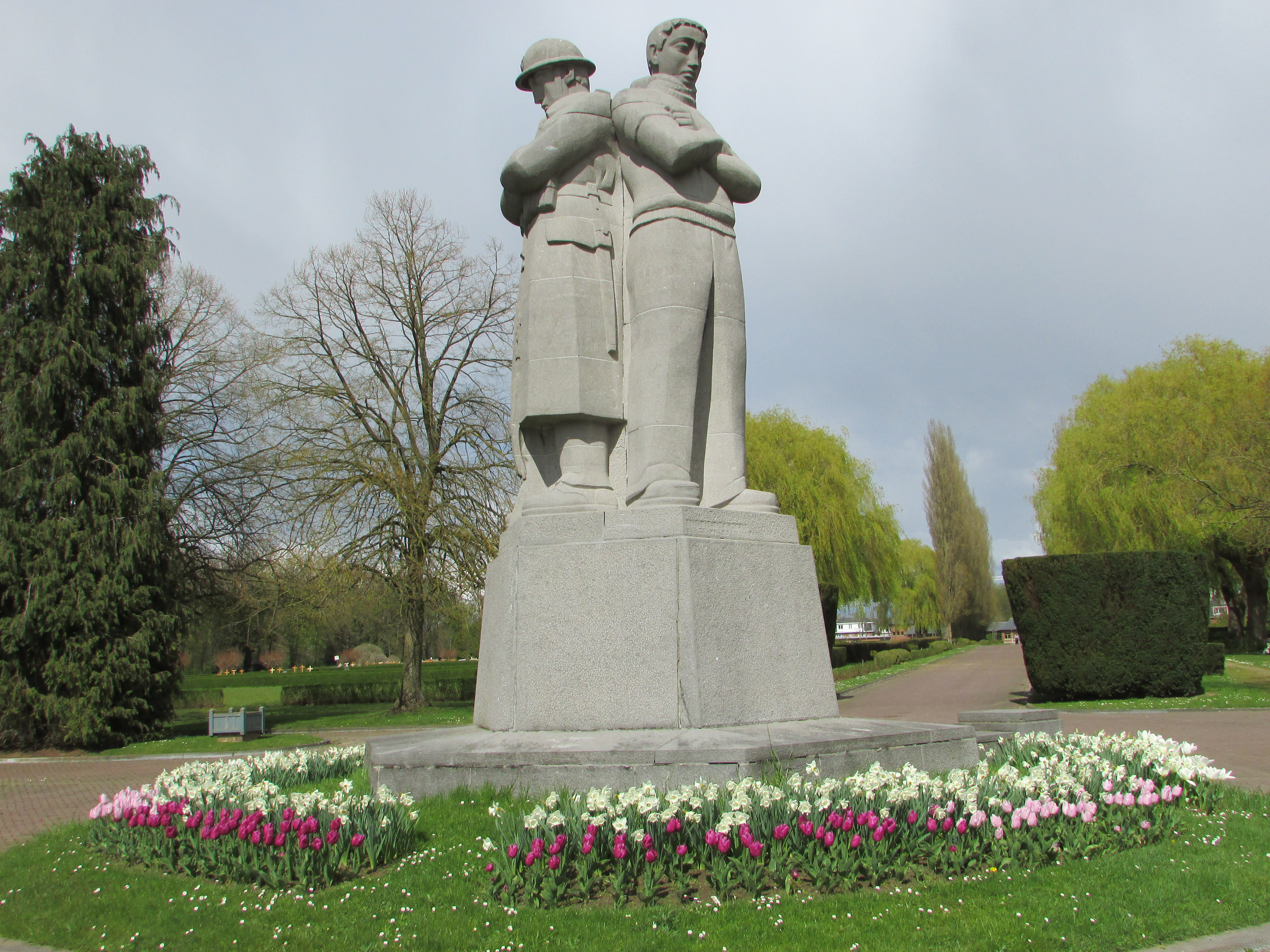
Pro Patria monument by Jos De Decker, in the Field of Honour

Personalities buried there include:

- Patrice Braut (1970–2001), only Belgian victim of the September 11 attacks
- Prosper-Henri Devos (1889–1914), novelist and translator, died during World War I
- Georges Moreau (1863–1903), mayor from 1884 to 1919
- Marius Renard (1869–1948), mayor from 1939 to 1946
- Philippe Thys (1889–1971), cyclist and three-time Tour de France winner
- Jean Van Lierde (1894–1945), police officer, honoured as member of the Resistance and "victim of Nazi barbarity"
- Jérôme Justin Van Lint (1819–1889), mayor from 1872 to 1884
- Constant Vanden Stock (1914–2008), president of R.S.C. Anderlecht
- Raymond Vander Bruggen (1899–1937), alderman

== See also ==
- List of cemeteries in Belgium
- Brussels Cemetery
- Ixelles Cemetery
- Laeken Cemetery
- Molenbeek-Saint-Jean Cemetery
- Saint-Josse-ten-Noode Cemetery
- Schaerbeek Cemetery
