= William Lloyd (British Army officer) =

- Born: December 2, 1778
- Died: July 29, 1815 (aged 36)
- Military career
- Allegiance: United Kingdom
- Branch: British Army
- Service years: 1795–1815
- Rank: Major
- Unit: Royal Artillery
- Conflicts: Napoleonic Wars (DOW)

William John Lloyd (2 December 1778 – 29 July 1815) was a British Army officer wounded at the Battle of Waterloo on June 18 1815.

He was the son of Major John Lloyd, of the 46th Regiment of Foot, who had been aide-de-camp to General Sir Henry Clinton during the American War of Independence, and Corbetta, daughter of the Venerable George Holcombe, Archdeacon of Carmarthen.

Lloyd joined the Royal Artillery as a second-lieutenant on 6 March 1795. He was promoted to first-lieutenant on 18 June 1796; to captain-lieutenant on 12 September 1803; to second-captain on 19 July 1804; to captain on 22 October 1806 and to brevet major on 4 June 1814.

After commanding his eponymous brigade at the Battle of Waterloo, Lloyd died in Brussels on 29 July 1815 as a result of wounds received in the battle.

His name is inscribed on a plaque to the dead of the artillery inside St. Joseph's Church in Waterloo.

Lloyd is one of the soldiers commemorated on the British Waterloo Campaign Monument in Brussels Cemetery, although he was 37 at the time of his death, not 35 as inscribed.
