= Brussels Cemetery =

Cemetery in Brussels, Belgium

- Cimetière de Bruxelles (French); Begraafplaats van Brussel (Dutch)
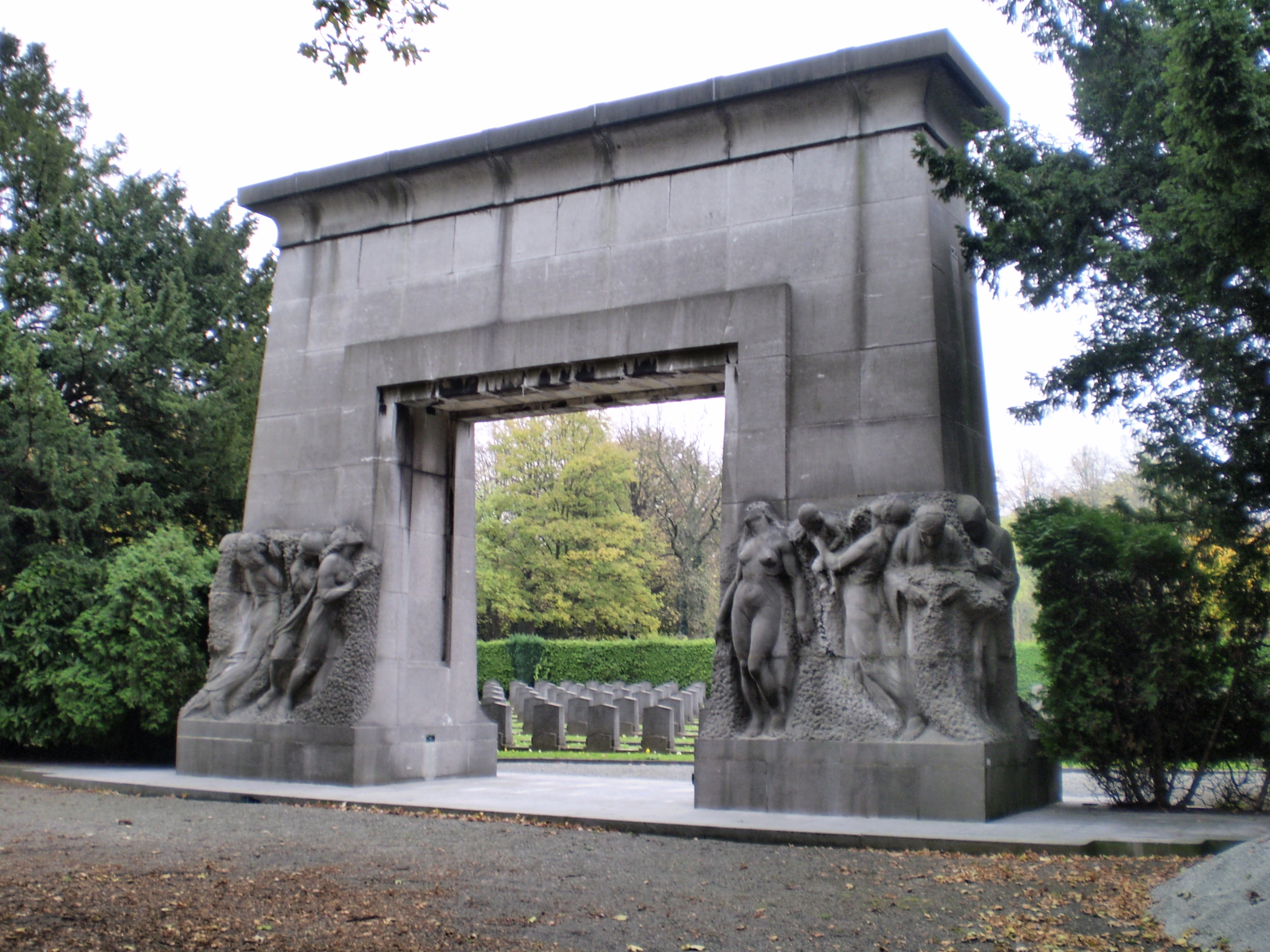
- Portal in honour of Belgian soldiers of World War I, designed by François Malfait, 1928
- Interactive map of Brussels Cemetery

Details
- Established: 1874
- Location: Evere, Brussels-Capital Region
- Country: Belgium
- Coordinates: 50°52′11″N 4°25′22″E
- Type: Public, non-denominational
- Size: 30 hectares (74 acres)
- No. of graves: 40 parks. Park 22 has about 1000 graves most have two interments in each pit.

Brussels Cemetery (French: Cimetière de Bruxelles; Dutch: Begraafplaats van Brussel) is a cemetery belonging to the City of Brussels in Brussels, Belgium. Located in the neighbouring municipality of Evere, rather than in the City of Brussels proper, it is adjacent to Schaerbeek Cemetery and Evere Cemetery, but should not be confused with either.

The grounds include many war memorials, including a large monument to the soldiers of the Battle of Waterloo by the sculptor Jacques de Lalaing.

== Notable interments ==
Personalities buried there include:

- Jules Anspach (1829–1879), mayor from 1863 to 1879
- Charles de Brouckère (1796–1860), mayor from 1848 to 1860
- Charles Buls (1837–1914), mayor from 1881 to 1899
- Johnny Claes (1916–1956), racing driver
- Jacques-Louis David (1748–1825), French painter
- César De Paepe (1841–1890), physician and political figure
- Adrien de Gerlache (1866–1934), explorer
- William Howe De Lancey (1778–1815), British Army officer
- Robert Goldschmidt (1877–1935), scientist
- Marcellin Jobard (1792–1861), lithographer, photographer, journalist and inventor
- Adolphe Max (1869–1939), mayor from 1909 to 1939
- Adolphe Quetelet (1796–1874), astronomer and mathematician
- George Thompson VC (1920–1945), Royal Air Force aviator
- Jeanne Van Calck (1897–1906), infanticide victim
- François van Campenhout (1779–1848), composer and violinist
- Henri Van Dievoet (1869–1931), architect
- Jules Van Dievoet (1844–1917), barrister at the Court de Cassation of Belgium
- Charles van Lerberghe (1861–1907), symbolist author
- Pierre-Théodore Verhaegen (1796–1862), founder of the Free University of Brussels

== British Waterloo Campaign Monument ==
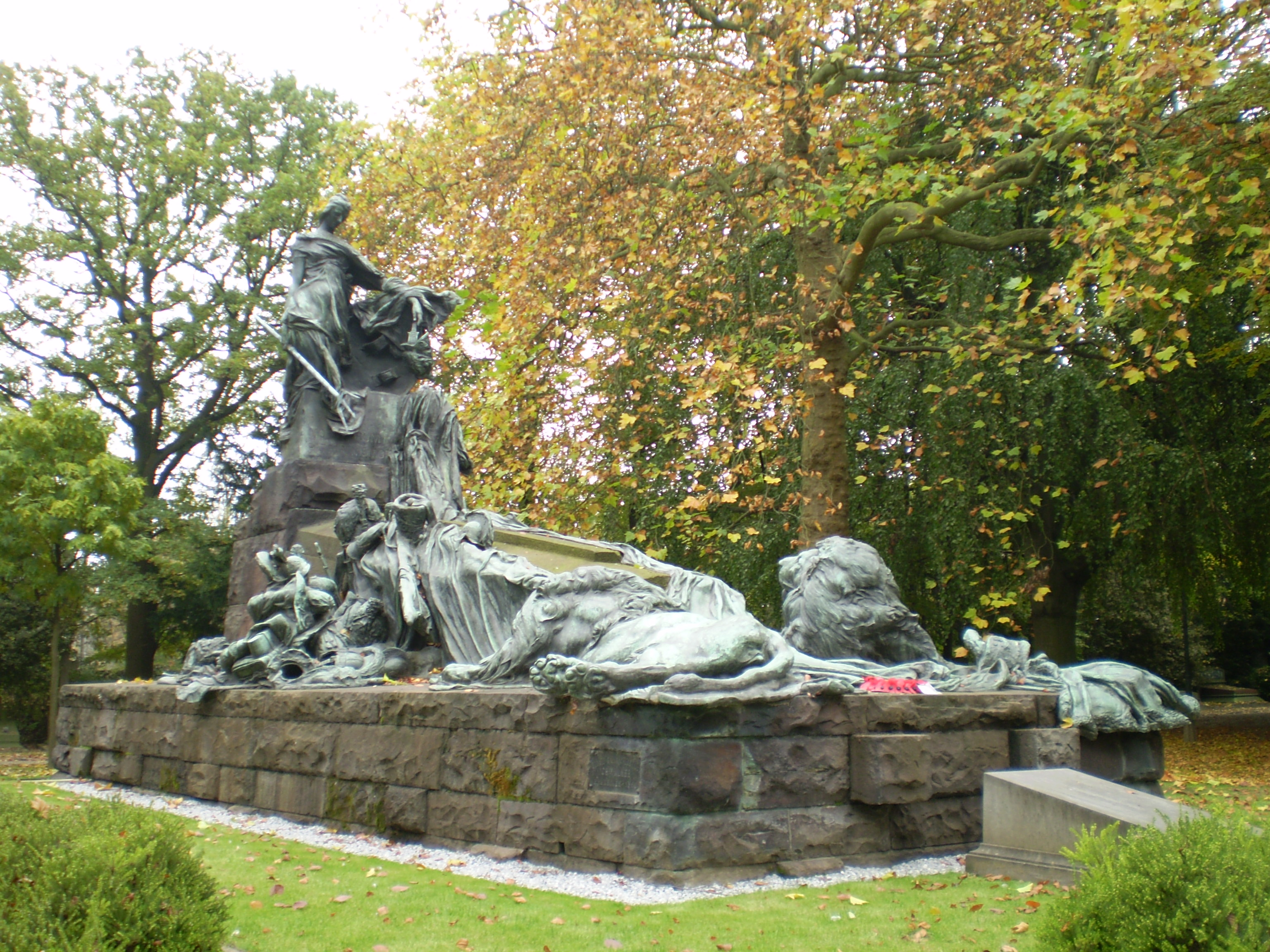
British Waterloo Memorial

The idea of bringing together the remains of British officers that had been killed during the Waterloo Campaign of 1815, was first suggested in 1861. In 1882, the City Council of Brussels approved a suggestion to donate 30 square metres (320 sq ft) of the cemetery to re-bury British officers whose graves were in Brussels or around the battlefields of Waterloo and Quatre Bras. In 1888, a public subscription was launched by Queen Victoria in the United Kingdom to finance a suitable monument. The resulting sculpture by Jacques de Lalaing is a large edifice of bronze figures on a plinth of rusticated stone blocks. It depicts Britannia with lowered helmet and trident, surrounded by discarded British weapons, uniforms and equipment. Three lions lie at her feet; one is sleeping. Attached to the sides of the plinth are circular shields bearing the names of the regiments that fought in the campaign. Amongst the inscriptions is MORITUORUM PATRIA MEMOR ("I remember the country of the dead"). The monument was unveiled by the Duke of Cambridge on 26 August 1890.

Below the monument is a crypt with 16 niches containing 17 bodies, which were transferred there between 1890 and 1894. Four of these were killed at Quatre Bras, the remainder at Waterloo, including Captain John Lucie Blackman of the Coldstream Regiment of Foot Guards, who was killed at Hougomont on the day of the battle. The exception, and the only Non-Commissioned Officer, is Sergeant-Major Edward Cotton (7th Hussars), who survived the battle to become a guide for tourists to the battlefield and was buried at Hougomont after his death in 1849. The remainder are all British Army officers and include Colonel Sir William Howe De Lancey (Deputy Quartermaster-General of the British Army in Belgium), Colonel Edward Stables and Lieutenant-Colonel William Henry Milnes (both 1st Foot Guards), Lieutenant-Colonel Sir Alexander Gordon (3rd Foot Guards) and Major William Lloyd (Royal Artillery).

== British Commonwealth War Graves (20th century) ==
The cemetery contains the war graves of 53 British Commonwealth service personnel of World War I and 587 from World War II. Most of the graves from the former war, all within Plot X, are of bodies of prisoners of war exhumed from Germany and reburied here by the Canadian Corps in April 1919. Those of the latter war are of troops of the British Expeditionary Force in Belgium in May 1940 before the retreat to Dunkirk, aircrew crashed or shot down over Belgium, and, predominately, those on lines of communication duties after the liberation of Brussels in September 1944. The Commonwealth War Graves Commission are responsible for these graves as well as for 35 Foreign National service burials and five non-World War service burials.

== Belgian Airmen's Field of Honour ==
This Field of Honour, located within the cemetery, was created to inter Belgian airmen who died in World War II. It is administered and maintained by the Belgian Ministry of Defence, although the Commonwealth War Graves Commission commemoratively lists 84 of the airmen buried here who died serving in British Commonwealth air forces following the fall of Belgium to Nazi German occupation in 1940. In all, over 200 airmen are commemorated there with headstones. Around 30 of those, whose headstones are marked as disparu (i.e. missing), have no known grave.

== See also ==
- List of cemeteries in Belgium
- Anderlecht Cemetery
- Ixelles Cemetery
- Laeken Cemetery
- Molenbeek-Saint-Jean Cemetery
- Saint-Josse-ten-Noode Cemetery
- Schaerbeek Cemetery
