= Tuileries British Commonwealth War Graves Commission Cemetery =

WWI CWGC cemetery in Ypres, Belgium

Tuileries British
- Commonwealth War Graves Commission
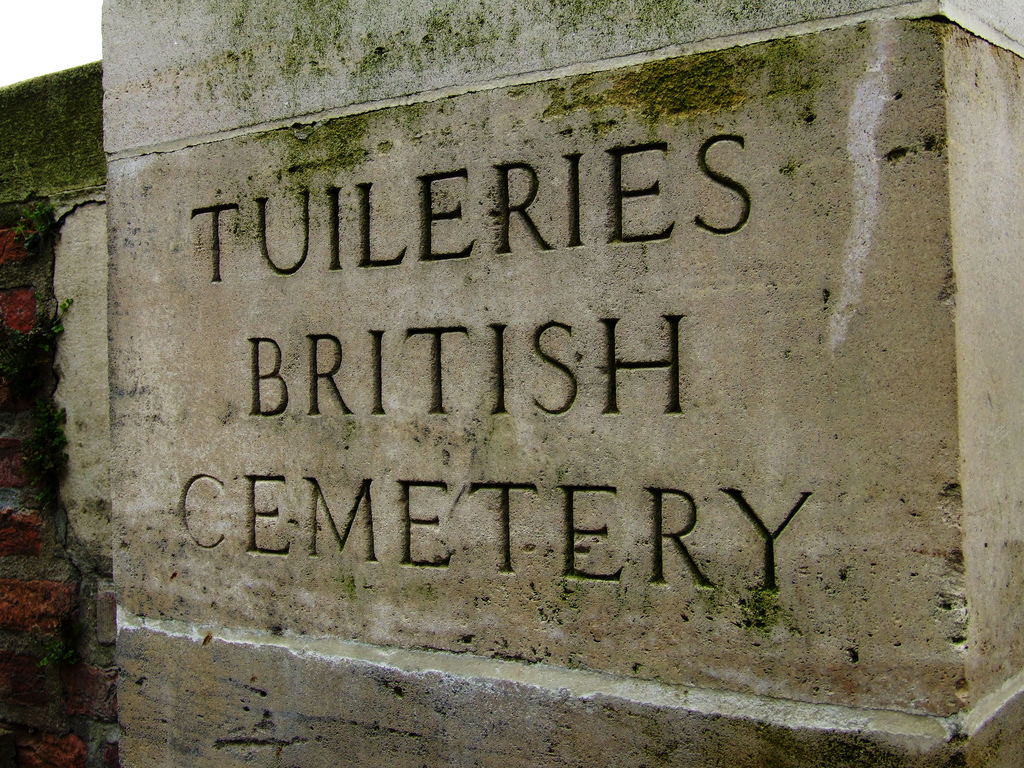
- Used for those deceased 1915
- Established: 1915
- Location: 50°50′23″N 02°55′11″E near Ypres, West Flanders, Belgium
- Designed by: W C Von Berg
- Total burials: 98

Burials by nation
- Allies of World War I: United Kingdom: 95; France: 3

Burials by war
- World War I: 98

Tuileries British Cemetery is a Commonwealth War Graves Commission burial ground for the dead of the First World War located near Ypres (Ieper) in Belgium on the Western Front.

The cemetery grounds were assigned to the United Kingdom in perpetuity by King Albert I of Belgium in recognition of the sacrifices made by the British Empire in the defence and liberation of Belgium during the war.

== Foundation ==
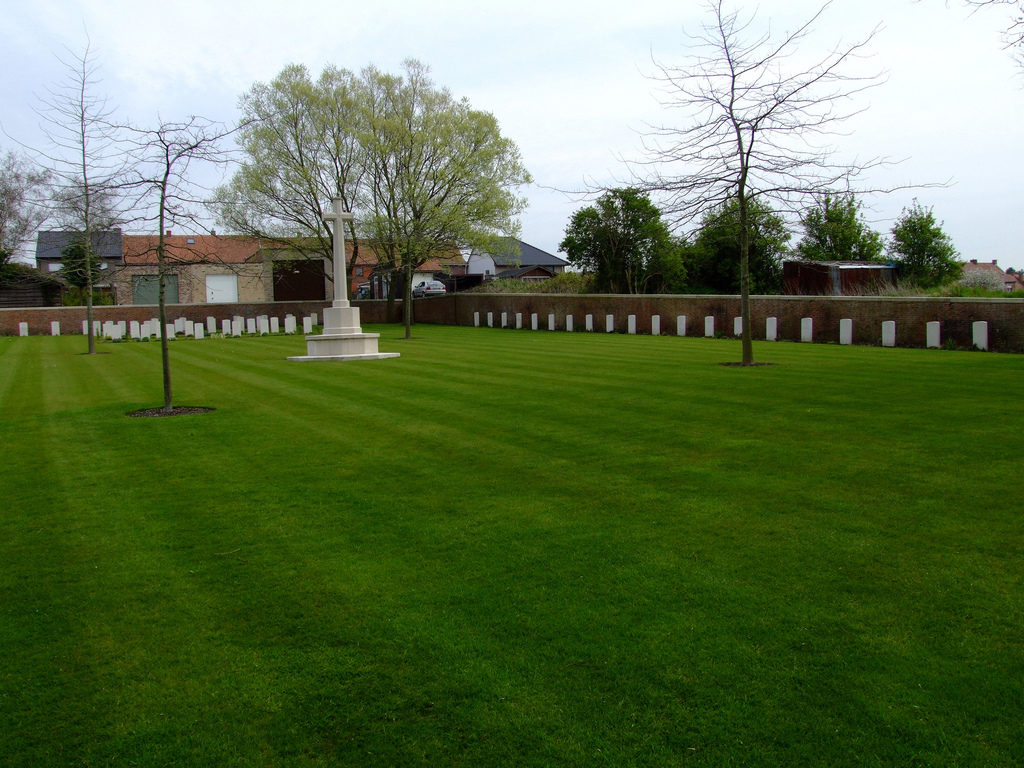
The cemetery's Cross of Sacrifice

This cemetery's name means "tile factory", as it was begun in the grounds of a tile works in 1915. The chimneys of the tile works were very visible and provided a means for the opposing side to calibrate their shells. This led to the cemetery itself being heavily shelled and the sites of most of the original graves were lost. Most of the gravestones are positioned around the edges of the otherwise empty-looking cemetery, and are marked "known to be buried in this cemetery", with the default additional phrase "Their glory shall not be blotted out", a line suggested by Rudyard Kipling.
