= Divisional Cemetery =

CWGC cemetery in Ypres, Belgium

Divisional
- Commonwealth War Graves Commission
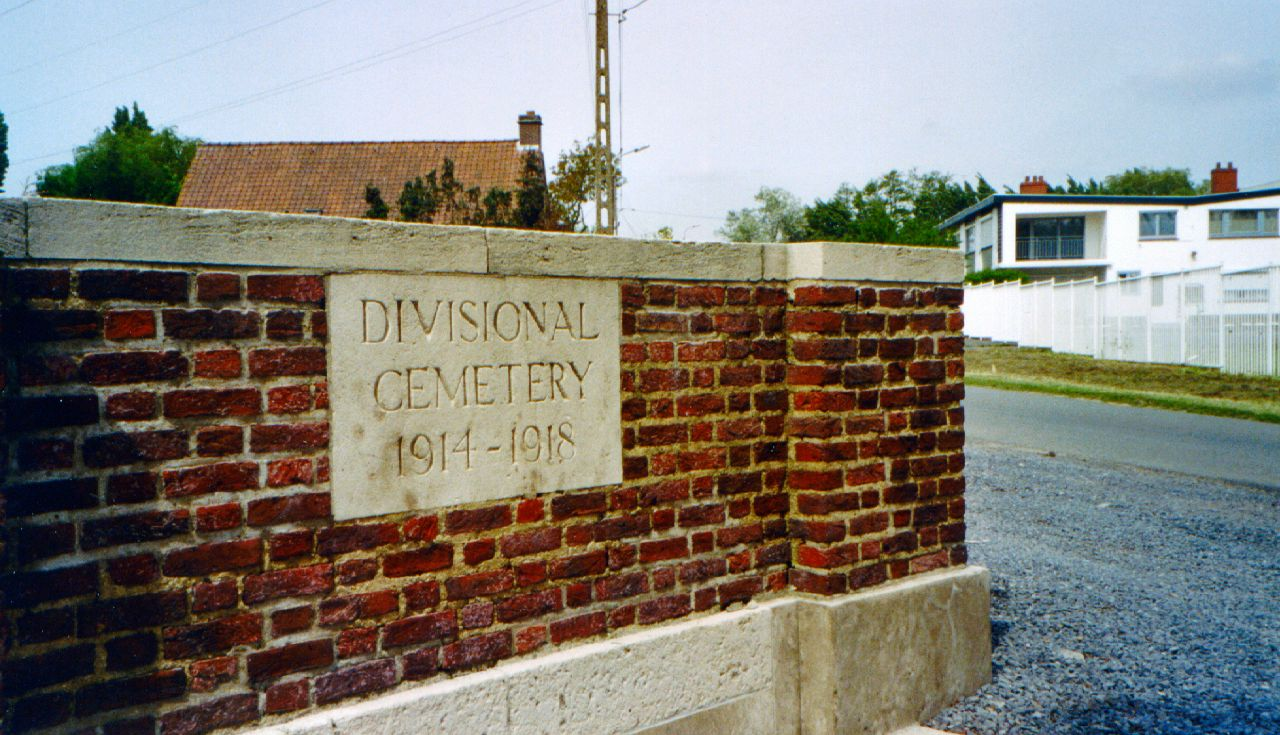
- Used for those deceased 1915–1916 and 1917
- Established: April 1915
- Location: 50°50′54″N 02°51′28″E near Ypres, West Flanders, Belgium
- Designed by: Sir Edwin Lutyens
- Total burials: 283
- Unknowns: 6

Burials by nation
- Allied Powers: United Kingdom: 192; Canada: 26; New Zealand: 65

Burials by war
- World War I: 283

Divisional Cemetery is a Commonwealth War Graves Commission burial ground for the dead of the First World War located in Vlamertinge at Ypres on the Western Front in Belgium.

The cemetery grounds were assigned to the United Kingdom in perpetuity by King Albert I of Belgium in recognition of the sacrifices made by the British Empire in the defence and liberation of Belgium during the war.

== Foundation ==
The cemetery was founded in April 1915. The cemetery contains the bodies of 23 troops of the 2nd Duke of Wellington's (West Riding) Regiment, killed when German forces attacked and took Hill 60 with the use of poison gas.

Fighting then moved away from the Vlamertinge area, returning in July 1917 during the Third Battle of Ypres and causing the cemetery to be reopened. It was then used by artillery units until the line moved away again later that year.

The cemetery was designed by Sir Edwin Lutyens.
