= Divisional Collecting Post Commonwealth War Graves Commission Cemetery and Extension =

CWGC cemetery in Ypres, Belgium

Division Collecting Post Cemetery and Extension
- Commonwealth War Graves Commission
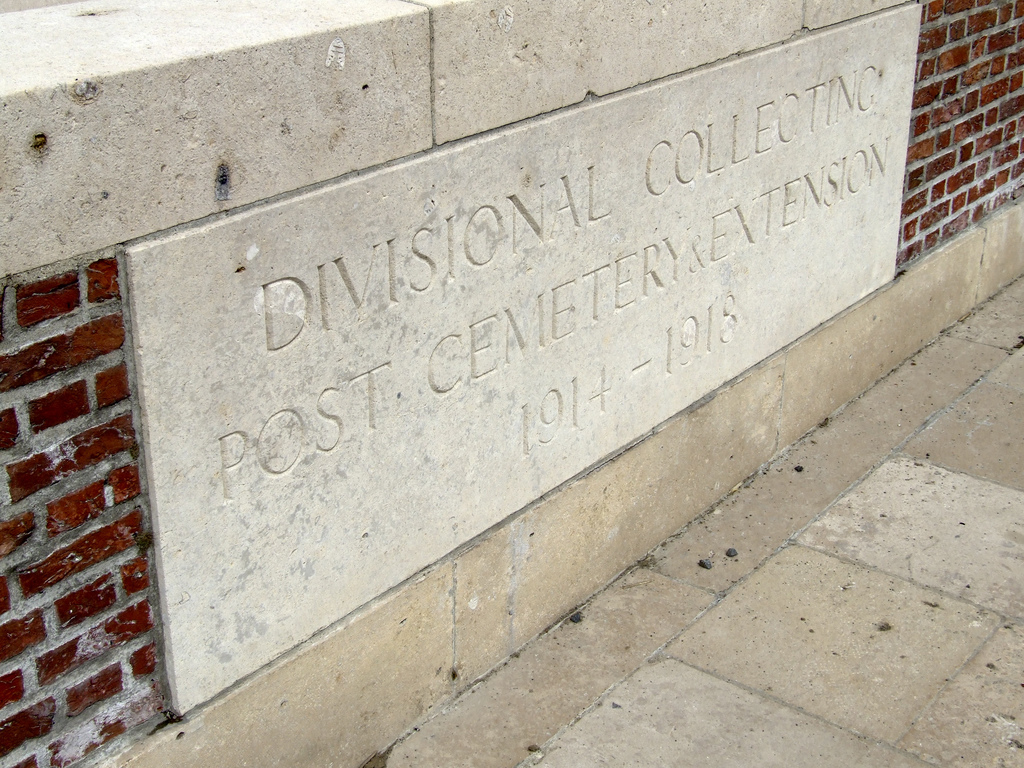
- Used for those deceased 1917–1918
- Established: August 1917
- Location: 50°52′28″N 02°53′38″E near Ypres, West Flanders, Belgium
- Designed by: Sir Reginald Blomfield
- Total burials: 765

Burials by nation
- Allies of World War I: United Kingdom: 581; Australia: 102; Canada: 75; New Zealand: 5; South Africa: 1; Central Powers: Germany: 1

Burials by war
- World War I: 765

Divisional Collecting Post Cemetery and Extension is a Commonwealth War Graves Commission burial ground for the dead of the First World War located near Ypres (Dutch: Ieper) in Belgium on the Western Front.

The cemetery grounds were assigned to the United Kingdom in perpetuity by King Albert I of Belgium in recognition of the sacrifices made by the British Empire in the defence and liberation of Belgium during the war.

== Foundation ==
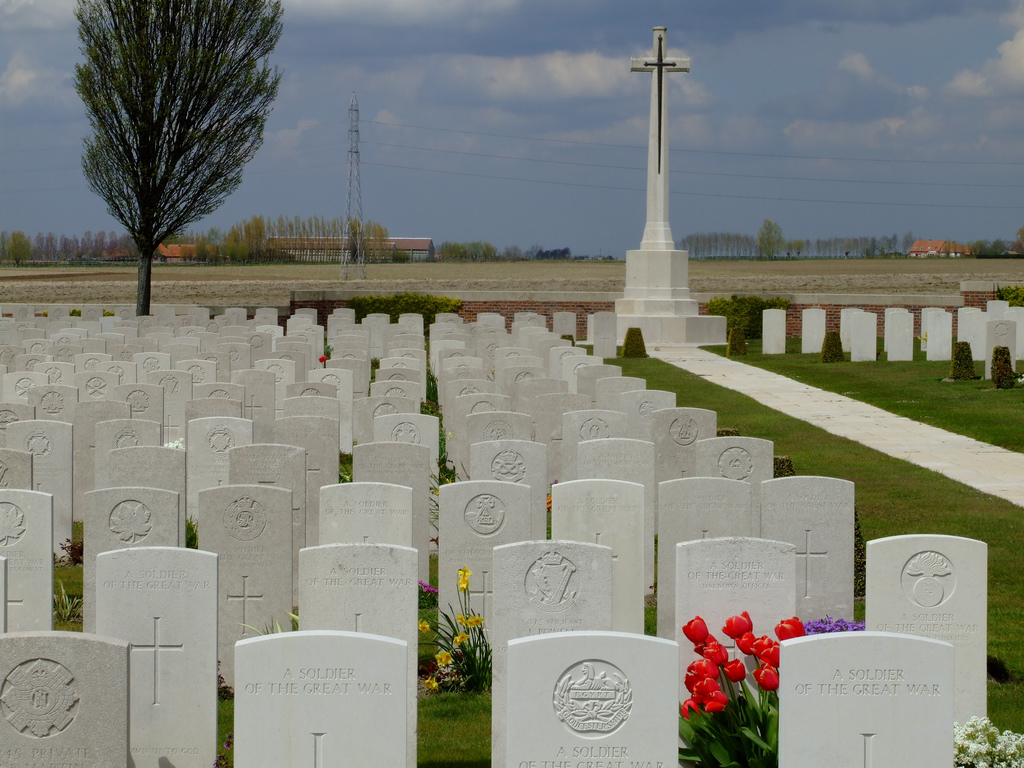
The "War Cross" or Cross of Sacrifice.

The cemetery was established by field ambulances of the 48th (South Midland) Division and the 58th (London) Division in August 1917 and was used until January 1918. From 1924 to 1926, after the armistice, the cemetery was enlarged by concentrating battlefield graves and those from smaller cemeteries.

The cemetery and its extension were considered separate sites until their records were combined in 2001.

The cemetery was designed by Sir Reginald Blomfield.
