= Railway Chateau Cemetery =

WWI CWGC cemetery in Ypres, Belgium

- Commonwealth War Graves Commission
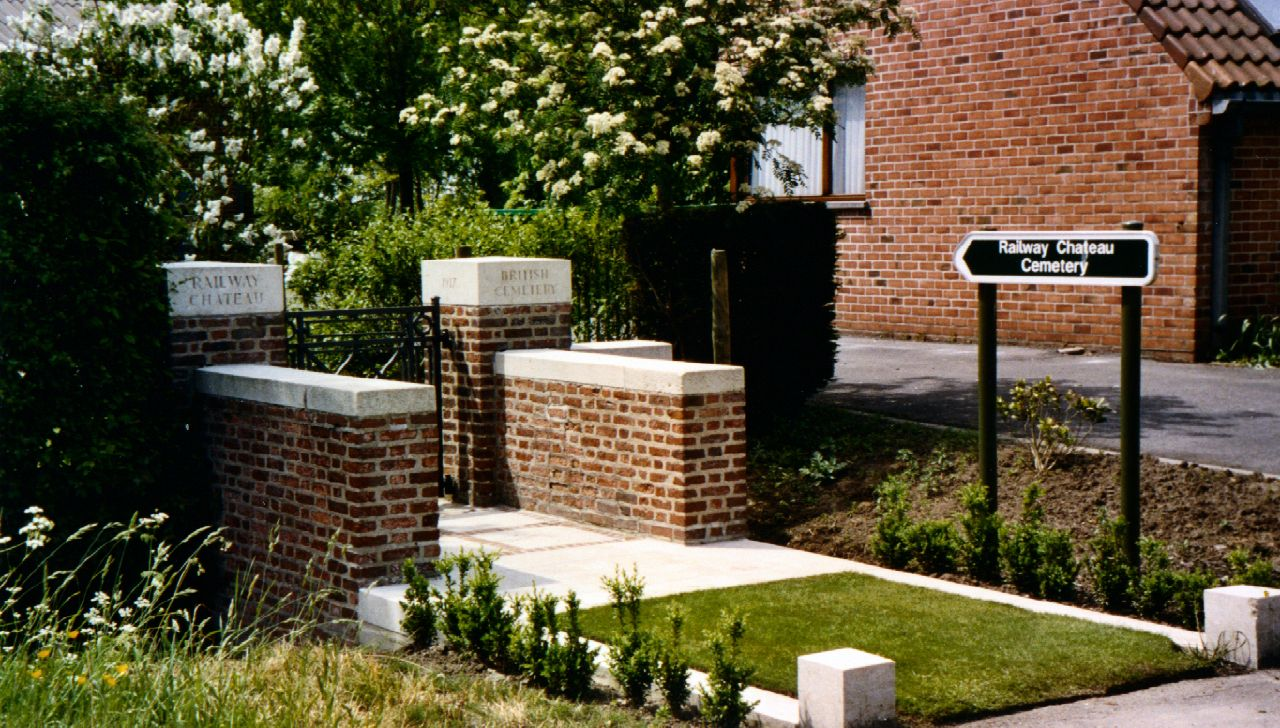
- Used for those deceased 1914–1916
- Established: 1914
- Location: 50°51′13″N 02°51′24″E near Ypres, West Flanders, Belgium
- Designed by: W H Cowlishaw
- Total burials: 105
- Unknowns: 6

Burials by nation
- Allied Powers: United Kingdom 105

Burials by war
- World War I: 105
- Statistics source: WW1Cemeteries.com and CWGC

Railway Chateau Cemetery (referred to as Railway Chateau British Cemetery on the entrance stone) is a Commonwealth War Graves Commission (CWGC) burial ground for the dead of the First World War located in Belgium in the Ypres Salient on the Western Front.

The cemetery grounds were assigned to the United Kingdom in perpetuity by King Albert I of Belgium in recognition of the sacrifices made by the British Empire in the defence and liberation of Belgium during the war.

== Foundation ==
This small cemetery was originally established as Augustine Street Cabaret Cemetery in November 1914. It was also known as L.4 Post Cemetery.

The cemetery was designed by W H Cowlishaw.
