= Ramparts (Lille Gate) Cemetery =

WWI CWGC cemetery in Ypres, Belgium

Ramparts Cemetery (Lille gate)
- Commonwealth War Graves Commission
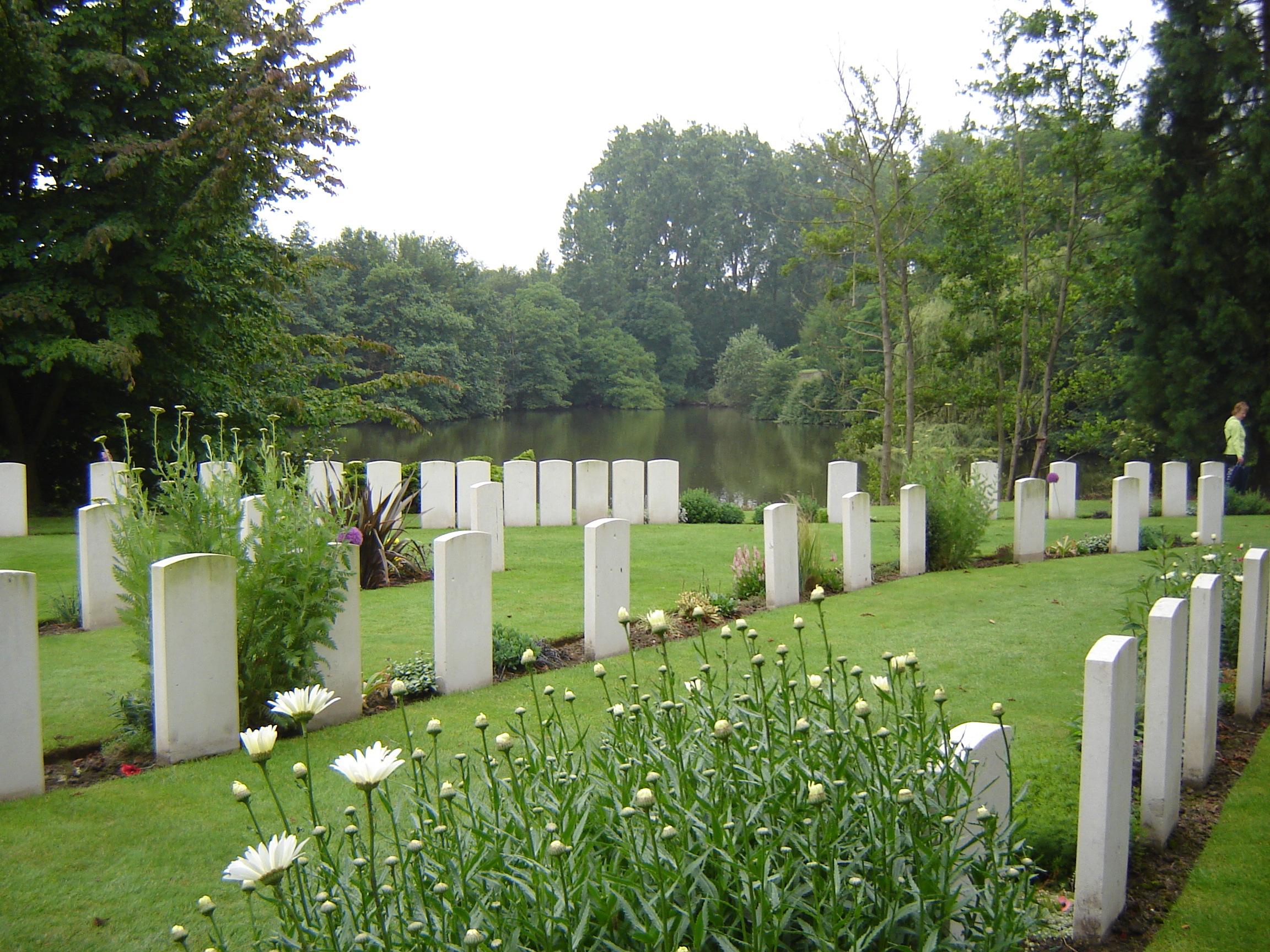
- Used for those deceased 1914–1918
- Established: 1914
- Location: 50°50′41″N 02°53′21″E near Ypres, West Flanders, Belgium
- Designed by: Sir Reginald Blomfield
- Total burials: 198
- Unknowns: 5

Burials by nation
- Allied Powers: United Kingdom: 153; Canada: 10; Australia: 11; New Zealand: 14

Burials by war
- World War I: 198

Ramparts Cemetery (Lille Gate) is a Commonwealth War Graves Commission (CWGC) burial ground for the dead of the First World War located in the Ypres Salient on the Western Front.

The cemetery grounds were assigned to the United Kingdom in perpetuity by King Albert I of Belgium in recognition of the sacrifices made by the British Empire in the defence and liberation of Belgium during the war.

== Foundation ==
This small cemetery is the only CWGC burial ground within the ancient walls of Ypres. The cemetery was begun in November 1914 by French troops defending the city and was used by Commonwealth troops from February 1915 until April 1918, by which time the Western Front had moved away from Ypres.

At the end of the war, the French graves were removed and concentrated in the nearby Ypres Necropole National French cemetery. Of the British and Commonwealth troops buried here, all but ten are named; in the case of five of the unidentified, the nationality could not be ascertained.

The cemetery was designed by Sir Reginald Blomfield who was also responsible for the nearby Menin Gate memorial.

== Notable graves ==
The cemetery contains the graves of 198 soldiers. Amongst these are the graves of six New Zealand troops killed simultaneously by the same shell. These graves are symbolically grouped together.

Rose Coombs, who did much to popularise Ypres and the Salient for tourists and pilgrims through her book "Before Endeavours Fade" (ISBN 0-900913-85-1), had her ashes scattered in this cemetery in 1991.
