= List of people from the London Borough of Hammersmith and Fulham =

The list of people from the London Borough of Hammersmith and Fulham includes residents who were either born or dwelt for a substantial period within the borders of this modern London borough. It does not comprise notable individuals who only studied at educational institutions in the area.

== Academia and research ==
- Joseph Addison, essayist, poet, playwright and politician; from Fulham
- Cyril Aldred, Egyptologist, art historian, and author; born in Fulham
- Arthur Blomfield, architect. Son of Charles James Blomfield and brother of Lucy Elizabeth Bather and Alfred Blomfield; born at Fulham Palace.
- Valentine Britten, gramophone librarian for the BBC; born in Fulham
- Frank Broadbent, architect born in Fulham
- Tony Brooker, computer scientist known for developing the Mark 1 Autocode; born in Fulham
- William John Burchell, explorer, naturalist, traveller, artist, and author born in Fulham
- William Butts, physician to Henry VIII of England; born in either Fulham or Norfolk
- Reginald Foster Dagnall, engineer and aircraft designer born in Fulham
- Robert Dunstan, medical doctor and political activist; lived in Fulham
- Elizabeth Eger, reader in the Department of English at King's College London
- Charles James Feret, newspaper editor and writer; lived in Fulham. Author of an exhaustive three volume history of Fulham.
- Thomas Elliot Harrison, engineer born in Fulham.
- Muriel Nissel, statistician and civil servant, born in Fulham.
- Christian O'Brien, exploration geologist and author, born in Fulham.
- Melville Henry Massue, genealogist and author, born in Fulham.
- Ethel Strudwick, headteacher and Liberal Party activist, born in Fulham.
- Peter van Geersdaele, conservator-restorer, born in Fulham.
- Susan Greenfield, Baroness Greenfield, biologist and neuroscientist, born in Hammersmith.

== Arts and entertainment ==
- Julie Alexander, model and actress, born in Fulham.
- Alfie Allen, actor, born in Hammersmith; brother of singer-songwriter Lily Allen.
- Lily Allen, singer-songwriter, born in Hammersmith; sister of actor Alfie Allen.
- Bob Andrews, rock guitarist, born in Fulham.
- Leonard Appelbee, painter and printmaker, born in Fulham.
- Bernard Archard, actor, born in Fulham.
- Neal Arden, actor and writer, born in Fulham.
- Maureen Baker, fashion designer who designed the wedding dress worn by Princess Anne for her wedding to Mark Phillips. Baker grew up in Hammersmith.
- Matt Barber, actor, born in Hammersmith.
- Sacha Baron Cohen, actor and comedian, born in Hammersmith.
- Mischa Barton, actress, born in Hammersmith.
- Lucy Elizabeth Bather, children's writer and daughter of Charles James Blomfield; born in Fulham
- Melissa Benn, journalist and writer, born in Hammersmith; sister of politician Hilary Benn.
- John Berry, illustrator, born in Hammersmith.
- Terry Bickers, musician, grew up in Fulham.
- John Bindon, actor and bodyguard, born in Fulham.
- Frederick Bradnum, radio dramatist, producer, and director born in Fulham.
- Paul Brett, classic rock guitarist, born in Fulham.
- Christina Broom, Scottish photographer credited as "the UK's first female press photographer"; lived on Munster Road in Fulham.
- Irene Mary Browne, sculptor and potter, born in Fulham
- Florence Brudenell-Bruce, model and former Bollywood actress, grew up in Fulham.
- Kenneth Budd, mural artist, born in Fulham.
- Edward Burne-Jones, artist and designer associated with the phase of the Pre-Raphaelite movement. Lived in North End, Fulham.
- Georgiana Burne-Jones, artist and biographer of her husband, Edward Burne-Jones. One of the MacDonald sisters and mother of artist Philip Burne-Jones. Lived in North End, Fulham.
- Scarlett Byrne, actress, born in Hammersmith. She is known for portraying Pansy Parkinson in the Harry Potter films.
- Bruce Byron, actor, born in Fulham.
- Richard Campbell, classical musician, born in Hammersmith.
- Lisa Coleman, actress, born in Hammersmith.
- Fay Compton, actress, born in Fulham; sister of actress Viola Compton.
- Viola Compton, actress, born in Fulham; sister of actress Fay Compton.
- Michael Cook, Canadian playwright, born in Fulham.
- Jill Craigie, one of Britain's earliest women's documentary makers; born in Fulham.
- Elizabeth Craven, author and playwright. Daughter of Augustus Berkeley, 4th Earl of Berkeley, and second wife of Charles Alexander, Margrave of Brandenburg-Ansbach, with whom she lived on their properties in Fulham and Hammersmith.
- Ross Cullum, composer, record producer, songwriter, born in Fulham.
- Benedict Cumberbatch, actor, born in Hammersmith.
- James D'Arcy, actor, raised in Fulham.
- Jill Dando, journalist, television presenter, and newsreader, lived in Fulham.
- Ben de Pear, editor for Channel 4 News, born in Hammersmith.
- Cara Delevingne, model, actress, and singer, born in Hammersmith.
- Lily Donaldson, model.
- Benjamin Rawlinson Faulkner, portrait-painter; lived in Fulham.
- Meriel Forbes, actress, born in Fulham.
- John Ford, singer-songwriter, and musician, born in Fulham.
- Elliot John Gleave, musician, singer, rapper, and songwriter, better known by his stage name, Example; born in Hammersmith.
- Emilia Fox, actress, born in Hammersmith; sister of actor Freddie Fox.
- Freddie Fox, actor, born in Hammersmith; brother of actress Emilia Fox.
- Phoebe Fox, actress, born in Hammersmith.
- Hugh Grant, actor and film producer, born in Hammersmith.
- Sienna Guillory, actress and former model; grew up in Fulham.
- Toni Halliday, musician, born in Parsons Green.
- Andy Hamilton, comedian, actor, director, and writer, born in Fulham.
- Philip Harben, celebrity chef, born in Fulham.
- Tom Hardy, actor and producer, born in Hammersmith.
- Miranda Hart, actress, comedian, and writer, lives in Hammersmith.
- Sam Hazeldine, actor.
- Daisy Head, actress, born in Fulham. Sister of actress Emily Head.
- Emily Head, actress, born in Fulham. Sister of actress Daisy Head.
- Leslie S. Hiscott, film director and screenwriter.
- John Hollis, actor, born in Fulham.
- Norah Howard, actress, born in Fulham.
- Claude Hulbert, actor and comic, born in Fulham.
- Konnie Huq, television presenter, born in Hammersmith. Sister of politician Rupa Huq.
- Tracy Hyde, actress, born in Fulham.
- Caron Keating, television presenter, born in Fulham.
- Judith Keppel, first person to win one million pounds on the British television game show Who Wants to Be a Millionaire?.
- Nick Knight, fashion photographer, born in Hammersmith.
- Bryan Langley, cinematographer, born in Fulham.
- Arthur Lovegrove, actor and playwright, born in Fulham.
- Robert Lynn, director, born in Fulham.
- Tony Macaulay, author, musical theatre composer, and songwriter, born in Fulham.
- Jessica Martin, actress, singer, and impressionist, born in Fulham.
- James May, television presenter and journalist, born in Hammersmith.
- Paul Merton, writer, actor, and comedian, born in Parsons Green.
- Emily Mortimer, actress and screenwriter, born in Hammersmith.
- Maurice Murphy, former principal trumpet for the London Symphony Orchestra, born in Hammersmith.
- Sophia Myles, actress, born in Hammersmith.
- Billy Nicholls, singer-songwriter, composer, record producer, and musical director.
- Leslie Norman, film director, producer and editor, born in Fulham.
- Obenewa, singer-songwriter and multi-instrumentalist, born in Hammersmith.
- John Osborne, playwright, screenwriter, and actor, born in Fulham.
- Zoe Palmer, actress, born in Fulham.
- Rosamund Pike, actress, born in Hammersmith.
- Bel Powley, actress.
- Duffy Power, blues and rock and roll singer, born in Fulham.
- Daniel Radcliffe, Actor, Born in Hammersmith, Now lives in Fulham, alternating between his home there and his home in New York.
- Robert Rankin, novelist, born in Parsons Green
- Samuel Richardson, writer and printer, lived in Parsons Green.
- Anastasia Robinson, operatic soprano, and later contralto, of the Baroque era; lived in Parsons Green following her retirement.
- Albert Sammons, violinist and composer, born in Fulham.
- Mim Scala, talent agent, grew up in Fulham.
- Mary Ann Sieghart, journalist and broadcaster, born in Hammersmith.
- Bob Simmons, stunt man, born in Fulham.
- Peter Sinfield, poet and songwriter, born in Fulham.
- Don Smoothey, stage actor, variety entertainer, and comic; born in Fulham.
- Harry South, jazz pianist, composer, and arranger, born in Fulham.
- Bernadette Strachan, author, born in Fulham.
- Janet Street-Porter, media personality, journalist and broadcaster; grew up in Fulham and attended school in Parsons Green.
- Estelle, singer-songwriter, rapper, and actress, born and raised in Hammersmith.
- Ken Sykora, jazz guitarist and radio presenter, born in Fulham.
- Valerie Taylor, actress, born in Fulham.
- Peter Vince, sound engineer, born in Fulham.
- Stan Webb, guitarist, born in Fulham.
- Leslie Arthur Wilcox, artist, born in Fulham.
- Alan Wilder, musician, composer, arranger, and record producer, born in Hammersmith.
- Roy Williams, playwright, born in Fulham.
- Freya Wilson, child actress.
- Alan Winstanley, record producer and songwriter, born in Fulham.
- Adam Buxton, actor, comedian, podcaster and writer, born in Shepherd's Bush

== Business ==
- Claude Kirby, businessman, amateur sportsman, and association football executive, lived in Fulham.
- Phil Vincent, motorcycle designer and manufacturer, founder of Vincent Motorcycles; born in Fulham.
- George Volkert, aircraft designer, born in Fulham.
- Roger Whiteside, businessman and CEO of Greggs, born in Fulham.

== Military and law enforcement ==
- Euston Baker, British Army in both world wars, born in Fulham.
- Tommy Butler, Detective Chief Superintendent in the Metropolitan Police in London, known for leading the team of detectives that investigated the Great Train Robbery in 1963; born in Fulham.
- Peter Gerald Charles Dickens, Royal Navy officer during World War II and a great-grandson of Charles Dickens; born in Fulham.
- John Thornton Down, British Army officer, born in Fulham.
- Edward Dwyer, British Army officer, born in Fulham.
- Claude Fenner, first Inspector-general of police of Malaysia; born in Fulham.
- G. Hermon Gill, Royal Australian Navy officer, mariner, journalist and naval historian, born in Fulham.
- Thomas Le Mesurier, flying ace of World War I, born in Shepherd's Bush.
- Arthur Lillie, soldier in the British Indian Army and a writer, born in Fulham.
- Henry Lukin, South African military commander, born in Fulham.
- Norman Morley, Naval Reserve officer who served in both World Wars, becoming the most decorated reserve officer in the Royal Navy. Born in Fulham.
- Charles Napier, flying ace of World War I, born in Shepherd's Bush.
- Jimmy Rawnsley, Royal Air Force night fighter observer radar operator and gunner during the Second World War.
- Charles Spackman, British Army officer during World War I, recipient of the Victoria Cross; born in Fulham.
- Jenkin Thompson, captain in the Royal Army Medical Corps during World War II, recipient of the George Cross; born in Fulham.

== Politics and government ==
- Frank Banfield, served on the Fulham Metropolitan Borough Council, Mayor of Fulham in 1952/53. Son of politician William Banfield.
- William Banfield, trade unionist and Labour Party politician. William Banfield House in Munster Road, Fulham, is named after him. He died in Hammersmith. Father of politician Frank Banfield.
- Robert Bellinger, politician and Lord Mayor of London from 1966 to 1967; grew up in Fulham.
- Millicent Browne, suffragette born in Fulham
- Matthew Carrington, Baron Carrington of Fulham
- Gwyneth Dunwoody, Labour Party politician, daughter of Labour Party politicians Norah and Morgan Phillips; born and raised in Fulham.
- Thomas Frewen, Member of Parliament for Rye; lived at Claybrook House in Fulham.
- Robert Mark Gentry, politician and trade unionist, who served as Mayor of Fulham from 1919 to 1921.
- Stephen Greenhalgh, businessman and politician, and was the second Deputy Mayor for Policing and Crime in London. He lives in Fulham.
- Rupa Huq, Labour Party politician, columnist, and academic; Member of Parliament (MP) for Ealing Central and Acton. Born in Hammersmith; sister of television presenter Konnie Huq.
- Morgan Phillips, Labour politician, husband of fellow Labour politician Norah Phillips and father of Labour politician Gwyneth Dunwoody; lived in Fulham.
- Norah Phillips, Baroness Phillips, Labour politician, wife of fellow Labour politician Morgan Phillips and mother of Labour politician Gwyneth Dunwoody; lived in Fulham.
- Jacob Rees-Mogg, Conservative politician, former Secretary of State for Business, Energy and Industrial Strategy; born in Hammersmith.
- Andy Slaughter, Labour Party politician, Member of Parliament (MP) for Hammersmith and Chiswick; born in Hammersmith.
- Thomas Smith, Tudor period judge, lived in Parsons Green.
- George Stone, socialist journalist; born in Fulham
- Ralph Warren, Lord Mayor of London first in 1536 and again in 1543; lived at Fulham House

== Religion ==
- Alfred Blomfield, Bishop of Colchester; born in Fulham. Son of Charles James Blomfield and brother of architect Arthur Blomfield, children's writer Lucy Elizabeth Bather.
- Charles James Blomfield, Bishop of London and father of architect Arthur Blomfield, children's writer Lucy Elizabeth Bather, and Alfred Blomfield, Bishop of Colchester. He lived at Fulham Palace during his tenure as Bishop of London and is buried at All Saints Church, Fulham.
- Geoffrey Fisher, Bishop of London from 1939 to 1945, and Archbishop of Canterbury from 1945 to 1961. Officiated at the wedding of then-Princess Elizabeth and Philip Mountbatten. During his tenure as Bishop of London, he lived at Fulham Palace.
- Arthur Winnington-Ingram, Bishop of London from 1901 to 1939; (from Fulham).

== Sports ==
=== Association football ===
- Herbert Ashford, former professional left half, born in Fulham.
- Nicky Bissett, former professional central defender, born in Fulham.
- Keith Branagan, former professional goalkeeper, born in Fulham.
- Jack Carruthers, former professional Half back and centre forward, born in Fulham.
- Roy Cotton, retired amateur winger, born in Fulham.
- Harry Ford, former professional outside right, born in Fulham.
- Ray Goddard, former professional goalkeeper, born in Fulham.
- Nigel Gray, former professional centre back, born in Fulham.
- Brian Greenaway, former professional winger, born in Fulham.
- Alex Greenwood, former professional full back, born in Fulham.
- Bernard Joy, former amateur centre half and journalist, born in Fulham.
- Pat Kerrins, former professional outside left, born in Fulham.
- Malcolm Macdonald, former professional forward and manager, born in Fulham.
- Simon Milton, former professional midfielder, born in Fulham.
- Len Oliver, former professional right-half, born in Fulham.
- Stuart Pearce, manager and player, born in Hammersmith.
- George Powell, former professional right back, born in Fulham.
- Paul Reaney, former professional right back, born in Fulham.
- Ronald Rowe, former amateur wing half, born in Fulham.
- Peter Springett, former professional goalkeeper, born in Fulham; brother of goalkeeper Ron Springett.
- Ron Springett, former professional goalkeeper, born in Fulham; brother of goalkeeper Peter Springett.
- Peter Southey, played for Tottenham Hotspur, born in Parsons Green.
- Kenny Stroud, former professional midfielder/defender, born in Fulham.
- Jim Swinden, former professional Inside forward, born in Fulham.
- Ernie Symes, former professional left back, born in Fulham.
- Phil White, former professional winger, born in Fulham.

=== Boxing ===
- Joe Calzaghe, Welsh former professional boxer, born in Hammersmith.
- George Groves, former professional boxer, born in Hammersmith.
- Frank Bruno, English former professional boxer, born in Hammersmith.

=== Cricket ===
- Neville Ames, cricketer, born in Fulham.
- Efren Cruz, cricketer, born in Hammersmith.
- George King, New Zealand cricketer, born in Fulham.
- Ian Lomax, cricketer, born in Fulham.
- Tony Pigott, cricketer, born in Fulham.
- Leonard Summers, cricketer, born in Fulham.
- Bob White, cricketer, born in Fulham.

=== Cycling ===
- William Isaacs, cyclist, born in Fulham.
- Thomas Johnson, cyclist, born in Fulham.
- Cyril Peacock, racing cyclist who was world champion in 1954; born in Fulham.

=== Race driving ===
- Johnny Claes, English-born racing driver who competed for Belgium, born in Fulham.
- Stirling Moss, former Formula One racing driver.

=== Water sports ===
- John Budd, water polo player, born in Fulham.
- Simon Gray, international swimmer, born in Fulham.
- Harry Kelley, professional oarsman, born and died in Fulham.
- Alfred Pycock, swimmer, born in Fulham.
- Dick Southwood, rower, born in Fulham.
- Hugh Van Zwanenberg, sprint canoeist, born in Fulham.

=== Other ===
- Sebastian Coe, politician and former track and field athlete, born in Hammersmith
- George Coleman, racewalker, born in Fulham
- Dan Maskell, tennis player, born in Fulham
- Robert Winston, American football coach, born in Fulham
- Georgina Lawton, podcaster born in Hammersmith

== Other ==
- Charles Alexander, Margrave of Brandenburg-Ansbach, owned properties in both Fulham and Hammersmith, where he lived with his second wife, Elizabeth Craven
- Esther Bruce, seamstress whose autobiography was the first book to document the life of a black working-class woman in Britain; born in Fulham
- Eleanor de Freitas, lived in Fulham
- Leslie Fox, awarded the George Cross for rescuing an injured man from a bomb site in 1944; born in Fulham.
- Barry George
- Edith Marguerite Harrington, first wife of journalist Philip Morton Shand and through her son, Bruce, was the paternal grandmother of Camilla, Duchess of Cornwall; born in Fulham and lived in Hammersmith
- John Mordaunt, 1st Viscount Mordaunt, royalist; lived and died in Parsons Green
- Joyce Vincent, born in Hammersmith and raised near Fulham Palace Road
