= Blomfield =

Blomfield is a surname. Notable people with the surname include:

- Alfred Blomfield, English bishop
- Alfred W. Blomfield, English architect who worked for Watney's Brewery
- Arthur Blomfield, English architect
- Charles Blomfield (disambiguation), several people
- David Blomfield, English politician, writer, book editor and local historian
- Derek Blomfield, English actor
- Dorothy Blomfield (later Dorothy Gurney), English poet
- Edward Valentine Blomfield, classical scholar
- Ezekiel Blomfield, English congregational minister
- Francis Blomfield, English cricketer
- George John Blomfield, English clergyman
- Isla Blomfield, Australian nurse and sanitary inspector
- James Blomfield, Canadian artist
- Lofty Blomfield, New Zealand boxer and wrestler
- Paloma Faith Blomfield, English singer
- Paul Blomfield, English politician
- (Lady) Sara Blomfield, English writer
- Reginald Blomfield, English architect
- Thomas Valentine Blomfield, British soldier and New South Wales settler and pastoralist
- William Blomfield, New Zealand cartoonist

== See also ==
- Blomfield Road, a street in London
- Blomefield (surname)
