= Dorothy Gurney =

British hymn-writer and poet (1858–1932)

- Born: Dorothy Frances Blomfield; 4 October 1858; Finsbury Circus, London, England
- Died: 15 June 1932 (aged 73); Notting Hill, London, England
- Occupations: Poet and hymn-writer
- Notable work: "In God's Garden", "O Perfect Love"

Dorothy Frances Blomfield Gurney (née Blomfield; 4 October 1858 – 15 June 1932) was a British hymn-writer and poet.

== Biography ==
Known as Dora, she was the daughter of Frederick George Blomfield, Rector of St Andrew Undershaft in the City of London. She was a granddaughter of Charles James Blomfield, who was Bishop of London from 1828 to 1856; niece to the architect Sir Arthur Blomfield and Alfred Blomfield, Bishop of Colchester from 1882 to 1894; and cousin of the geologist Francis Arthur Bather. She was described by This England magazine as a "shy, devout girl with an inner passion for nature [who] began writing short poems at an early age."

She married the actor Gerald Gurney in 1897; he was the son of Archer Thompson Gurney (1820–1887), a Church of England clergyman and hymnodist. In 1904 her husband was ordained a priest of the Church of England. In 1919 Dorothy and her husband joined the Roman Catholic Church.

== Works ==
Gurney's Poems (London: Country Life, 1913) include "In God's Garden", "Moon Spell (or Dolly)" in 1882; "Shearing Day", "To the Immortals" and "Waggon Bells" in 1883; " Grandpapa's Wooing" in 1885; "Daffodil Time" in 1886; "Love's Service" in 1888; "When the gorse is all in blossom" in 1889; "Down here the lilacs fade" in 1893; and "North Country Songs" with Strang and Hadley in 1894.

With reference to the words of the hymn "O Perfect Love", written in 1883 for the wedding of her sister in the Lake District she quoted her sister as saying "What is the use of a sister who composes poetry if she cannot write new words to a favourite tune? I would like to use the tune at my wedding." Dora picked up a hymn book and said "If no-one will disturb me I will go in to the library and see what I can do". The tune in question was "Strength and Stay", composed in 1875 by John Bacchus Dykes. The words were subsequently set as an anthem, by Joseph Barnby, for the 1889 wedding of Alexander Duff, 1st Duke of Fife and Louise, Princess Royal.
