= Charles Blomfield =

Charles Blomfield may refer to

- Charles Blomfield (artist) (1848–1926), New Zealand artist
- Charles James Blomfield (1786–1857), British bishop
- Charles James Blomfield (Indian Army officer) (1855–1928), British general

== See also ==
- Blomfield
