= Wedding of Princess Anne and Mark Phillips =

1973 British royal wedding

- Date: 14 November 1973; 52 years ago
- Venue: Westminster Abbey
- Location: London, England, United Kingdom
- Participants: Princess Anne (later Anne, Princess Royal); Mark Phillips

The wedding of Princess Anne (later Anne, Princess Royal) and Mark Phillips took place on Wednesday, 14 November 1973 at Westminster Abbey in London. Princess Anne is the only daughter and second child of Queen Elizabeth II and Prince Philip, Duke of Edinburgh, while Mark Phillips is a retired British Army cavalry officer and a skilled horseman and equestrian.

== Engagement ==
Anne first met her future husband Mark Phillips at a party for horse lovers in 1968. Both were competitive equestrians, with Anne winning the BBC Sports Personality of the Year award in 1971 after her victory at that year's European Eventing Championships, and Phillips winning a gold medal at the Olympic Games in 1972. Their engagement was announced on 29 May 1973. Phillips presented Anne with a Garrard engagement ring made from sapphire and diamond.

== The wedding ==
Combined coat of arms of Princess Anne and Mark Phillips

External videos
- Princess Anne's Wedding to Captain Mark Phillips (1973) (external video)

The wedding day, which was on the twenty-fifth birthday of her older brother, Charles, Prince of Wales, was declared a special bank holiday and a global estimated audience of 500 million watched the Westminster Abbey ceremony, with large crowds lining the streets on the wedding day. In the UK, 27.6 million people tuned in to watch the event. Although Phillips was technically a lieutenant in the Army at the time of the marriage, he was also an acting Captain and was styled as such. Princess Anne was accompanied to the ceremony in the Glass State Coach by her father, the Duke of Edinburgh. The Queen, the Queen Mother, the Prince of Wales, and Prince Andrew arrived in the Scottish State Coach. The ceremony featured many ceremonial aspects, including use of the state carriages and roles for the Household Cavalry, Irish Guards, and Coldstream Guards. A tall, iced wedding cake with silver tiers was prepared for the ceremony. Tiers of the cake were formed in the shape of a hexagon, and "a statue of a female jockey leaping a fence" was placed on top of it as a tribute to Anne's career as an equestrian.

The service was a traditional royal wedding conducted by Michael Ramsey, the Archbishop of Canterbury. In keeping with tradition, Anne's wedding ring was crafted from Welsh gold. The tradition of using Welsh gold within the wedding rings of the Royal Family dates back to 1923. Following the service, the couple then returned to Buckingham Palace for the traditional balcony appearance and a wedding lunch. At night, they stayed at White House Lodge in Richmond Park before going on their honeymoon on board the Royal Yacht Britannia, travelling the Atlantic and Pacific Oceans. The wedding ceremony was positively received by the public who gathered in the streets to celebrate the occasion. The BBC gained the rights to broadcast the event.

=== Clothing ===
Anne wore an "embroidered Tudor-style wedding dress, with a high collar and medieval -influenced sleeves". The dress was high-necked and high-waisted. It was designed by Maureen Baker, the chief designer for Susan Small. Anne wore a pair of diamond cluster earrings and her hair was "slightly parted up-do, with beehive volume." The Queen Mary Fringe Tiara secured her veil. Moyses Stevens prepared a bouquet of white roses which was presented at the door of Westminster Abbey.

Phillips wore the full dress uniform of his regiment, the Queen's Dragoon Guards.

=== Best man, bridesmaid and page boy ===
Captain Eric Grounds served as the groom's best man. Princess Anne's bridesmaid was her nine-year-old cousin, Lady Sarah Armstrong-Jones, the daughter of Princess Margaret, while her page boy was her nine-year-old brother, Prince Edward.

== Guests ==
1,500 guests attended the wedding, including:

=== British royal family ===
- The Queen and the Duke of Edinburgh, the bride's parents
  - The Prince of Wales, the bride's brother
  - Prince Andrew, the bride's brother
  - Prince Edward, the bride's brother
- Queen Elizabeth the Queen Mother, the bride's maternal grandmother
  - Princess Margaret, Countess of Snowdon, and the Earl of Snowdon, the bride's maternal aunt and uncle
    - Viscount Linley, the bride's first cousin
    - Lady Sarah Armstrong-Jones, the bride's first cousin
- The Duchess of Gloucester, the bride's maternal great-aunt by marriage
  - Prince and Princess Richard of Gloucester, the bride's first cousin once removed and his wife
- The Duke and Duchess of Kent, the bride's first cousin once removed and his wife
  - Earl of St Andrews, the bride's second cousin
  - Lady Helen Windsor, the bride's second cousin
- Princess Alexandra, The Hon. Mrs Angus Ogilvy and The Hon. Angus Ogilvy, the bride's first cousin once removed and her husband
  - James Ogilvy, the bride's second cousin
  - Marina Ogilvy, the bride's second cousin
- Prince Michael of Kent, the bride's first cousin once removed
- Princess Alice, Countess of Athlone, the bride's first cousin thrice removed (and maternal great-great-aunt by marriage)

=== Mountbatten family ===
- The Dowager Princess of Hohenlohe-Langenburg, the bride's paternal aunt
  - The Prince and Princess of Hohenlohe-Langenburg, the bride's first cousin and his wife
- Princess Margarita and Prince Tomislav of Yugoslavia, the bride's paternal first cousin and third cousin once removed
- The Margrave and Margravine of Baden, the bride's paternal first cousin and his wife
- Prince and Princess Ludwig of Baden, the bride's paternal first cousin and his wife
- Princess Sophie and Prince George William of Hanover, the bride's paternal aunt and uncle
- The Earl Mountbatten of Burma, the bride's paternal great-uncle
  - The Lady and Lord Brabourne, the bride's paternal first cousin once removed and her husband
  - Lady Pamela and David Hicks, the bride's paternal first cousin once removed and her husband

=== Other royal guests ===
- King Constantine II and Queen Anne-Marie of the Hellenes, the bride's second cousin and third cousin
- The Princess of Hesse and by Rhine, widow of the bride's paternal first cousin twice removed
- The Prince and Princess of Monaco, the bride's fifth cousin and his wife
- Princess Beatrix and Prince Claus of the Netherlands, the bride's fifth cousin and her husband (representing the Queen of the Netherlands)
- The Crown Prince and Crown Princess of Norway, the bride's second cousin once removed and his wife (representing the King of Norway)
- The Prince and Princess of Spain, the bride's third cousin once removed and second cousin
- Crown Prince and Crown Princess Alexander of Yugoslavia, the bride's second cousin once removed and his wife

=== Royal Household ===
- The Duke of Northumberland, Lord Steward of the Household
- The Lord Maclean, Lord Chamberlain of the Household
- The Duke of Beaufort, Master of the Horse (also husband of the bride's first cousin twice removed)
- The Duchess of Grafton, Mistress of the Robes
- The Duchess of Abercorn, Mistress of the Robes to Queen Elizabeth the Queen Mother
- Lieutenant Colonel Sir Martin Charteris, Private Secretary to the Queen
- Commander William Willet, Private Secretary to the Duke of Edinburgh
- Mary Dawnay, Lady in Waiting to Princess Anne
- Rowena Brassey, Lady in Waiting to Princess Anne

=== Politicians and diplomats ===
==== British politicians ====
- Edward Heath, Prime Minister of the United Kingdom
- Anthony Barber, Chancellor of the Exchequer
- The Lord Hailsham of Saint Marylebone, Lord Chancellor
- Sir John and Lady Gilmour

==== Governors-general ====
- Roland Michener, Governor General of Canada, and Norah Michener

=== Other notable guests ===
- Brigadier Sir Alexander and Lady Abel Smith
- Richard Attenborough and Sheila Sim
- Richard Meade
