= General Kirkpatrick =

General Kirkpatrick may refer to:

- George Macaulay Kirkpatrick (1866–1950), Canadian-born British Army general
- William Kirkpatrick (British Army officer) (1852–1931), British Army brigadier general
- William Kirkpatrick (East India Company officer) (1754–1812), East India Company major general
