= St Andrew, Stoke Newington =

- Parish Church of St Andrew, Stoke Newington
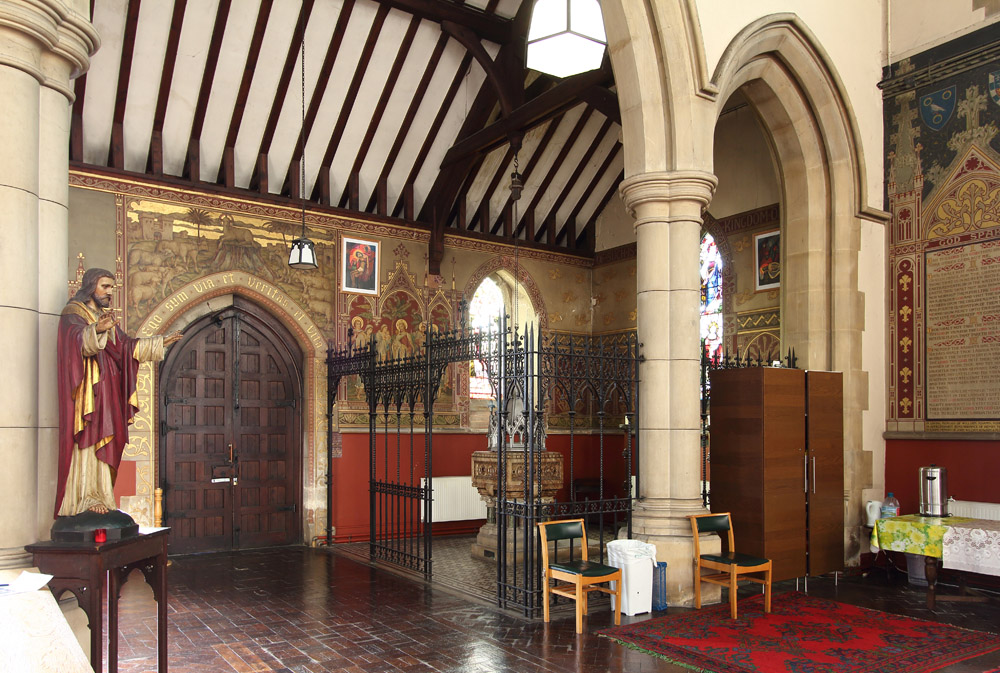
- Baptistery
- St Andrew, Stoke Newington
- 51°34′14″N 0°04′49″W
- Location: 106 Bethune Road, London N16 5DU
- Country: England
- Denomination: Church of England
- Churchmanship: Liberal Catholic
- Website: https://www.standrewsn16.org

History
- Founded: 23 September 1883
- Dedicated: 11 October 1884

Architecture
- Architect: Arthur Blomfield
- Style: Early English-style Kentish ragstone with Bath dressings

Administration
- Diocese: Diocese of London
- Archdeaconry: Hackney
- Deanery: Hackney
- Parish: St Andrew, Stoke Newington

Clergy
- Priest: Charis Enga (Priest-in-Charge)

Listed Building – Grade II*
- Official name: Church of St Andrew
- Designated: 9 December 1988
- Reference no.: 1264896

St Andrew, Stoke Newington, is a Grade II* listed Anglican parish church on Bethune Road in Stamford Hill (on the border of Stoke Newington), in the London Borough of Hackney, England. The church, which is dedicated to St Andrew, is located at the junction of Bethune Road and Dunsmure Road in London.

== History ==
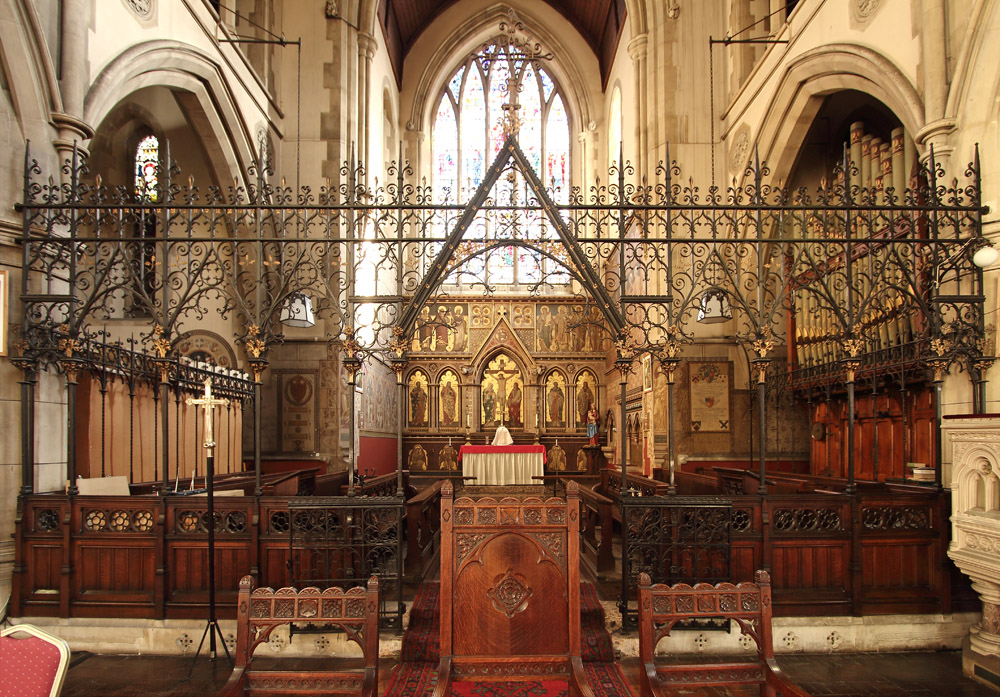
Screen

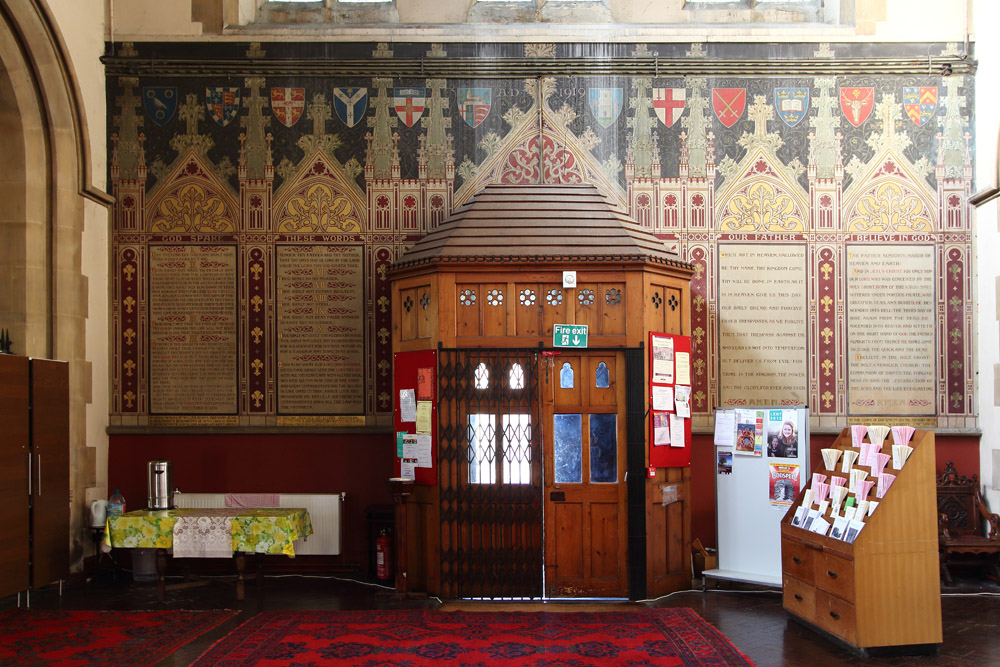
West end

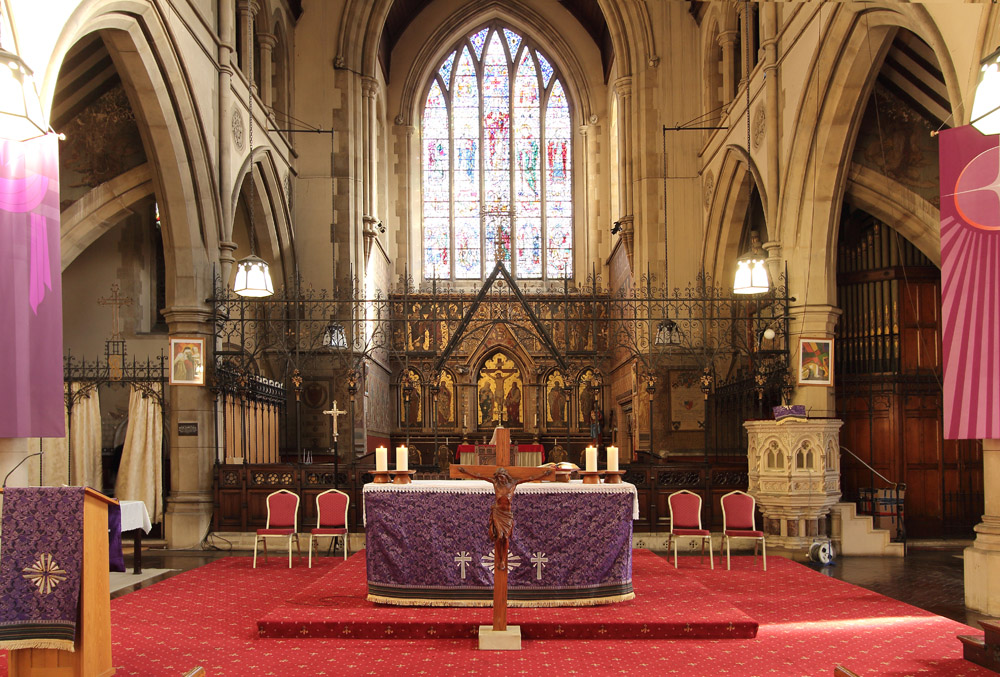
Chancel

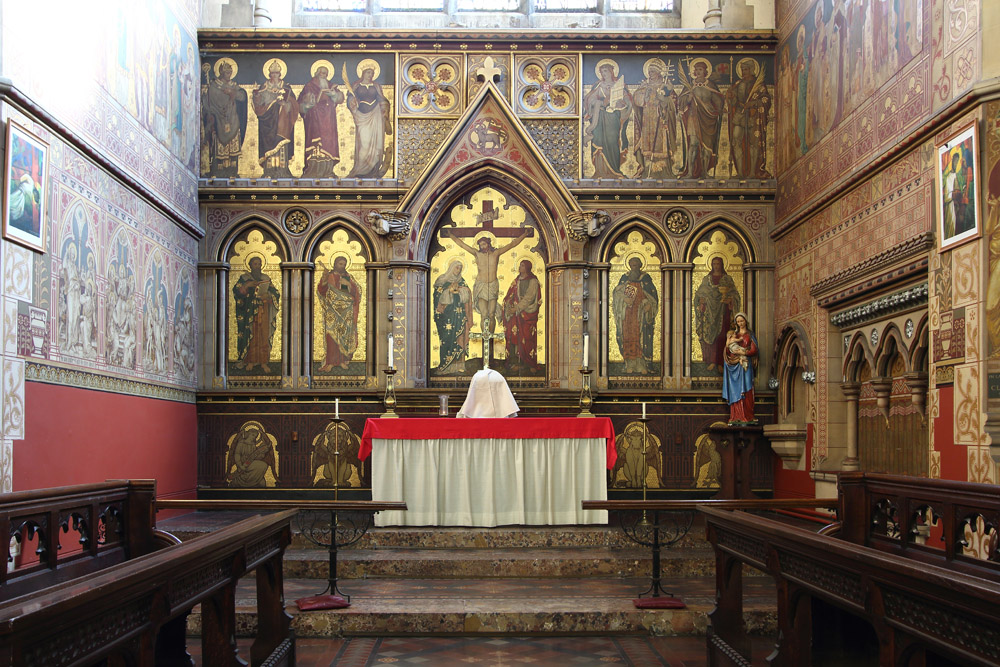
Sanctuary

A temporary iron church was established on Manor Road in 1876. On 23 September 1883 the parish of Stoke Newington, St Andrew was created from parts of the parishes of Saint Mary, Stoke Newington and Saint Thomas, Upper Clapton. It was one of several Hackney parishes listed by Charles Booth on his 1898–99 Poverty Map.

The new parish's church, consecrated on 11 October 1884, was designed by Arthur Blomfield.

Maurice Evans and his brother joined the choir of St. Andrews when they were young boys.

The church's records, from 1883 to 1977, are held at the London Metropolitan Archives.

== Features ==
The interior is particularly striking, and features the extensive use of murals, mostly by the Victorian designers Heaton, Butler and Bayne. Most of the murals have been painted directly onto the walls; only those at high level in the chancel are marouflage. The reredos paintings are on mahogany and portray the Crucifixion and the Apostles. The murals on the walls of the nave depict the life of Jesus from the Annunciation to the Ascension. Figures from the Old Testament and the New Testament are in the chancel above the string course.

Heaton, Butler and Bayne also designed most of the stained glass in the church's windows. The windows on the south side of the church did not survive damage by a bomb on 18 July 1944, during the Second World War. The east window, dating from 1951, is by the Scottish stained glass artist William Wilson.

The great west window was designed by Burlison and Grylls, largely as a First World War memorial, and was dedicated in 1919. It was rededicated on 15 November 2015 by the Bishop of Stepney, the Rt Revd Adrian Newman, at a celebration marking the completion of the first phase of the ongoing repairs to St Andrew's Church.

The church also includes an unusual First World War memorial listing those from the parish who served and returned. It has been restored and is now hung in its original position at the east end of the north aisle.

The font, designed by Blomfield in alabaster, dates from 1884. Blomfield also designed the pulpit.

The organ is by Walker and Sons.

== See also ==
- Stoke Newington (parish)
