= Henry Johnson (bishop) =

Anglican Bishop of Colchester

Henry Johnson

Henry Frank Johnson (17 December 1834 – 7 December 1908) was a bishop in the Church of England from 1895.

He was born 17 December 1834, youngest son of Colonel John Johnson of Walbury, Great Hallingbury. Educated at Eton and Trinity College, Cambridge, from 1856 to 1858 he was a cornet in the Royal Dragoons after which he studied for ordination at Wells Theological College. Following curacies at Richmond, Surrey and Sawbridgeworth, he was the first vicar of High Wych and then rector of Chelmsford. After this he was Archdeacon of Essex, before being appointed Bishop of Colchester in 1895. He remained Bishop of Colchester until his death in 1908. He was buried at High Wych.

In December 1901 he was appointed honorary chaplain to the Essex Imperial Yeomanry.

Church of England titles
Preceded by Alfred Blomfield	Bishop of Colchester; 1895 – 1908	Succeeded by Robert Whitcombe
