= St John the Baptist Church, Eltham =

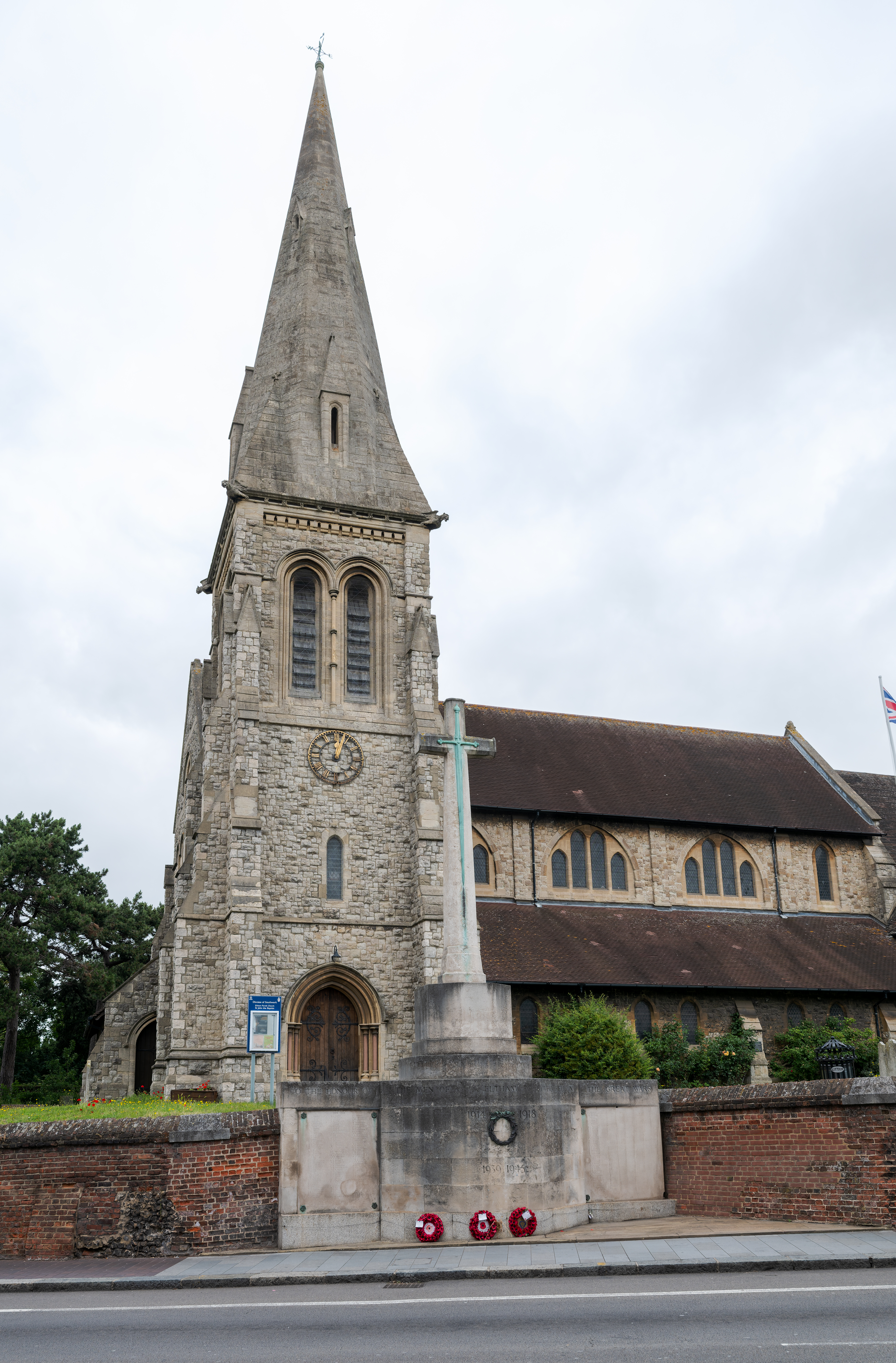
- St John the Baptist Church, Eltham
- 51.4512°N 0.0516°E
- OS grid reference: TQ 42658 74462
- Location: Eltham
- Country: England
- Denomination: Church of England
- Website: www.elthamchurch.org.uk

Architecture
- Architectural type: Gothic Revival Early English
- Years built: 1872-1876 (tower 1879)

Administration
- Province: Canterbury
- Archdiocese: Canterbury
- Diocese: Southwark
- Archdeaconry: Lewisham & Greenwich
- Deanery: Eltham & Mottingham
- Parish: St John the Baptist

Clergy
- Vicar: Caroline Risdon

St John the Baptist Church in Eltham is one of five ancient parish churches in the area now comprising the Royal Borough of Greenwich in London, England. The current 1873–1875 building by Arthur Blomfield (with a tower and spire added in 1879) replaced a medieval and 17th-century one on the site.

Its first known rector was Adam de Bromleigh in 1160 and a document six years later refers to a "Church of St John of Hautham" being given to Keynsham Abbey by William, Earl of Gloucester, who had founded that abbey earlier in 1166. Puritan Vicar William Overton whitewashed its interior walls under the Commonwealth, whilst works to create a vault under one of the aisles caused the nave roof to collapse in 1667 and the whole structure to be rebuilt in 1668.

Its pews were originally in St Mary's Lambeth, being removed when that building was deconsecrated. The church was Grade II listed on 26 March 1954.
