= Frederick Thomas Dalton =

British artist and journalist (1855–1927)

Frederick Thomas Dalton (29 October 1855 – 11 November 1927) was a school master, solicitor, journalist and caricaturist for Vanity Fair (signed "FTD"). He is now remembered primarily for the Vanity Fair caricatures he drew in the 1890s and early 1900s.

== Biography ==
Dalton was educated at Highgate School and Corpus Christi College, Oxford. His grandfather was Charles James Blomfield Bishop of London. He was assistant master of Radley College in 1879–1880. He qualified for admission as a solicitor and in 1893 he joined the staff of The Times, became Assistant Editor of Literature in 1897 and served as Editor of Literature in 1900–1901. He was assistant editor for The Times Literary Supplement from 1902 to 1923.
