= Wedding dresses of Princess Anne of the United Kingdom =

Dresses worn by Princess Anne at her weddings in 1973 and 1992, respectively

Princess Anne, the only daughter of Queen Elizabeth II has been married twice, in 1973 and 1992.

== First wedding ==
The wedding dress worn by Princess Anne for her marriage to Captain Mark Phillips on 14 November 1973 at Westminster Abbey was designed by Maureen Baker, the chief designer for the ready-to-wear label Susan Small; she had previously designed outfits for the princess. The train was embroidered by Lock's Embroiderers. Princess Anne was said to have designed many aspects of the dress herself. It was reported that Princess Anne took inspiration from court dresses worn during the Elizabethan era, and had a much simplistic design compared to prior more extravagant styles worn by other royals.

The dress was an embroidered "Tudor-style" wedding dress with a high collar and "mediaeval" trumpet sleeves, with white silk chiffon under sleeves edged with pearls and other jewels. Her veil was made of silk net embroidered with floral sprays, and her "something borrowed" was the Queen Mary Fringe Tiara.

Compared to previous royal wedding dresses, it was described as "simplistic" and was noted as being close to contemporary 1970s wedding fashions.

== Second wedding ==
For her marriage to Timothy Laurence on 12 December 1992 at Crathie Kirk, Princess Anne wore a white jacket over a high-necked white midi dress.

== See also ==
- List of individual dresses
