= Moyses Stevens =

British florist

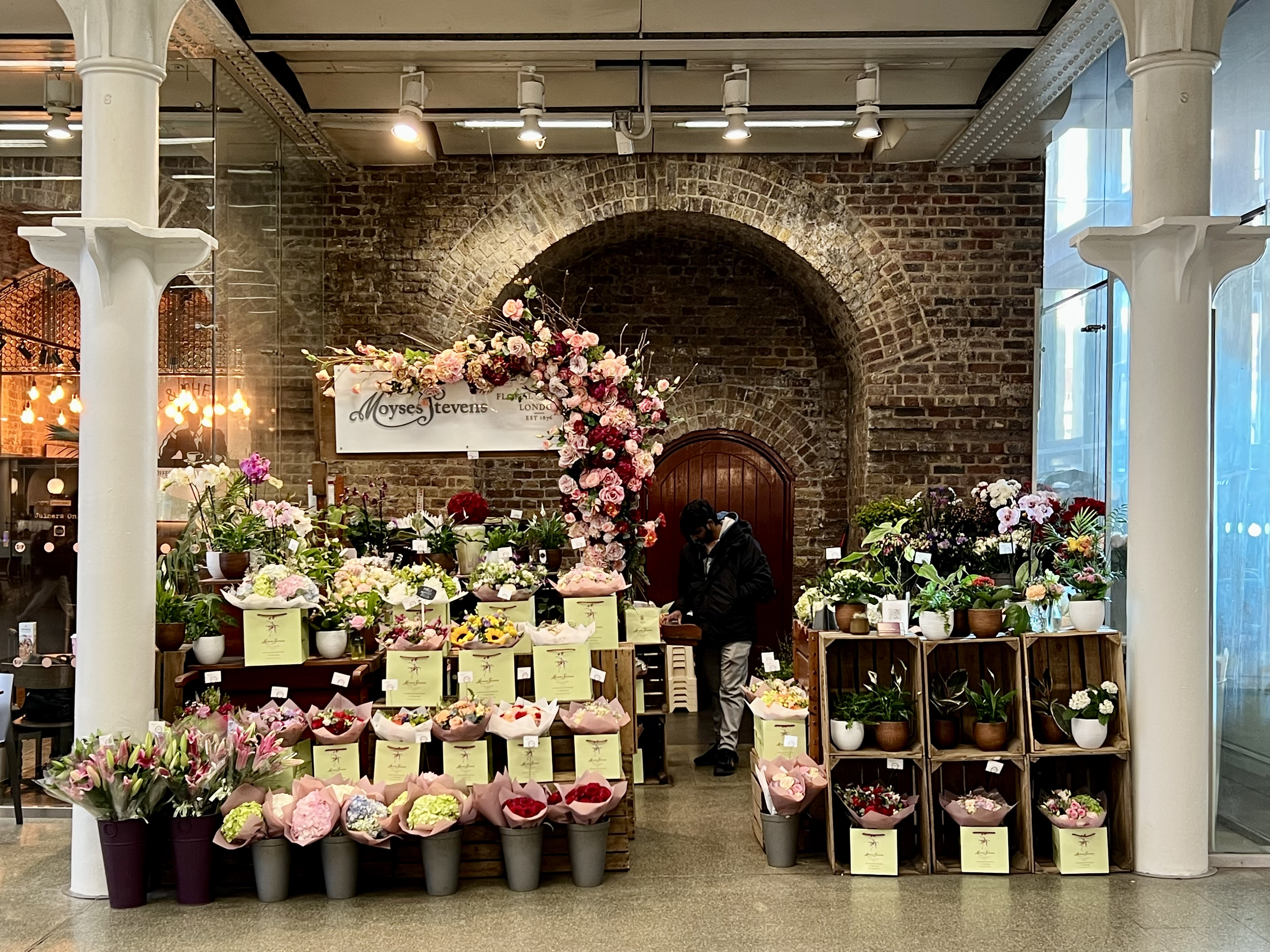
- Shop at St Pancras railway station
- Type: Florist
- Founded: 1876; 150 years ago in London, England
- Founder: Susan Moyses and Harold Stevens
- Headquarters: London, England
- Products: Flowers
- Website: moysesflowers.co.uk moysesflowers.ae moysesflowers.qa

Moyses Stevens is a florist founded in 1876 in London which holds a Royal Warrant to King Charles III.

== History ==
In 1876, Susan Moyses (1849-1929) opened the original flower shop in Victoria Street, London in partnership with her husband Edwin Downer Stevens (1852-1916).

The Victoria Street premises was extended in 1930. In 1936, a branch was opened in Mayfair in Lansdowne House. It closed for the duration of the Second World War but reopened in 1948.

The company was awarded a Royal warrant for Queen Elizabeth the Queen Mother, and later another by Charles, Prince of Wales which they have retained since he became king.

In 1947 the company prepared the bridesmaids’ bouquets for the Wedding of Princess Elizabeth and Philip Mountbatten.

The company arranged the flowers in Buckingham Palace for the State Banquet on 3 June 1953 following the coronation of Queen Elizabeth II.

in 1973 the company prepared a bouquet of white roses which was presented by the chairman to Princess Anne at the door of Westminster Abbey before her wedding.

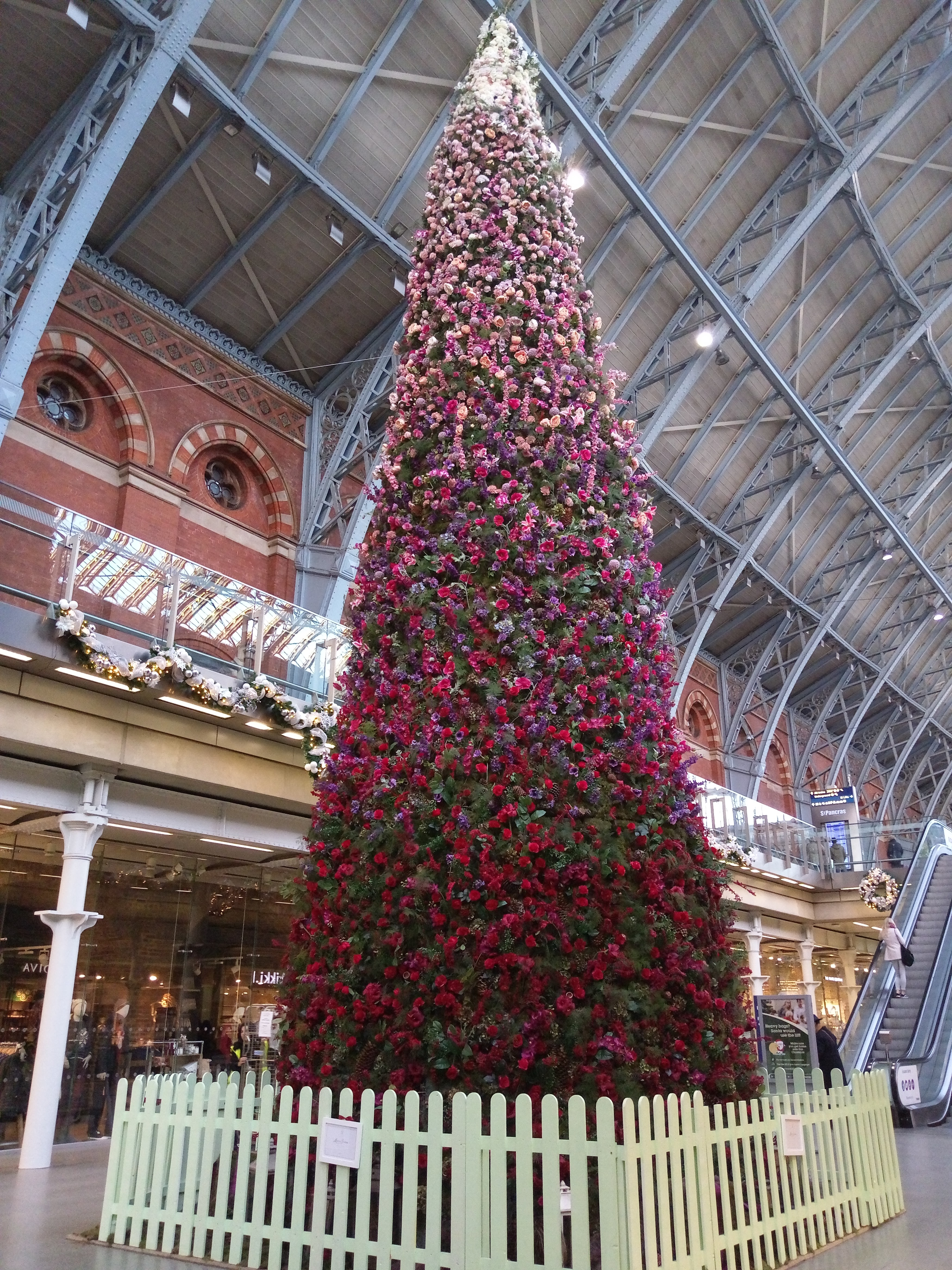
The Christmas Tree at St Pancras railway station in 2017

In 2017, the Christmas Tree at St Pancras railway station was designed by the company. It stood 47 feet (14 m) high and included 15,000 flowers including roses, hydrangeas, anemones, amaryllis, orchids, and dianthus.

In 2018 a new branch was opened on Elizabeth Street in Belgravia.
