= Colin Donald =

British Army general

Major-General Colin Donald CB CBE
- Born: 18 September 1854; Glasgow, Scotland
- Died: 31 October 1939 (aged 85); Kensington, London
- Military career
- Allegiance: United Kingdom
- Branch: British Army
- Rank: Major-General
- Commands: Western Reserve Centre; Wessex Division; Home Counties Division; Hounslow Regimental District; 2nd Battalion Royal Fusiliers
- Conflicts: Second Anglo-Afghan War; Second Boer War; First World War
- Awards: Companion of the Order of the Bath; Commander of the Order of the British Empire

Major-General Colin George Donald, CB, CBE (18 September 1854 – 31 October 1939) was a British Army officer who served as colonel of the Royal Fusiliers from 1922 to 1924.

== Military career ==
Educated at Cheltenham College, Donald was commissioned a lieutenant in the Royal Fusiliers on 21 September 1874. He served in the Second Anglo-Afghan War, was promoted to captain on 30 May 1883 and to major on 3 September 1890.

He was promoted to lieutenant colonel and became commanding officer (CO) of the 2nd Battalion, Royal Fusiliers, on 3 September 1898. The battalion served in the Second Boer War, which began in October 1899, and was present at the Battle of Colenso in December 1899 and the relief of Ladysmith in February 1900 as well as operations in Western Transvaal. Having completed his period in command of the battalion, he was placed on half-pay with promotion to the brevet rank of colonel on 3 September 1902, and left South Africa on the SS Scot the following day, returning to the United Kingdom later the same month. For his service in the war, Donald was appointed a Companion of the Order of the Bath (CB) in the April 1901 South Africa Honours list (the award was dated to 29 November 1900), and he received the actual decoration after his return, from King Edward VII at Buckingham Palace on 24 October 1902.

After his return Donald commanded the Hounslow Regimental District from late November 1902.

He became general officer commanding (GOC) of the Home Counties Division, a Territorial Force (TF) formation, on 1 April 1908, was promoted to major general while serving on half-pay in November 1909, and became GOC of the Wessex Division of the Territorial Force (TF) in February 1911, taking over from Major General Charles Blomfield.

He served in the First World War as Inspector of Territorials in India from 1914 and then as General Officer Commanding Western Reserve Centre from June 1915. He also served as colonel of the Royal Fusiliers.

Military offices
New command	GOC Home Counties Division; 1908–1909	Succeeded by Edward Dickson
Preceded by Charles Blomfield	GOC Wessex Division; 1911–1914	Succeeded by Sir Charles Hull
Honorary titles
Preceded by Sir Geoffrey Barton	Colonel of the Royal Fusiliers; 1922–1924	Succeeded by Sir Reginald Pinney
