= Blomefield (surname) =

Blomefield is a surname. Notable people with the surname include:

- Francis Blomefield (1705–1752), English antiquary
- Leonard Blomefield (1800–1893), English clergyman
- Thomas Blomefield (1744–1822), British Army colonel-commandant

== See also ==
- Blomefield baronets
- Blomfield (surname)
