= Francis Arthur Bather =

British geologist (1863–1934)

Bather in 1918.

Francis Arthur Bather FRS (17 February 1863 – 20 March 1934) was a British palaeontologist, geologist and malacologist. Bather was born in Richmond upon Thames. His mother, Lucy Elizabeth Blomfield, was a daughter of Charles Blomfield, Bishop of London. His father, Arthur Henry Bather, who was deaf, was a clerk in the office of the Accountant-General for the Navy.

Bather joined the Department of Geology at the Natural History Museum in 1887. He became Keeper in succession to Arthur Smith Woodward in 1924, retiring in 1928.

Bather was awarded the Lyell Medal of the Geological Society, of which he also served as president. He was elected a Fellow of the Zoological Society of London (FZS) in 1903. He was an Honorary Member of the Royal Geological Society of Cornwall, and was elected a fellow of the Royal Society in 1909. He was elected a Foreign Honorary Member of the American Academy of Arts and Sciences in 1928. In 1932 Bather was awarded the Mary Clark Thompson Medal from the National Academy of Sciences.

He married Stina Bergöö, daughter of Adolf Bergöö of Stockholm and sister of the Swedish artist Karin Larsson; they had a daughter and two sons. A photographic portrait is in the National Gallery.

== Bibliography ==
- Puns of Shakspeare in Noctes Shaksperianae (1887)
- Crinoidea of Gotland, Stockholm (1893)
- "On Uintacrinus: a Morphological Study". Proceedings of the Zoological Society of London. 1895. (illustrated by Frederick Octavius Pickard-Cambridge): 974–1004. 1895.
- The Genera and Species of Blastoidea (1899)
- The Man as Museum-Curator, Museums Journal, (1902).
- Chapters on Echinoderms in Lankester’s Treatise on Zoology, Encycl. Brit.
- Triassic Echinoderms of Bakony (1909)
- Cystidea from Girvan (1913)
- Studies in Edrioasteroidea (1915)
