= Francis Blomfield =

English cricketer

Personal information
- Born: c. 1827; Millington Hall, Cheshire
- Died: 5 June 1860 (aged 32–33); Cape Mendocino, California, United States
- Source: Cricinfo, 10 April 2017

Francis Blomfield (c. 1827 – 5 June 1860) was an English cricketer. He played one first-class match for Cambridge University Cricket Club in 1848. He drowned after the SS Northina crashed into rocks off the coast of California.

== See also ==
- List of Cambridge University Cricket Club players
