= George John Blomfield =

The Rev. George John Blomfield (9 November 1822 − 24 September 1900) was an Anglican clergyman. A nephew of the Rt. Rev. Charles James Blomfield, Bishop of London, he was the father of Major-General Charles James Blomfield and Sir Reginald Blomfield.

== Early life and education ==
The second son of the Rev. James Blomfield, a schoolteacher in Bury St Edmunds, Suffolk, and later rector of Orsett, Essex, and his wife Anna Maria Smith, Blomfield studied at Exeter College, Oxford, receiving a Bachelor of Arts degree in 1845 and a Master of Arts degree in 1847.

== Career ==
After serving as curate of St Anne's Church, Soho, in London and St Mary's Church in Reading, Berkshire, Blomfield was appointed rector of Bow with Broad Nymet in Devon in 1853.

In 1857 he exchanged parishes with the Rev. Clotworthy Gilmor, vicar of Holy Trinity Church, Dartford, staying in Dartford until 1868, when he was appointed rector of Aldington, Kent. He became rural dean of North Lympne in 1878.

== Personal life ==
On 29 January 1852, Blomfield married his first cousin Isabella, daughter of the Rt. Rev. Charles James Blomfield, Bishop of London. They had ten children:

- Edward George Blomfield (1853−1886)
- Charles James Blomfield (1855−1928), army officer
- Sir Reginald Theodore Blomfield (1856−1942), architect
- Mildred Dorothy Blomfield (1858−1944)
- Evelyn May Blomfield (1861−1941)
- Edith May Blomfield (b+d 1861)
- Maud Isabella Blomfield (b. 1863)
- Margaret Isabella Blomfield (1863−1912)
- Arthur Frank Blomfield (1865−1867)
- Lucy Mirabel Blomfield (1867−1934)

After Isabella's death in 1879, he married Elizabeth Dent Burra the following year. Having retired in 1894, he died in London in 1900, aged 77, and was buried in Aldington.
