= Neville Ames =

English cricketer

Personal information
- Full name: Neville Lawrenson Ames
- Born: 31 July 1891; Fulham, Middlesex, England
- Died: 21 March 1956 (aged 64); Marylebone, London, England
- Batting: Right-handed
- Bowling: Right-arm fast-medium

Career statistics
Competition	First-class
Matches	1
Runs scored	0
Batting average	0.00
100s/50s	–/–
Top score	1
Balls bowled	24
Wickets	0
Bowling average	–
5 wickets in innings	–
10 wickets in match	–
Best bowling	–
Catches/stumpings	–/–
- Source: Cricinfo, 18 February 2019

Neville Lawrenson Ames (31 July 1891 – 21 March 1956) was an English first-class cricketer.

The son of Hugo Ames, he was born at Fulham and was educated at Radley College, where he captained the college cricket team in 1910. He made one appearance in first-class cricket for H. D. G. Leveson Gower's XI against Oxford University at Eastbourne in 1912. Batting twice during the match, he was dismissed without scoring by Neville Fraser in the teams first-innings, while in their second-innings was dismissed for the same score by the same bowler, with the fall of his wicket giving Oxford University victory by an innings and 38 runs. He served in the London Regiment as a lieutenant during the First World War. He relinquished his commission after the war in September 1921.

He died at Marylebone in March 1956.
