= Charles James Blomfield =

British divine and classicist

The Right Reverend and Right Honourable Charles James Blomfield
- Bishop of London
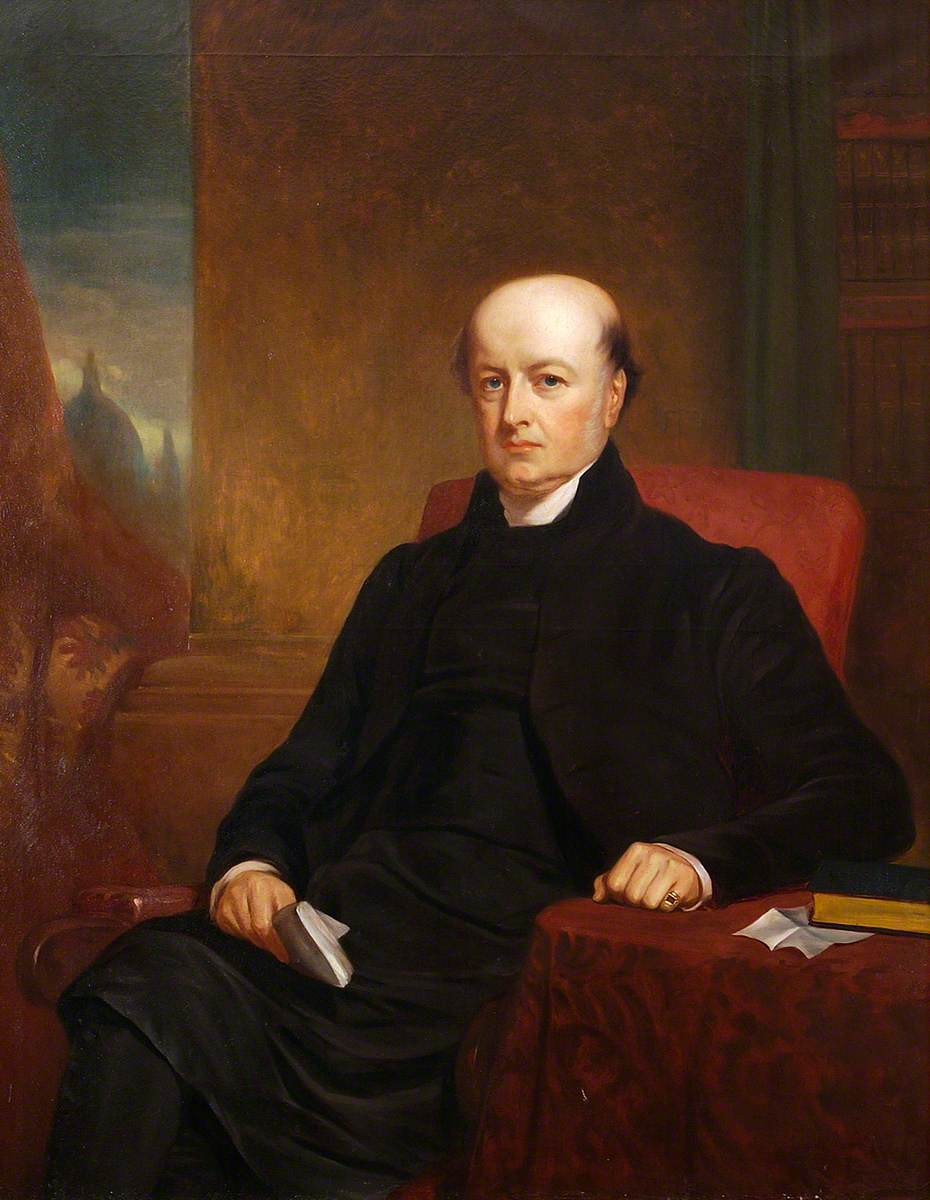
- Church: Church of England
- Diocese: London
- Elected: 1828
- Term ended: 1856 (ill health)
- Predecessor: William Howley
- Successor: Archibald Campbell Tait
- Other posts: Bishop of Chester; 1824–1828

Orders
- Ordination: 1810
- Consecration: c. 1824

Personal details
- Born: 29 May 1786 Bury St Edmunds, Suffolk, Great Britain
- Died: 5 August 1857 (aged 71)
- Buried: All Saints Church, Fulham
- Denomination: Anglican
- Residence: Fulham Palace, London
- Children: 17 (& 1 stepson), including: Arthur Blomfield; Lucy Elizabeth Bather; Alfred Blomfield
- Education: King Edward VI School, Bury St Edmunds; Trinity College, Cambridge

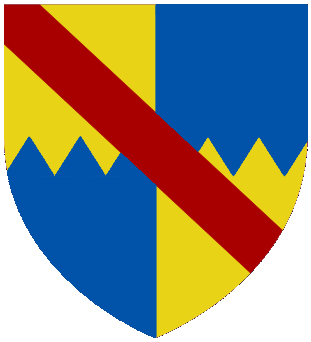
Arms: Quarterly per fess indented Or and Azure a bend Gules

Charles James Blomfield (29 May 1786 – 5 August 1857) was a British divine and classicist, and a Church of England bishop for 32 years.

== Early life and education ==
Charles James Blomfield was born in Bury St Edmunds, Suffolk, the eldest son (and one of ten children) of Charles Blomfield (1763–1831), a schoolmaster (as was Charles James's grandfather, James Blomfield), JP and chief alderman of Bury St Edmunds, and his wife, Hester (1765–1844), daughter of Edward Pawsey, a Bury grocer. He was therefore unusual in becoming a Bishop of London not from an ecclesiastical, aristocratic or landowning background. His brother was Edward Valentine Blomfield, a classical scholar.

He was educated at the grammar school at Bury St Edmunds, declining a scholarship to Eton College after a brief stay there.

Blomfield matriculated at Trinity College, Cambridge in 1804. At Cambridge, he was tutored by John Hudson, mathematician and clergyman. Blomfield won the Browne medals for Latin and Greek odes, and the Craven scholarship. He graduated B.A. (3rd wrangler and 1st Chancellor's medal in classics) in 1808, M.A. in 1811, B.D. in 1818, D.D. (per lit. reg.) in 1820.

== Career ==
Blomfield was elected to a fellowship at Trinity College in 1809. The first-fruits of his scholarship was an edition of the Prometheus of Aeschylus in 1810; this was followed by editions of the Septem contra Thebas, Persae, Choephori, and Agamemnon, of Callimachus, and of the fragments of Sappho, Sophron and Alcaeus.

Blomfield, however, soon ceased to devote himself entirely to scholarship. Ordained deacon in March 1810 and priest in June 1810, he held a curacy at Chesterford, then the following livings:

- Rector of Quarrington, Lincolnshire (1810–20)
- Rector of Dunton, Buckinghamshire (1811–17)
- Rector of Tuddenham, Suffolk (1817–20)
- Vicar and Rector of Little Chesterford, Essex (1817–24)
- Rector of St Botolph-without-Bishopsgate, London (1820–28)

Whilst at Dunton he educated George Spencer (later Ignatius Spencer), and they corresponded for several years after. In 1817 he was appointed private chaplain to William Howley, Bishop of London. In 1819 he was nominated to the rich living of St Botolph-without-Bishopsgate, and in 1822 he became Archdeacon of Colchester. Two years later he was raised to the bishopric as Bishop of Chester where he carried through many much-needed reforms.

In 1828, he was appointed a Privy Counsellor and translated becoming Bishop of London, a post which he held for twenty-eight years making him the third longest-serving post reformation incumbent. He was also the youngest known Bishop of London – his five youngest children were born in Fulham Palace – and his energy and zeal did much to extend the influence of the church.

Blomfield worked with social reformer Lord Shaftesbury to secure more, and better quality housing for the poor. This included the introduction of laws to secure the building of new lodging houses, with regular inspections and measure to include better maintenance of other rented property. He also campaigned against the forced eviction of tens of thousand of working-class people, moved out of their slum homes without compensation to make way for new railway lines, and in particular their termininus stations.

He was one of the best debaters in the House of Lords (members of the Upper House of the Canterbury Convocation confessed to trimming their quill pens before his arrival!), took a leading position in the action for church reform which culminated in the ecclesiastical commission, and did much for the extension of the colonial episcopate; and his genial and kindly nature made him an invaluable mediator in the controversies arising out of the tractarian movement. In 1840 he officiated at the marriage of Queen Victoria and Prince Albert. Between 1833 and 1841 he consecrated four of the Magnificent Seven cemeteries of London. He also made a number of changes at Fulham Palace, including planting a great number of trees which remain today.

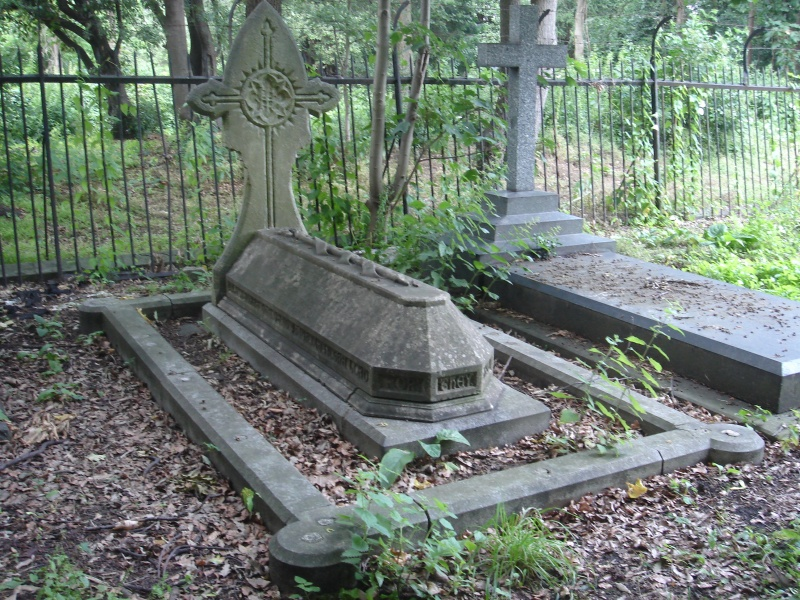
Funerary monument, All Saints, Fulham, London

== Later life ==
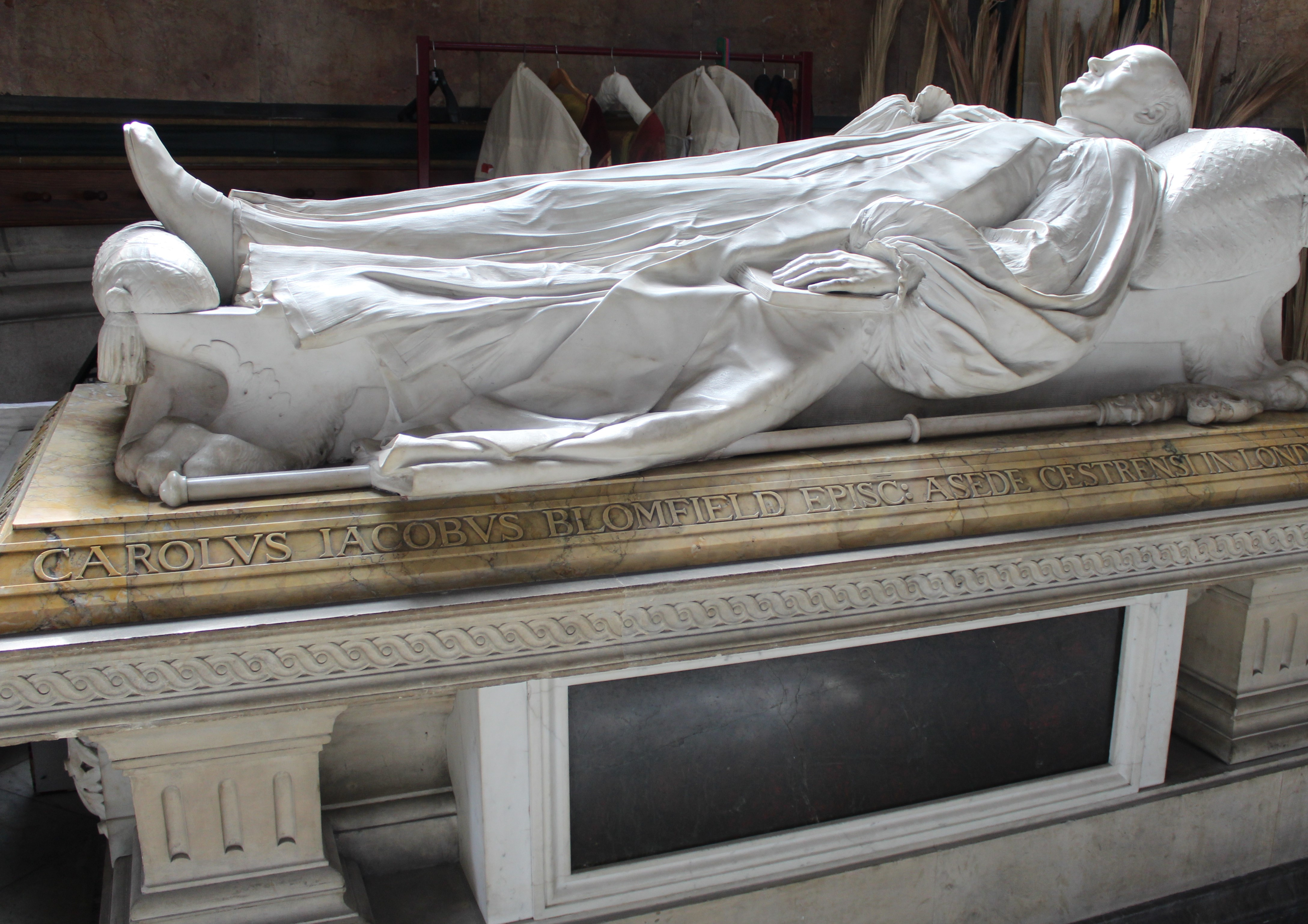
Blomfield's memorial in St Paul's Cathedral

In 1856 he was permitted to resign his bishopric due to ill health, retaining Fulham Palace as his residence, with a pension of £6,000 per annum.

Blomfield is buried in the churchyard of All Saints Church, Fulham, London and a memorial to him, by George Richmond, can be seen at Saint Paul's Cathedral along the south wall of the ambulatory. His grave has long-since had the surrounding railings removed. Blomfield Road in Maida Vale is named after him.

== Published works ==
His published works, beside those above mentioned, consist of charges, sermons, lectures and pamphlets, and a Manual of Private and Family Prayers. He was a frequent contributor to the quarterly reviews, chiefly on classical subjects.

== Personal life ==
Blomfield married Anna Maria Heath on 6 November 1810 at Hemblington, Norfolk and they had six children:

- Anna Maria Blomfield (1811–1812)
- Charles James Blomfield (1813–1813)
- Maria Blomfield (1814–1884)
- Charles William Blomfield (1815–1815)
- Edward Thomas Blomfield (1816–1822)
- Charles James Blomfield (1818–1818)

Anna Maria died on 16 February 1818 aged 33 at Hildersham, Cambridgeshire.

Blomfield then married Dorothy (née Cox, widow of Thomas Kent of Hildersham, Cambridgeshire) on 17 December 1819 at St George, Hanover Square, London, and they had eleven children:

- Charles James Blomfield (1820–1822)
- Mary Frances Blomfield (1821–1869), whose younger daughter Katharine Frances Dalton married George Edward Jelf
- Frederick George "Fred" Blomfield (1823–1879), rector
- Isabella "Isy" Blomfield (1824–1879), who married her cousin George John Blomfield, vicar of Holy Trinity Church, Dartford, and rector of Aldington, Kent
- Henry John Blomfield (1825–1900), Royal Navy
- Francis "Frank" Blomfield (1827–1860), drowned in the SS Northerner steamer disaster off the California coast
- Arthur William Blomfield (1829–1899), architect
- Lucy Elizabeth Blomfield (1830–1864), children's author "Aunt Lucy"
- Charles James Blomfield (1831–1915), emigrated to Canada in 1858
- Alfred Blomfield (1833–1894), bishop of Colchester
- Dorothy Hester "Dora" Blomfield (1836–1886)

Dorothy also had one son from her first marriage, Thomas Fassett Kent (1817–1871), barrister (he was father of the poet Armine Thomas Kent).

The Blomfield household was larger than any other family of a Bishop of London, with eleven surviving children living in the palace. His grandchildren include the army officer Major-General Charles James Blomfield (1855–1928), the architect Sir Reginald Blomfield (1856–1942), the poet and hymn writer Dorothy Gurney (née Blomfield) (1858–1932), the caricaturist Frederick Thomas Dalton (1855–1927) and the palaeontologist, geologist and malacologist Francis Arthur Bather (1863–1934). His great-grandchildren include the civil servant Sir Thomas Wolseley Haig.

== Commemoration ==
Blomfield Street, near Liverpool Street railway station on the eastern edge of the City of London, is named after Charles Blomfield. It was renamed from Broker Row in 1860.

Church of England titles
Preceded by Joseph Jefferson	Archdeacon of Colchester; 1822–1824	Succeeded by William Lyall
Preceded by George Henry Law	Bishop of Chester; 1824–1828	Succeeded by John Bird Sumner
Preceded by William Howley	Bishop of London; 1828–1856	Succeeded by Archibald Campbell Tait
