= Charles James Blomfield (Indian Army officer) =

British Indian army general (1855–1928)

Major-General Charles James Blomfield CB DSO
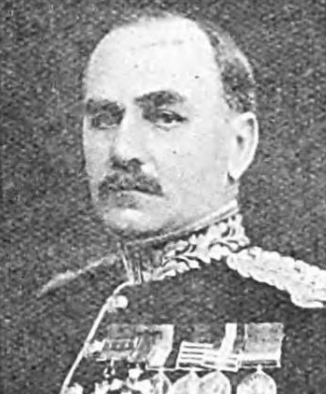
- Born: 26 May 1855; Bow, Devon, England
- Died: 3 March 1928 (aged 72); Frampton on Severn, Gloucestershire, England
- Military career
- Allegiance: United Kingdom
- Branch: British Indian Army
- Rank: Major-General
- Commands: Harrismith and Natal Sub-District; Wessex Division; 1st (Peshawar) Division
- Conflicts: Mahdist War; Second Boer War
- Awards: Companion of the Order of the Bath; Distinguished Service Order

Major-General Charles James Blomfield, CB, DSO (26 May 1855 – 3 March 1928) was a British Indian Army officer.

== Family ==
Blomfield was the son of the Rev. George John Blomfield and Isabella Blomfield, who were first cousins. His maternal grandfather was the Rt. Rev. Charles James Blomfield, Bishop of London, and his brother was the architect Sir Reginald Blomfield.

== Military career ==
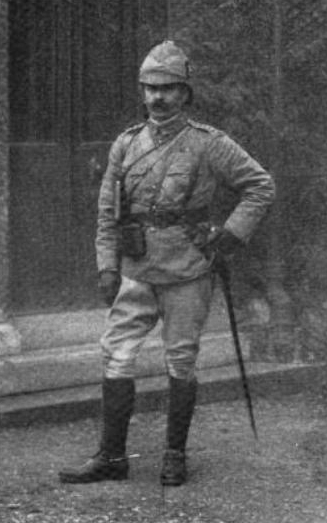
Portrait of Major General Charles James Blomfield.

Educated at Haileybury and the Royal Military College, Sandhurst, Blomfield was commissioned in the 20th Regiment of Foot in 1875.

He was promoted to captain in July 1881, and in January 1884 he was seconded to serve as an adjutant of Auxiliary Forces.

He was promoted to major in July 1890, and became acting military secretary to the commander-in-chief (C-in-C) of the Bombay Army, in 1891, deputy assistant adjutant general (DAAG) in Bombay in October 1892 and assistant adjutant general (AAG) in January 1897.

Blomfield, promoted in October 1898 to lieutenant colonel, saw action in the Sudan Expedition in 1898, for which he was appointed a Companion of the Distinguished Service Order, and then took part in the Relief of Ladysmith in late 1899 during the Second Boer War.

Following the end of the war in June 1902, he was placed on half-pay on October and later became commander of the Harrismith and Natal Sub-District, with the local rank of brigadier general on the staff. He gave up this appointment in June 1906, reverting to his substantive rank of colonel and being placed on half-pay.

He was promoted to major general in February 1907 and was later appointed as general officer commanding (GOC) of the Wessex Division of the Territorial Force (TF), taking over from Brigadier General William Kirkpatrick in January 1909.

In March 1911 he succeeded Lieutenant General Sir James Wolfe-Murray as GOC of a Division in British British India, although the date of his assumption of command was later amended.

He became GOC 1st (Peshawar) Division in October 1912. On 30 June 1914 he was appointed as colonel of his old regiment, the Lancashire Fusiliers.

His last appointment was as General Officer Commanding 66th (2nd East Lancashire) Division in November 1915, a post he held until February 1917.

He was appointed a Companion of the Order of the Bath in 1906.

He died at his home in Frampton on Severn on 3 March 1928.

== Sources ==
- Becke, A.F. (1937). History of the Great War: Order of Battle of Divisions. Vol. Part 2b: The 2nd-line Territorial Force Divisions (57th-69th). HMSO.

Military offices
Preceded by William Kirkpatrick	GOC Wessex Division; 1909–1911	Succeeded by Colin Donald
Preceded by Charles Beckett	GOC 66th (2nd East Lancashire) Division; 1915−1917	Succeeded by Herbert Lawrence
