= Jack Carruthers =

English footballer

Personal information
- Full name: John Walter Carruthers
- Date of birth: 29 November 1901
- Place of birth: Fulham, England
- Date of death: 10 November 1947 (aged 45)
- Place of death: Brighton, England
- Height: 5 ft 8 in (1.73 m)
- Positions: Half back; centre forward

Senior career*
Years	Team	Apps	(Gls)
- Southdown Athletic
1929–1930	Eastbourne	9	(5)
- Brighton Corporation Tramways
1926–1934	Brighton & Hove Albion	23	(9)
1934–193?	Brighton Corporation Tramways		
- * Club domestic league appearances and goals

John Walter Carruthers (29 November 1901 – 10 November 1947) was an English professional footballer who played as a half back or centre forward in the Football League for Brighton & Hove Albion.

== Life and career ==
Carruthers was born in 1901 in Fulham, London, where his father was a greengrocer. After six years in the Army, he settled in Brighton where he worked for Southdown buses and Brighton Corporation Tramways, and played football for their works teams as well as for Eastbourne. He appeared occasionally for Brighton & Hove Albion's reserve team from 1926 onwards, and made three first-team appearances in 1929 before turning professional in 1930. Originally a wing half, he scored eight goals in twelve Third Division South matches as an emergency centre forward in the 1930–31 season. Carruthers left the club in 1934, and served in the Army throughout the Second World War, after which he returned to Brighton and worked as a chromium plater. He died in the town two years later at the age of 45, and is buried at Brighton and Preston Cemetery.
