= William Kirkpatrick (British Army officer) =

British army officer (1852 - 1931)

Brigadier-General William Kirkpatrick CB
- Born: 1852
- Died: 22 November 1931 (aged 78–79)
- Military career
- Allegiance: United Kingdom
- Branch: British Army
- Rank: Brigadier-General
- Commands: 1st Bn York and Lancaster Regiment; Wessex Division
- Awards: Companion of the Order of the Bath

Brigadier-General William Johnston Kirkpatrick CB (1852 – 22 November 1931) was a British Army officer.

== Military career ==
Kirkpatrick was commissioned into the Antrim Artillery on 14 December 1872 and transferred to the York and Lancaster Regiment on 28 February 1874.

He commanded the 1st Battalion of the York and Lancaster Regiment in the Second Boer War and subsequently commanded Volksrust Sub-district.

He became the first general officer commanding (GOC) of the Wessex Division, part of the newly created Territorial Force (TF), on 1 April 1908 before retiring from the army in December.

In retirement he lived at a house known as "Cloon Eavin" at Yateley in Hampshire.

Military offices
New title	GOC Wessex Division; April 1908 – December 1908	Succeeded by Charles Blomfield
