= Alfred Blomfield =

English Anglican bishop (1833–1894)

- Bishop of Colchester
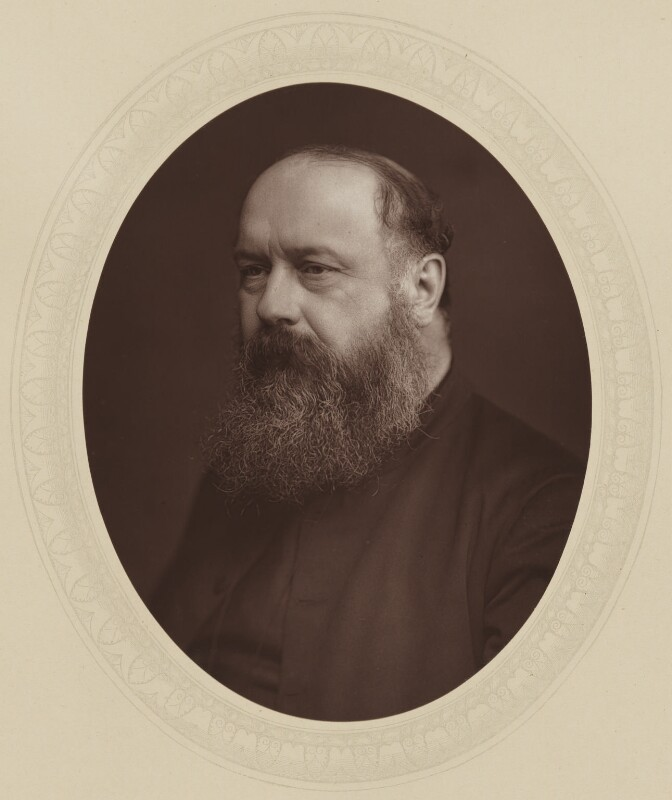
- Diocese: Diocese of St Albans
- In office: 1882–1894
- Successor: Henry Johnson
- Other posts: Archdeacon of Essex (1878–1882); Archdeacon of Colchester (1882–1894)

Orders
- Ordination: 1858 (priest)
- Consecration: 1882 by Archibald Tait

Personal details
- Born: 31 August 1833 Fulham, Middlesex, England
- Died: 5 November 1894 (aged 61) Brentwood, Essex, England
- Denomination: Anglican
- Education: Balliol College, Oxford; All Souls College, Oxford

The Right Reverend Alfred Blomfield D.D. (31 August 1833 – 5 November 1894) was an Anglican bishop in the last decades of the 19th century.

Alfred was the youngest son of Charles James Blomfield, Bishop of London, and brother of architect Arthur Blomfield, children's writer Lucy Elizabeth Bather and Admiral Henry John Blomfield. He was educated at Harrow and Balliol College, Oxford before being awarded a Fellowship at All Souls College, Oxford, where he gained his Bachelor of Arts (BA) in 1855 and his Oxford Master of Arts (MA Oxon) in 1857. From 1857, he was a Curate at Kidderminster, then its Vicar, having been ordained priest in 1858 (and presumably deacon the previous year). At Kidderminster, he initially served under Thomas Legh Claughton as vicar, who he would later work alongside as the first Bishop of St Albans.

After this, he held further incumbencies in St Philip's Stepney (1862–65), St Matthew's City Road (1865–71) in Islington, and Barking (1871-1882, under the patronage of his former college) becoming Archdeacon of Essex in the Diocese of St Albans (1878–1882). From there he moved to become Archdeacon of Colchester in the same diocese in 1882, an office which had previously been held by his father, and at the same time the first Bishop of Colchester (a suffragan bishop then in the Diocese of St Albans) in over 200 years, for twelve years until 1894. He was ordained (consecrated) a bishop (on which day he took up the See of Colchester) by Archibald Tait, Archbishop of Canterbury, on 24 June 1882 at St Albans Cathedral. He died in post, in Brentwood, Essex leaving a widow. His tomb lies in the north transept of St Alban's Cathedral. he had become a Doctor of Divinity honoris causa (DD) by his university days prior to his consecration. He was a Select Preacher at Oxford in 1869.

The National Portrait Gallery holds an 1883 Woodburytype photograph of Blomfield as Bishop of Colchester.

== Writing and publications ==
He wrote a posthumous memoir of his father, in 1863, and a collection of his sermons, titled Sermons in Town and Country, was published in 1871. While vicar at St Matthew's City Road, a paper he delivered in 1868 celebrating the twentieth anniversary of the church's foundation was also published. An opponent of higher criticism, he authored The Old Testament and The New Criticism in 1893 , a work of Biblical criticism refuting the scholarship of Professor Samuel Rolles Driver.

His sermons The Manifestation of the Spirit Given to Profit Withal and Christ the Light of the World were published in 1883 and 1884 respectively.

Blomfield's January 1872 letter to John Jackson, Bishop of London concerning the implications of the case Elphinstone v Purchas (later Hebbert v Purchas) in 1870-71 on ritualism in the Anglican church, was published with the title Episcopal Patronage and Clerical Liberty. In it, he argued that the Bishop had "taken up a position that must gravely embarrass your relations towards the entire body of High Churchmen".

Church of England titles
in abeyance	Bishop of Colchester; 1882–1894	Succeeded by Henry Johnson
