= Holy Trinity Church, Dartford =

Coordinates: 51°26′38″N 0°13′13″E

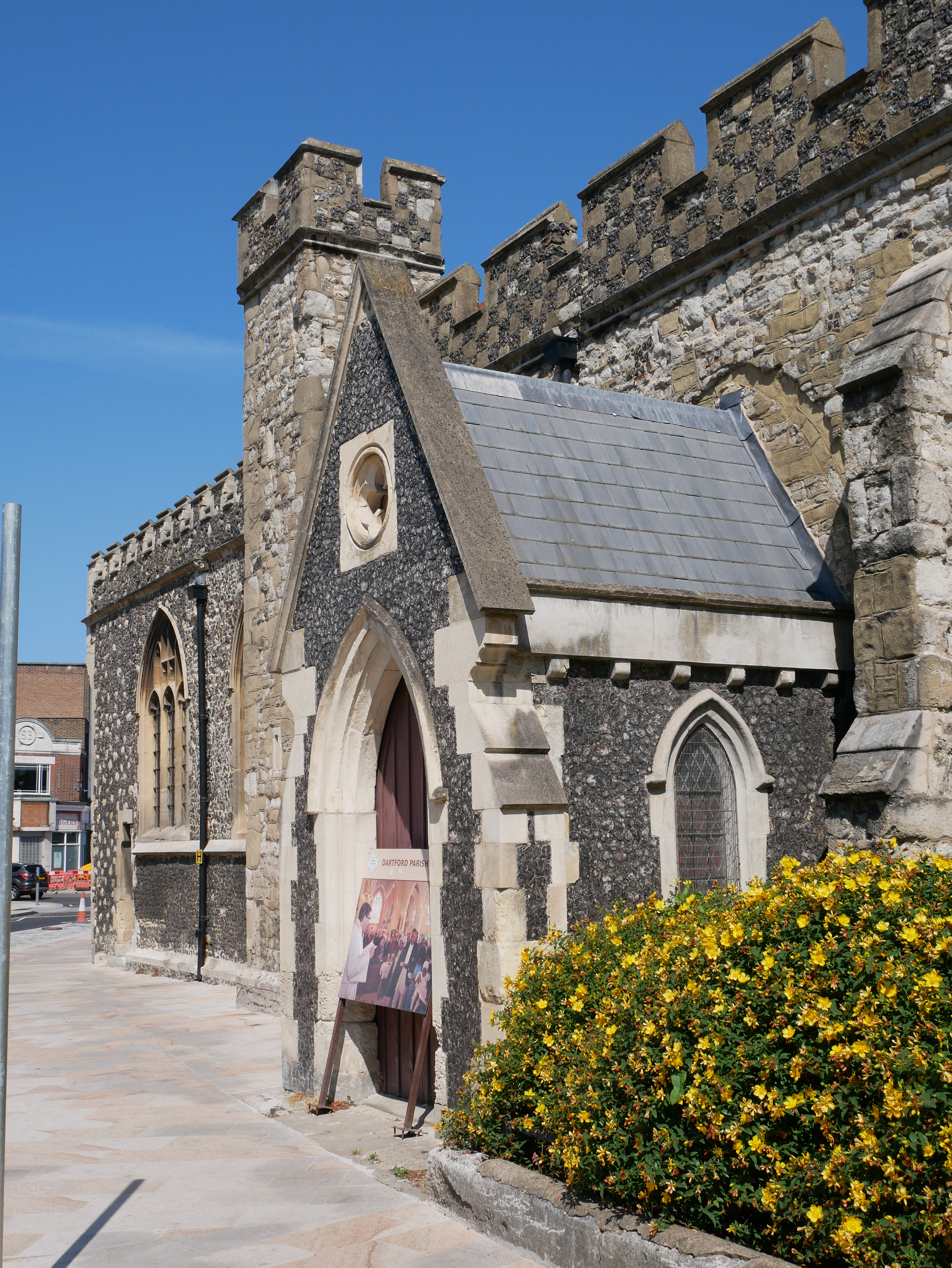
- Holy Trinity Church, Dartford
- OS grid reference: TQ 54404 73996
- Location: Dartford, Kent
- Country: England
- Denomination: Church of England
- Churchmanship: Anglo-Catholic
- Website: Parish website

History
- Status: Active

Architecture
- Functional status: Parish church
- Heritage designation: Grade I listed
- Designated: 22 December 1953
- Architect(s): Robert Mylne, Arthur Blomfield

Administration
- Diocese: Diocese of Rochester
- Parish: Dartford

Clergy
- Vicar: Rev. Martin Henwood

Holy Trinity Church, Dartford, is a parish church affiliated with the Church of England in Dartford, Kent. It is a Grade I listed building dating from the 11th century.

== History ==
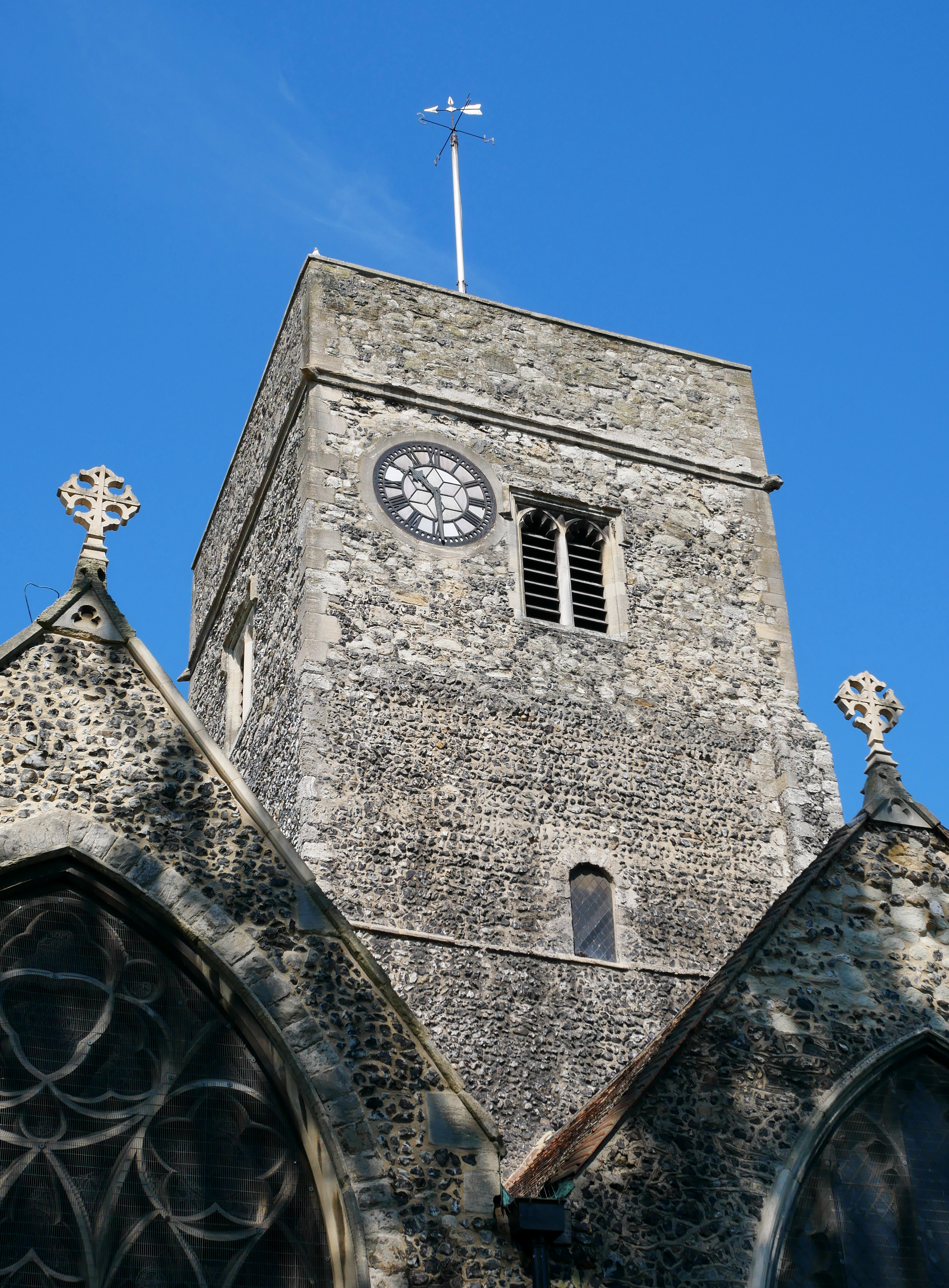
Tower of Holy Trinity Church, Dartford.

Located on Dartford High Street next to the River Darent, the oldest part of the church was constructed in approximately 1080 by Gundulf, Bishop of Rochester, on the site of an earlier Saxon building, and was mentioned in the Domesday Book as containing three chapels. It was enlarged in the 13th century with the addition of a new chapel dedicated to Saint Thomas Becket, for use by pilgrims. When that chapel's altar was removed during the English Reformation and the flow of pilgrims dried up, the church ceased to provide a focus for the town's religious and ceremonial life, and many traders lost a valuable source of income.

In about 1485, a fresco depicting Saint George slaying the dragon was painted on one of the church's walls and can still be seen today.

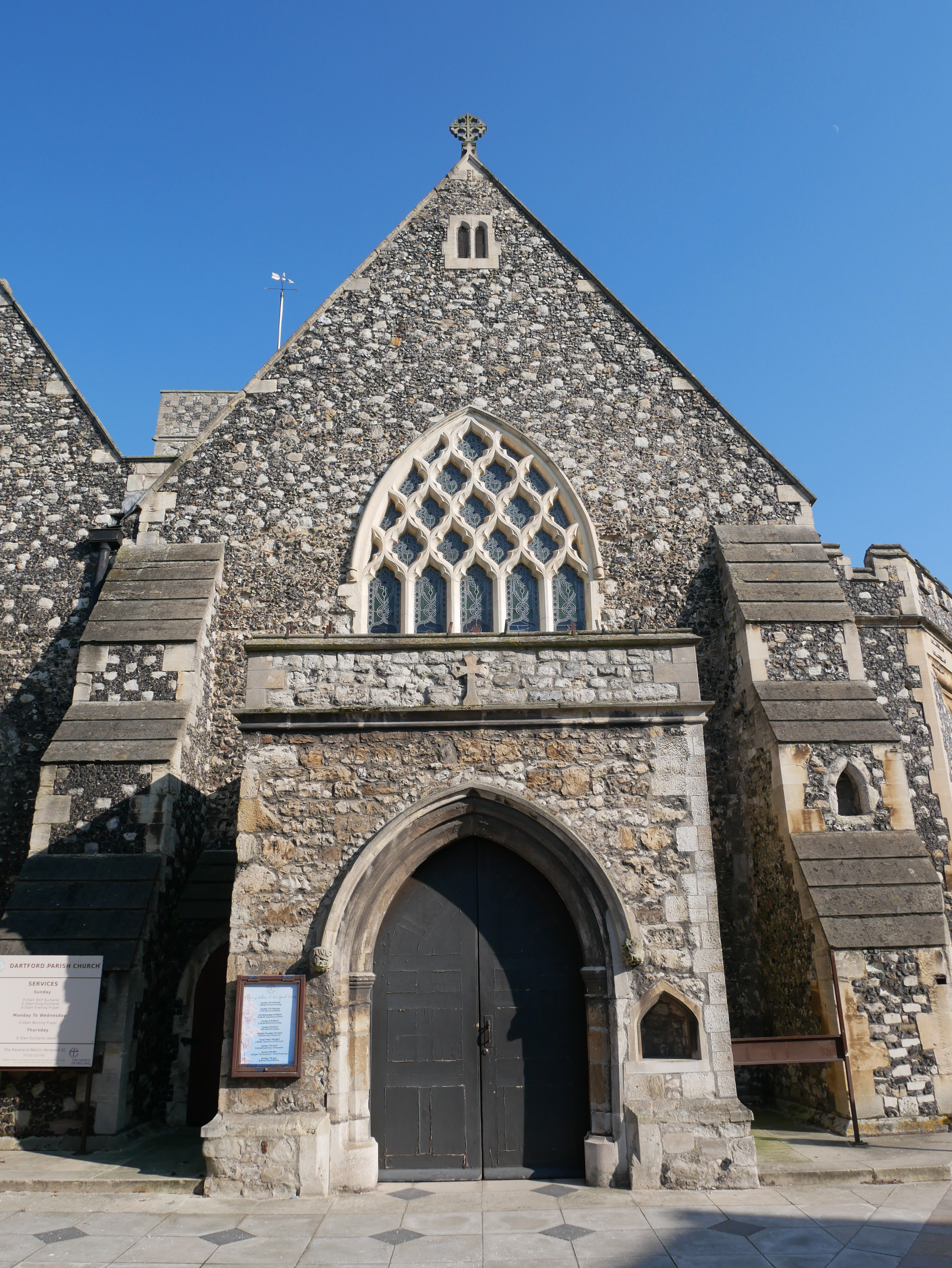
West entrance to Holy Trinity Church, Dartford.

The original Norman tower (currently containing eight bells) was added onto in the 14th century, and part of the church was removed during alterations by Robert Mylne in 1792 in order to widen the High Street. Further restoration work was completed in the 1860s and 1870s by Arthur Blomfield (whose brother-in-law was a vicar of the church) and in 1910 by W. D. Caröe.

The church became a Grade I listed building in 1953. It contains a number of brass and stone monuments, including a tablet by the mason William Stanton in memory of John Twisleton and another in memory of the engineer and inventor Richard Trevithick. Other memorials have been erected for the papermaker and jeweller Sir John Spilman and the topographer John Dunkin. The parents of the musician Mick Jagger were married at Holy Trinity Church in 1940.

A small portion of the original churchyard survives east of the church, a parish hall having been constructed on the northern part in 1971. A new churchyard was created on the site of the chantry chapel of St Edmund the Martyr.

== Present day ==
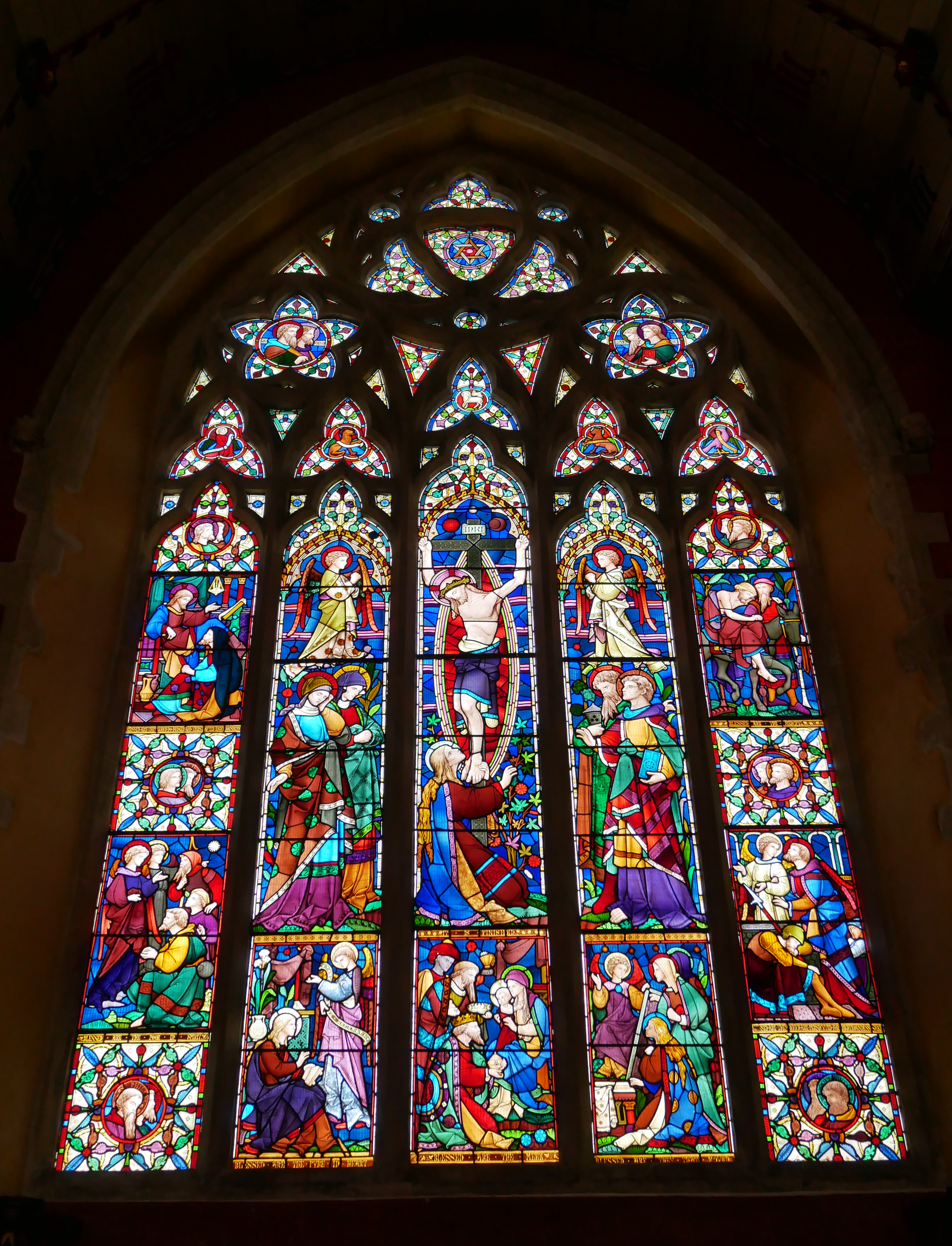
East window, Holy Trinity Church, Dartford.

Rooted in the liberal Anglo-Catholic tradition of the Church of England, Holy Trinity offers weekly services sung by a choir.

Holy Trinity Church of England Primary School is affiliated with the church.

== Vicars of Dartford ==
The list of Vicars can be traced back to the 13th century. The following have served since the time of the Glorious Revolution:

- 1689: Rev. Thomas Price
- 1718: Rev. Charles Chambers
- 1746: Rev. John Lewis
- 1755: Rev. James Harwood
- 1778: Rev. John Currey
- 1825: Rev. Walker King
- 1826: Rev. George Heberden
- 1830: Rev. Edward Murray
- 1844: Rev. Clotworthy Gilmor
- 1856: Rev. George John Blomfield
- 1867: Rev. Henry Bond Bowlby
- 1874: Rev. Frederick Spencer Dale
- 1887: Rev. Alan Hunter Watts
- 1895: Rev. Percy Edward Smith
- 1916: Rev. Leonard Savill
- 1925: Rev. Lemprière Durell Hammond
- 1930: Rev. Elliott Mitchell
- 1961: Rev. Rutland Basil Griffin
- 1984: Rev. Peter Harcourt D'Arcy Lock
- 1993: Rev. Martin John Henwood
