= Maureen Baker (fashion designer) =

British fashion designer

- Born: Evelyn Maureen Porter; 26 May 1920; London, England
- Died: 5 December 2017 (aged 97); Dorking, Surrey, England
- Occupation: Fashion designer
- Known for: Designer of the first wedding dress of Princess Anne
- Title: Chief designer for Susan Small
- Spouse: Roy Baker
- Children: Jon Baker

Evelyn Maureen Baker (born Porter; 26 May 1920 – 5 December 2017) was a British fashion designer. She was the chief designer for the Susan Small label for many years, before working for her own label. She is perhaps best known as the designer of the first wedding dress of Princess Anne.

== Early life ==
She was born Evelyn Maureen Porter on 26 May 1920, one of six children of Stephen Porter, a bookmaker, and his wife, Ethel, grew up in Hammersmith, London, and was educated at a convent school.

== Career ==
Baker rose to prominence when she was appointed in 1943 as head designer at Susan Small, the British ready-to-wear label.

Baker, then the chief designer for the ready-to-wear label Susan Small, created the wedding dress worn by Princess Anne for her marriage to Mark Phillips on 14 November 1973, at Westminster Abbey. Baker had previously designed costumes for Anne.

The dress was an embroidered "Tudor-style" wedding dress with a high collar and "mediaeval sleeves". The train was embroidered by Lock's Embroiderers. Anne was said to have designed many aspects of the dress herself. Compared to previous royal wedding dresses, it was described as "simplistic" and was noted as being close to contemporary 1970s wedding fashions.

In 1978, Baker started her own company, Maureen Baker Designs, following the closure of Susan Small. In 1981, David and Elizabeth Emanuel consulted Baker when designing the wedding dress of Lady Diana Spencer. Baker created about 250 outfits for Princess Anne before she retired in the 1990s. Baker's work is in the collection of the V&A.

== Personal life ==
She was married to Roy, who pre-deceased her. Her son Jon Baker (b. 1960) is a music industry executive, and a fashion designer and promoter. He is the co-owner of Geejam, a luxury resort and recording studio located in San San, near Port Antonio, Jamaica.

== Later life ==
In 2011, 90-year-old Baker was living with her son Jon in Port Antonio, Jamaica. She died at her home in Dorking, Surrey on 5 December 2017 at the age of 97.
