= Susan Small (fashion) =

British ready-to-wear fashion label

Susan Small was a British ready-to-wear fashion label, best known for their party dresses and evening wear. Their colourful printed evening dresses often combined "contrasting elements of exotic prints on simple shapes or traditional fabrics".

Susan Small was founded by Leslie Carr Jones in the early 1940s. In 1943, Maureen Baker joined as head designer, and stayed in that role until the company closed and she started Maureen Baker Designs in 1978.

In 1947, Susan Small joined forces with other fashion design companies including Horrockses and Polly Peck to form the Model House Group, in order to be able to attract more buyers to larger shows. In 1950, their advertising featured the slogan, "To the smaller smart woman ... it's a Susan Small world!" In 1953, Brian Duffy, later to find fame as a photographer and film producer, joined as an assistant designer, having studied dress design at Saint Martin's School of Art.

In 1958, Model House Group became the Fashion House Group in 1958, headed by Carr Jones. In the 1970s they were bought by Courtaulds.
