= Hand & Lock =

- Industry: Fashion; Embroidery
- Founded: 2001; merger of M Hand & Company Ltd and S Lock
- Headquarters: London, England
- Key people: Alastair Macleod (Chairman)
- Services: 020 7580 7488
- Website: handembroidery.com

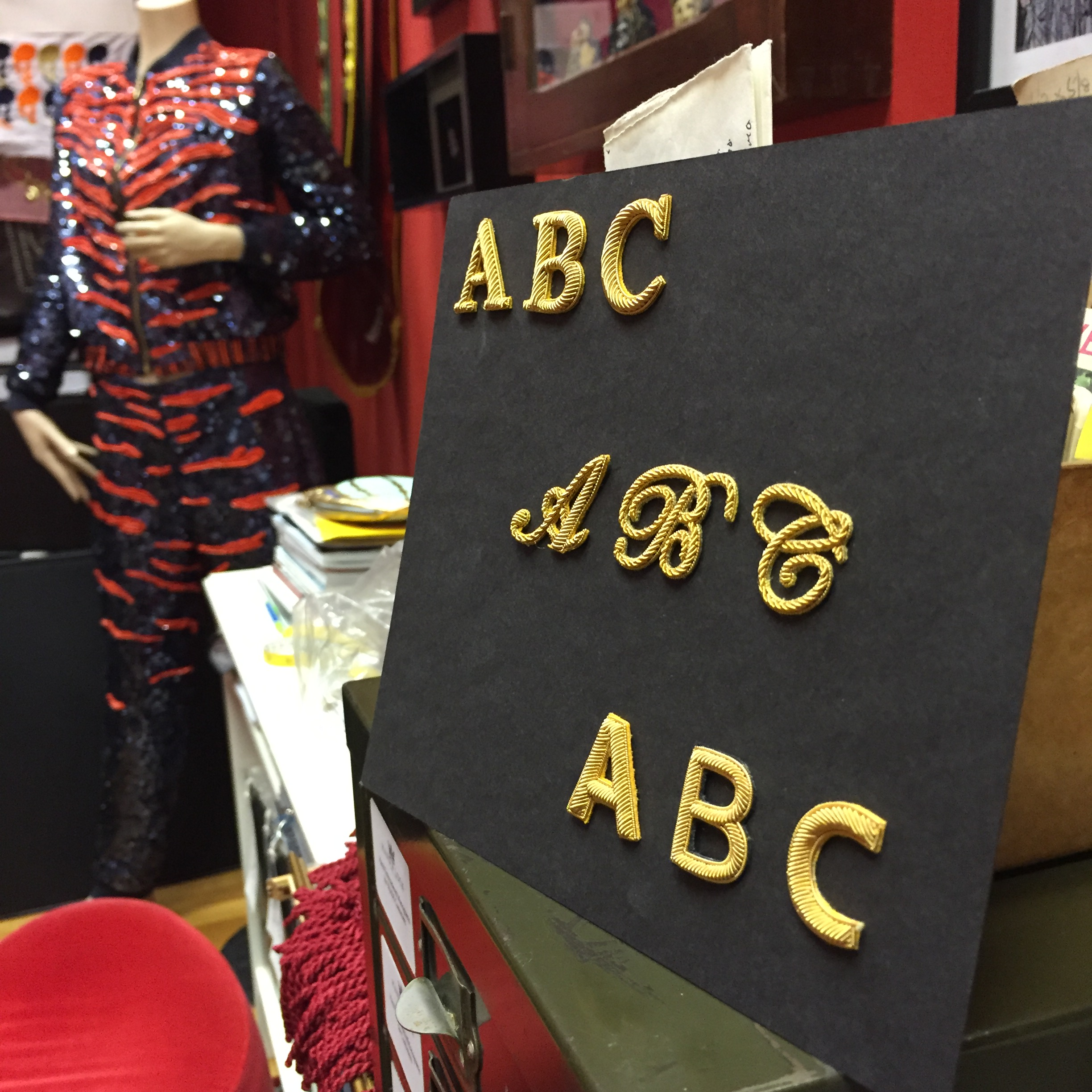
Goldwork embroidery letters on display in the 'beadroom'

Hand & Lock is an embroidery brand in the United Kingdom created from the merger of M Hand & Company and S Lock in 2001, and is based in Fitzrovia, London.

== History ==
M Hand & Company Ltd was founded in London in 1767. Hand was a Huguenot refugee who was skilled in working with gold lace, and had studied under Italian craftsmen. The company produced ceremonial work for the military and royalty, and received a Royal Warrant.

In 1898, C E Phipps & Co. began creating embroidered fashion items and selling them to department stores. Phipps retired in 1956 and sold the company to Stanley Lock. The newly named S Lock Company expanded to create special order embroidery items for fashion houses, including Christian Dior, Norman Hartnell, Hardy Amies and Catherine Walker The company created embroidered gowns for Queen Elizabeth and Diana, Princess of Wales. In 1972 it was awarded a Royal Warrant.

== Company timeline ==
- In 2001 M Hand & Company and S. Lock merged to form the firm Hand & Lock.
- In 2012 they embroidered the banners for the royal barge for Queen Elizabeth's Diamond Jubilee celebrations.
- In 2017 the company celebrated its 250th anniversary.
- In 2019 the company received the Royal Warrant as Embroiderers and Suppliers of Military Accoutrements to HM the Queen.

== Hand & Lock Prize for Embroidery ==
The Hand & Lock Prize for embroidery, originally called the M Hand prize for embroidery, was created in 2000. The competition occurs yearly and has two main categories, each of which has a top prize of $5000. The student category is open to people in part or full-time education, and the open category is open to everyone. In addition, the Wilcom Institutional Prize awards £6000 of embroidery software and training to the university of the winning student. In 2017 for the 250th Anniversary of the company the total prize fund was $42,000.

In 2020, due to the global coronavirus pandemic, the live final was held virtually with a host of events livestreamed online, including a series of talks. Guests included embroidery designer Jenny King, designer and teacher Beatrice Korlekie Newman, and the Artistic Director of the Embroiderer’s Guild, Anthea Godfrey. Winners included Royal School of Needlework Future Tutor Graduate 2020 Martha Blackburn
