= Lucy Elizabeth Bather =

English writer

Lucy Elizabeth Bather (née Blomfield; 31 March 1830 (Note: 1830 birth year is implied by her age as recorded at the censuses of 1841, 1851 and 1861. DNB has 31 March 1836. The Blomfield family bible states 12 April 1830.) – 5 September 1864), known by the pen name Aunt Lucy, was an English writer for children.

== Biography ==
Bather was the fourth daughter, by his second marriage, of Charles Blomfield, Bishop of London. She was born at Fulham, London, on 31 March 1830. Her education, like that of her brothers and sisters, was watched, and to some extent conducted, by their father, and she learned something of the classical languages.

On 29 August 1861 she married Arthur Henry Bather, of Meole Brace, Shropshire, fourth son of John Bather, Esq., recorder of Shrewsbury. She died at The Hall, Meole Brace, near Shrewsbury, after a very short illness, on 5 September 1864. She possessed the happy faculty of interesting the young by apt and attractive instruction, and wrote a number of stories for juvenile readers, and a volume entitled Footprints on the Sands of Time. Biographies for Young People. Dedicated to her Nephews and Nieces, by L. E. B.. The Introduction, addressed to 'My dear Young Friends', is subscribed 'Aunt Lucy', the pseudonym by which the author was best known.

== Selected works ==
- Lucy Elizabeth Bather (1860). Footprints on the sands of time, biographies for young people, by L.E.B. Oxford and London: J.H. & Jas. Parker.
