= Arthur Blomfield =

English architect (1829–1899)

Sir Arthur Blomfield
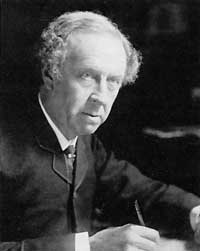
- Born: 6 March 1829; Fulham Palace, London
- Died: 30 October 1899 (aged 70)
- Education: University of Cambridge, Trinity College, Cambridge
- Occupation: Architect
- Spouse(s): Caroline Harriet Smith; Sara Louisa Ryan
- Parent: Charles James Blomfield (father)
- Relatives: Reginald Blomfield (nephew)
- Awards: Royal Gold Medal (1891)
- Buildings: Royal College of Music in London, St Peter in Eastgate, Lincoln, Southwark Cathedral, London St. George's Anglican Cathedral in Georgetown, Guyana Selwyn College, Cambridge Bancroft's School, Woodford Green
- Projects: Southwark Cathedral restoration

Sir Arthur William Blomfield ARA FRIBA (6 March 1829 – 30 October 1899) was an English architect, a keen church builder. He became president of the Architectural Association in 1861; a Fellow of the Royal Institute of British Architects in 1867 and vice-president of the RIBA in 1886. Blomfield became architect to the Bank of England, built the Law Courts branch in 1883, an associate of the Royal Academy in 1888 and he was knighted, and in 1891 he received the gold medal of the RIBA.

== Background ==
He was the fourth son of Charles James Blomfield, Anglican Bishop of London, who began a programme of new church construction in the capital. Born in Fulham Palace, Arthur Blomfield was educated at Rugby and Trinity College, Cambridge, where he studied Architecture He was then articled as an architect to Philip Charles Hardwick, and subsequently obtained a large practice on his own account.

The young Thomas Hardy joined Blomfield's practice as assistant architect in April 1862, and the writer remained friends with Blomfield. He became president of the Architectural Association in 1861; a Fellow of the Royal Institute of British Architects in 1867 (proposed by George Gilbert Scott, H. Brandon and J. P. Seddon); and vice-president of the RIBA in 1886. In 1889, he was knighted. He was awarded the Royal Gold Medal in 1891.

He was twice married. His first wife was Caroline Harriet Smith (1840–1882) and his second wife, Lady Blomfield, was an author and humanitarian. Two of his daughters, Mary Esther and Ellinor Blomfield, were supporters of the suffragette movement and famously made a representation to the King. Two of his sons, Charles James and Arthur Conran Blomfield, were brought up to his own profession, and of which they became distinguished representatives. His nephew, Sir Reginald Blomfield, apprenticed under him, went on to design numerous buildings, public works, and sculpture, including the Cross of Sacrifice or War Cross, for the Commonwealth War Graves Commission. These are in Commonwealth cemeteries in many countries.

He died at the Royal Societies Club in London on 30 October 1899 aged 70 and was buried on 3 November in Broadway, Worcestershire, where he lived at Springfield House.

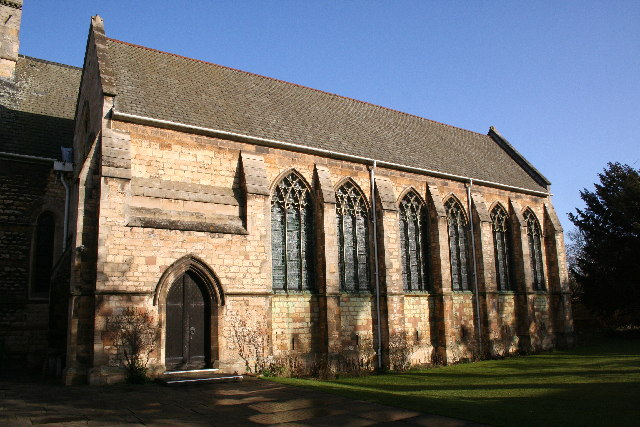
St Peter in Eastgate, Lincoln

== Major works ==
Blomfield designed St Peter's in Eastgate in 1870 as a replacement for a medieval church. The church as it now stands is the combined work of three eminent architects: nave and chancel by Blomfield, south aisle by Temple Moore (1914) and the chancel decoration by George Frederick Bodley (1884).

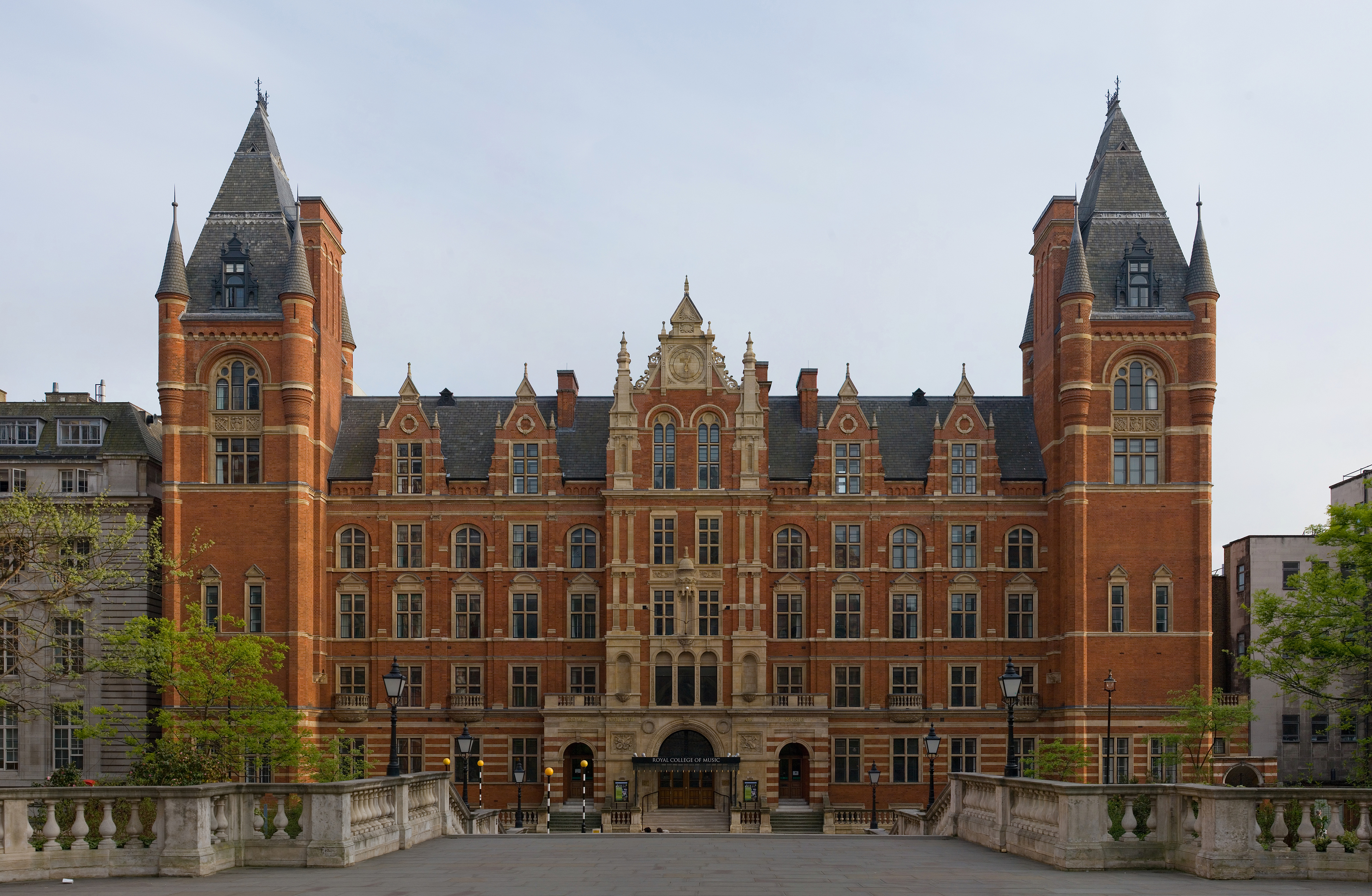
The Royal College of Music in London

In 1882 Blomfield designed the Royal College of Music in London. In 1887 he became architect to the Bank of England and, in association with Arthur Edmund Street, designed the Law Courts branch of the Bank of England in Fleet Street. A. E. Street was the son of the architect G. E. Street.

In 1890–7 he rebuilt the nave of St Saviour's parish church, Southwark (now Southwark Cathedral), replacing an earlier reconstruction of 1839–40. It is a notable example of his use of a Gothic Revival style. He was highly regarded as a restorer; a spokesman for the Society for the Protection of Ancient Buildings said of his 1898 restoration of Salisbury Cathedral spire "conducted in the most conservative way possible ... I am confident that anyone who had been privileged to see the work that is being done ... would not withhold his subscriptions even though he was as ardent an anti-restorer as your obedient servant."

In 1899 he completed St George's Anglican Cathedral in Georgetown, Guyana, which was the tallest wooden church in the world until 2003 when the Peri Monastery near Săpânţa in northern Romania was completed.

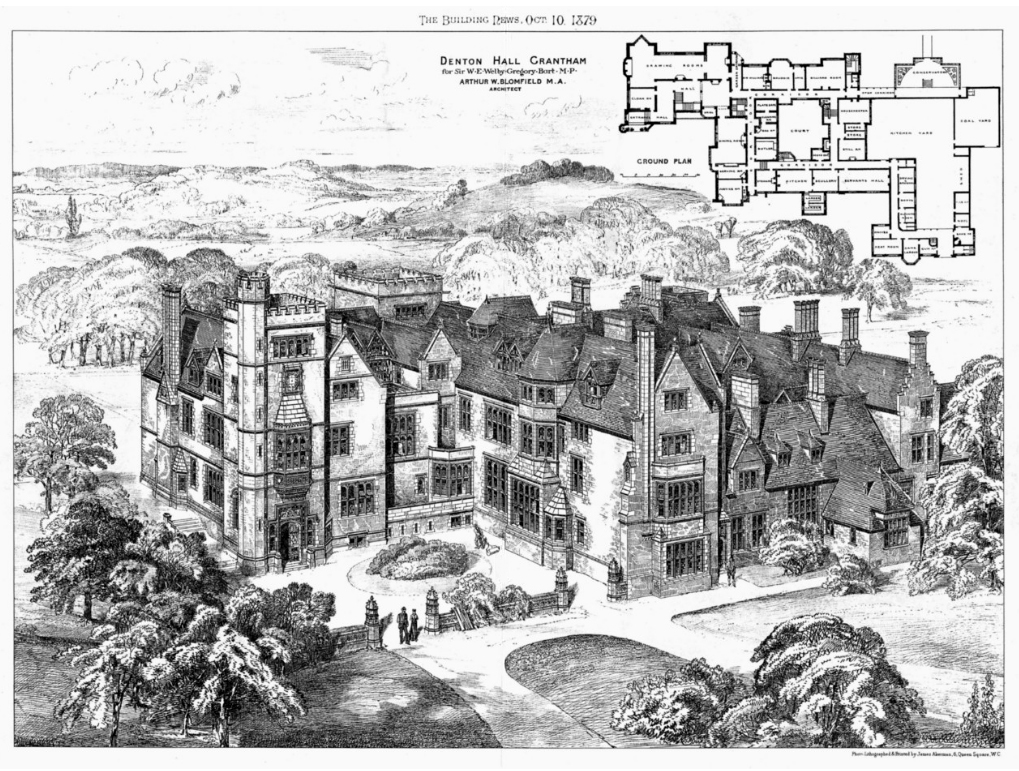
Denton Hall, 1879–1883

== Other works (in chronological order) ==
- St Leonard's Church, Linley, Shropshire, restoration, 1858
- Christ Church, Crouch End 1862
- Holy Trinity Church, Dartford, 1862–63 and 1877
- Christ Church, East Sheen 1863
- St Mary's parish church, Jackfield, Shropshire, 1863
- All Saints' parish church, Windsor, Berkshire, 1862–64
- St Luke's chapel at the former Radcliffe Infirmary, Oxford, 1864
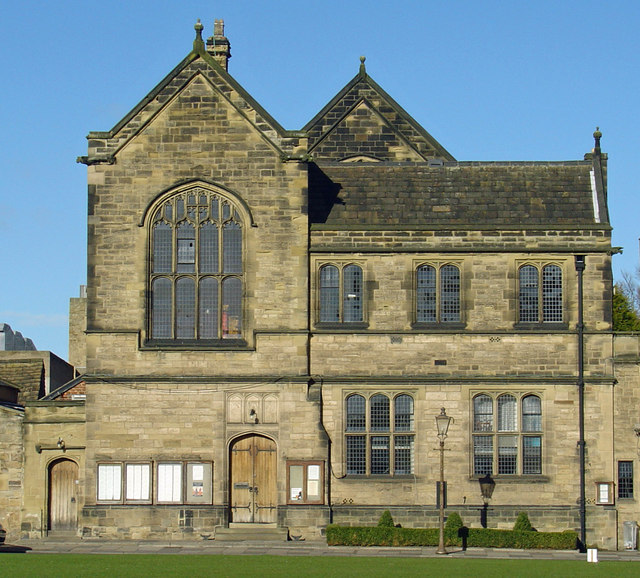
  University Library building on Palace Green, Durham
- St Mary's Church, Banbury, Oxfordshire: restoration 1864
- Dartford Grammar School, Kent, 1864.
- St. Mary's parish church, Adwell, Oxfordshire, 1865
- St Mark's parish church, Binfield, Berkshire, 1866
- St Mary's parish church, Princes Risborough, Buckinghamshire, 1867–68
- St John the Baptist parish church, Eton Wick, Buckinghamshire, 1867–69
- All Saints' parish church, Upper Caldecote, Bedfordshire, 1868
- St. Mary's Church, Strood, Kent, 1868
- The Halsteads, East Sheen, London, 1868
- Vicarage House for Holy Trinity Church, Headington Quarry, Oxfordshire, 1868
- St Saviour's parish church, Eddington, Berkshire, 1868
- St Mary Magdalen Church, Sheet, Hampshire, 1868–69
- St John's Church, St. Moritz, 1868–75
- St. Barnabas parish church, Jericho, Oxford, 1869
- St Peter in Eastgate, Lincoln 1870
- St Stephen's Church, Tunbridge Wells, Kent, 1870 (demolished in 1889 and replaced by St. Barnabas' Church on the same site)
- All Saints' parish church, Neenton, Shropshire, 1870–71
- St Saviour's Church, Oxford Street, London 1870–73
- St John the Baptist, Bathwick, Bath, 1871
- Whitgift School, Croydon, 1871
- St Mary-at-the-Walls, Colchester, 1872
- St Nicholas' Church, Chawton 1872–73
- St James' parish church, Ramsden, Oxfordshire, 1872
- Church of St Mary and St Ethelbert, Luckington, Wiltshire, 1872
- St. Andrew's parish church, Surbiton, Surrey 1872
- St John the Baptist parish church, Crowthorne, Berkshire, 1873
- Holy Innocents parish church, High Beach, Essex, 1873
- Tyntesfield chapel, Wraxall, Somerset, 1873
- Christ Church, St Leonards-on-Sea, East Sussex, 1873-75
- St Peter's Church, Netherseal, Derbyshire 1874
- St Michael and All Angels Church, Hughenden, Buckinghamshire, 1874–90
- Grove Gardens Chapel, Richmond, Surrey, c.1875
- St John the Baptist's Church, Eltham, Kent, 1875
- St Michael and All Angels Church, Maidstone, Kent, 1876
- Chapel Royal, Brighton, internal structural repairs and reordering 1876; new exterior 1896
- Christ Church, Epsom, Surrey, 1876
- Holy Innocents, Hornsey, London N8, 1876–77
- Holy Trinity Church, Privett, 1876–78
- Haileybury and Imperial Service College Chapel, 1877
- St Andrew's Church, Collingbourne Ducis, Wiltshire: restoration, 1877
- All Saints' parish church, Roffey, West Sussex, 1878
- St. Mary Magdalene parish church, Woodstock, Oxfordshire: restoration, 1878
- Trinity College, Cambridge Bishop's Hostel additions 1878
- St Paul's Church, Clapham: East end extension, 1879
- Denton Hall, Denton, Lincolnshire, rebuilt 1879–1883 (demolished 1938)
- All Saints Church, Fulham, 1880–81
- St Nicholas' parish church, Heythrop, Oxfordshire, 1880
- St John the Evangelist's Church, St Leonards-on-Sea, East Sussex (1881; partly destroyed by bombing in 1943 and rebuilt by Harry Stuart Goodhart-Rendel)
- Lecture rooms, Durham University (now part of Palace Green Library), 1882
- St Thomas' Church of England, Shepherd's Bush (now St Nicholas Greek Orthodox Church), 1882
- Selwyn College, Cambridge, 1882-89
- Chester Cathedral restoration and additions, 1882
- St Andrew's Church, Worthing, West Sussex (1882)
- St Luke's Church, Queen's Park, Brighton, Sussex, 1882–85
- St Stephen's Church, North Mundham, West Sussex: addition of chancel and re-ordering of interior, 1883
- St Andrew, Stoke Newington, 1883–4
- Charterhouse School, the Great Hall 1884
- St Leodegar's Church, Hunston, Sussex, 1885
- St. Wystan's Church, Repton restoration 1885–1886
- Wellington College, Berkshire: chapel apse and dormitories, 1886
- St. Alban's Anglican Church, Copenhagen, Denmark
- St Germanus' Church, Faulkbourne, Essex, 1886
- St Andrew's Church, Leytonstone, Essex 1886–93.
- Royal Memorial Church of St George, Cannes, 1886–92
- St Mary's Church, Walmer, Kent, 1887
- St James' Church, West Hampstead, 1887-88
- Minster Church of St Denys, Warminster, Wiltshire: rebuilding 1887–89
- Holy Trinity Church, Gosport, Hampshire, restoration and campanile, 1887-89
- St David's Church Bangor, Gwynedd, 1888
- St Mary's Church, Rostherne, Cheshire, 1888
- All Saints' Church, Leatherhead, Surrey, 1888
- St Mark's Church, Regent's Park, 1888-9 (alterations)
- St Mary's parish church, Rickmansworth, 1888–90
- St Mark's parish church, Bourne End, Buckinghamshire, 1889
- Bancroft's School, Woodford Green, Essex, 1889
- St Stephen's Church, Brighton, additions 1889
- Eton College, Berkshire: Lower Chapel and Queen's Schools, 1889–91
- All Souls Church, Hastings, Sussex, 1890
- All Saints' Blackheath, additions in 1890 (vestries) and 1899 (porch)
- St Cyprian's Church, Brockley, London, 1890
- St James' Church, West End, Hampshire 1890
- Christ Church Cathedral (Falkland Islands), 1890–1892
- Oxford House, Bethnal Green, London, 1891
- St Mary's parish church, Liss, Hampshire 1892
- Magdalen College School, Oxford, 1893–94
- West Sussex County Asylum, Chichester, West Sussex, 1894–97
- The Catholic Church of Our Lady and St Edward the Confessor, Lyndhurst, Hants, 1894–96
- Epsom College Chapel, Surrey 1895
- St Werburgh's Church, Derby, new church added, 1895
- St Mary's Church, Swansea, Glamorgan, 1896
- St Michael's Church, Macclesfield, Cheshire, new nave and aisles, 1898–1901
- All Saints Church, Leamington Spa, two western bays to the nave and a south western bell tower, 1898–1902
- Wellington College, Berkshire, chapel aisles, 1899
- St Saviour's Church of Ireland parish church, Coolgreaney Road, Arklow, County Wicklow, 1899
- Glenesk Mausoleum, East Finchley Cemetery, Barnet, 1899

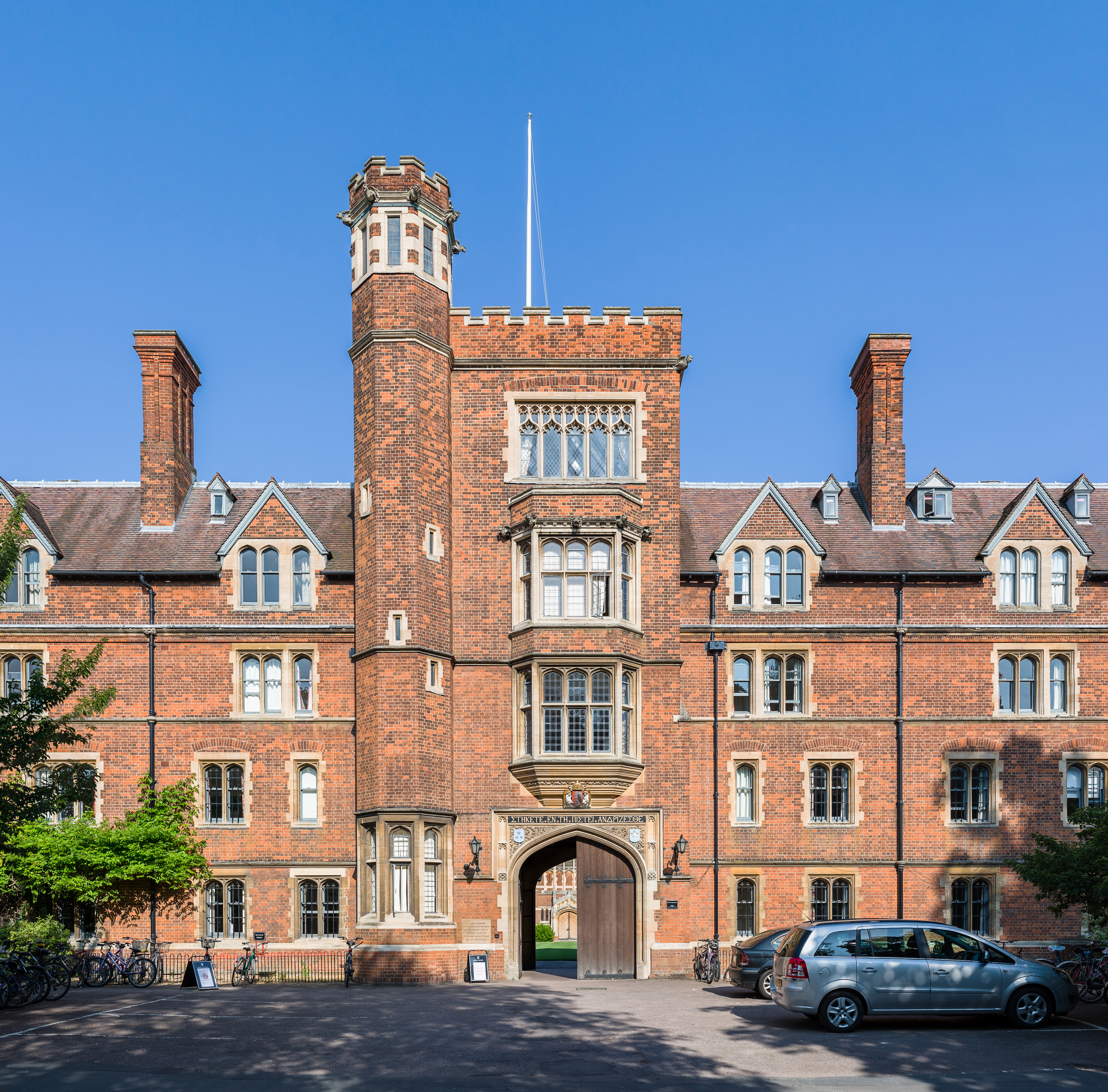
Selwyn College, Cambridge

=== As Sir A.W. Blomfield and Sons ===
- St John the Evangelist's Church, Preston Village, Brighton, Sussex, 1901
- St George's Church, Ashtead, Surrey, 1905
- St Saviour's Church, Raynes Park, Surrey, 1905
- St Michael's parish church, Abbey Wood, Kent, 1907
- Sea Marge Hotel in Overstrand, Norfolk, private residence for Sir Edgar Speyer, 1908
- Church of Holy Trinity, Eltham, London, 1908
- St Mellitus's Church, Hanwell 1909

== Sources ==
- Homan, Roger (1984). The Victorian Churches of Kent. Chichester: Phillimore & Co. Ltd. ISBN 0-85033-466-7.
- Pevsner, Nikolaus (1966). The Buildings of England: Berkshire. Harmondsworth: Penguin Books.
- Pevsner, Nikolaus (1960). The Buildings of England: Buckinghamshire. Harmondsworth: Penguin Books.
- Pevsner, Nikolaus; Lloyd, David (1967). The Buildings of England: Hampshire and the Isle of Wight. Harmondsworth: Penguin Books.
- Pevsner, Nikolaus; Hubbard, Edward (1971). The Buildings of England: Cheshire. Harmondsworth: Penguin Books.
- Sherwood, Jennifer; Pevsner, Nikolaus (1974). The Buildings of England: Oxfordshire. Harmondsworth: Penguin Books. ISBN 0-14-071045-0.
- Pevsner, Nikolaus; Cherry, Bridget (revision) (1975) [1963]. The Buildings of England: Wiltshire (2nd ed.). Harmondsworth: Penguin Books. ISBN 0-14-0710-26-4.
