= Brandhoek =

Coordinates: 50°51′16″N 02°47′23″E

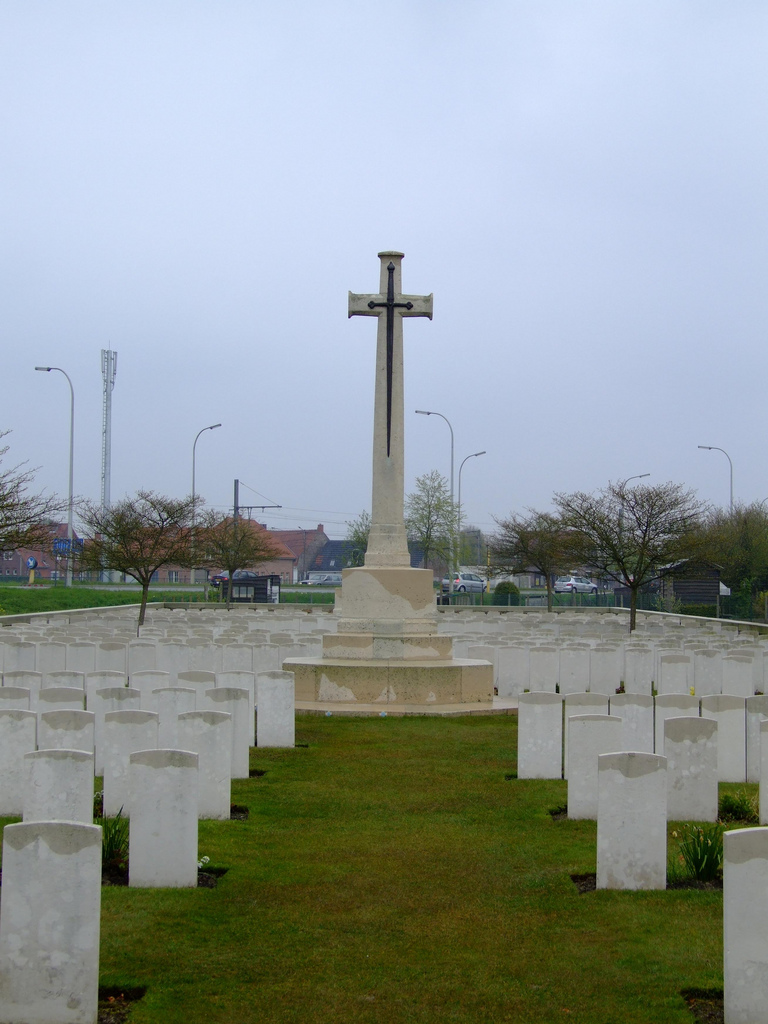
Brandhoek New Military Cemetery war cross

Brandhoek is a small hamlet in Belgium situated between Ypres, Vlamertinge and Poperinge just off the N308/N38.

Brandhoek was used as a Field Ambulance and Casualty Clearing Station during World War I and contains three Commonwealth War Graves Commission cemeteries:

- Brandhoek Military with 601 burials
- Brandhoek New Military with 514 burials, including Captain Noel Chavasse, Double VC (a memorial plaque is situated just outside Brandhoek Church with the British flag flying) and also Private C.A. Rudd who was his batman.
- Brandhoek New Military No 3 with 849 Burials. A quarter of the graves are Royal Artillery due to the many gun positions in the vicinity.
