= Red Farm Military Cemetery =

British war cemetery in Vlamertinge, Belgium

Coordinates: 50°51′18″N 2°46′50″E

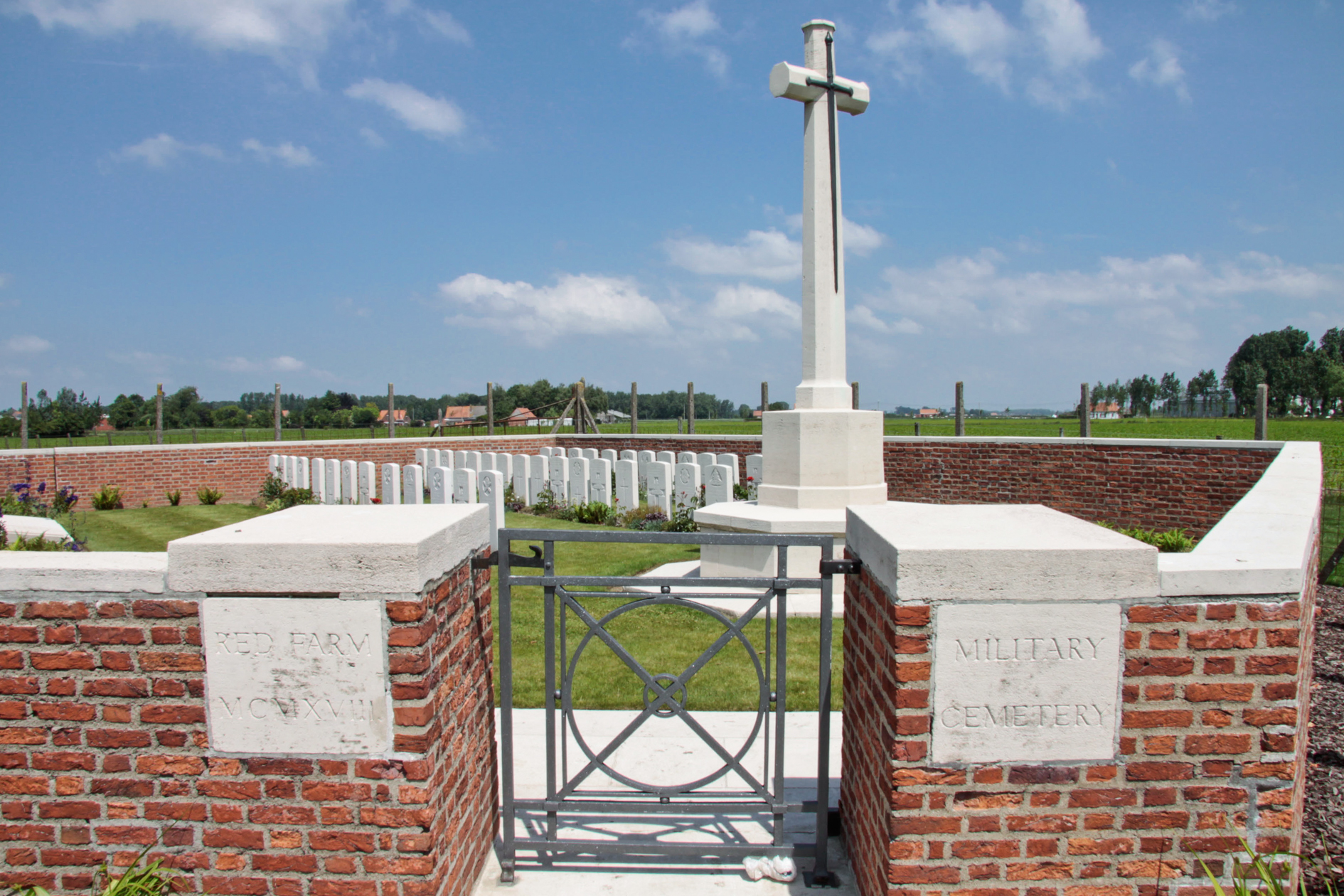
Cemetery gate

Red Farm Military Cemetery is a British military cemetery with fallen from the First World War, located in the Belgian village of Vlamertinge (Ypres). The cemetery is located about 2.9 km west of the village center, in the hamlet of Brandhoek. It was designed by Arthur Hutton and is maintained by the Commonwealth War Graves Commission. With an area of only 172 m^{2}, it is one of the smallest British cemeteries. The site is enclosed by a brick wall and is accessible via a grass path of 25 m. The Cross of Sacrifice is close to the entrance on the southern side. 49 dead are commemorated.
