= Brandhoek New Military Commonwealth War Graves Commission Cemetery =

WWI CWGC cemetery in Ypres, Belgium

Brandhoek New Military
- Commonwealth War Graves Commission
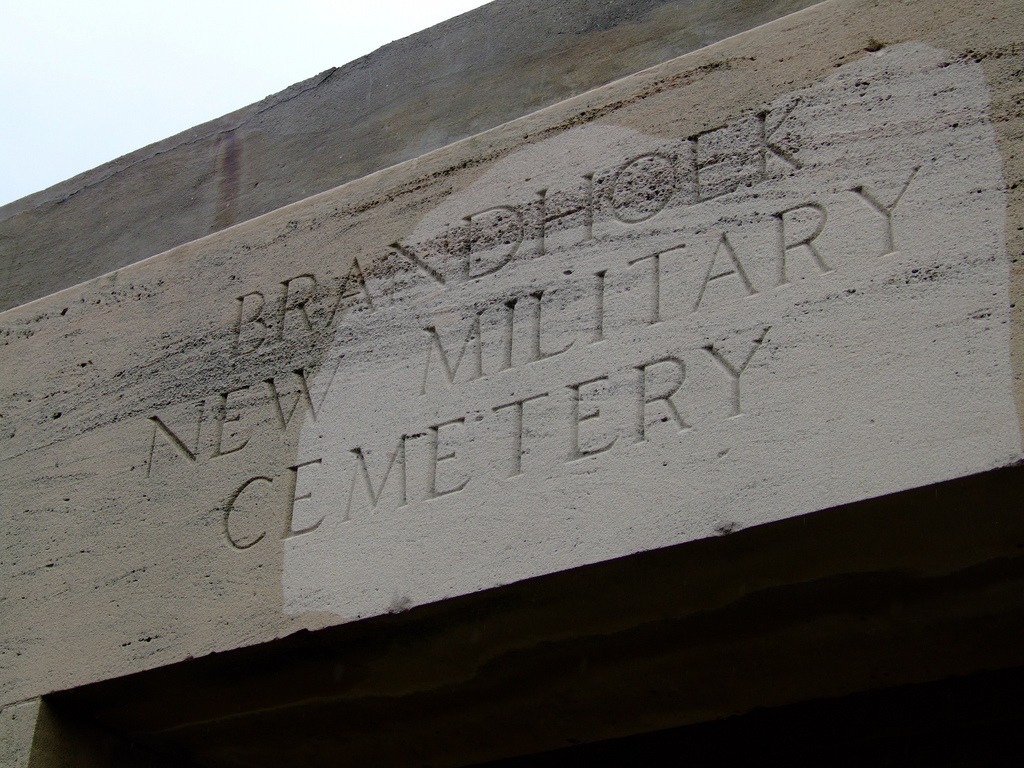
- Used for those deceased 1917
- Established: July 1917
- Location: 50°51′10″N 02°47′16″E near Ypres, West Flanders, Belgium
- Designed by: Sir Reginald Blomfield
- Total burials: 558

Burials by nation
- Allies of World War I: United Kingdom: 512; Australia: 11; Canada: 6; Undivided India: 1; Central Powers: Germany: 28

Burials by war
- World War I: 558

Brandhoek New Military Cemetery is a Commonwealth War Graves Commission burial ground for the dead of the First World War located near Ypres (Dutch: Ieper) in Belgium on the Western Front.

The cemetery grounds were assigned to the United Kingdom in perpetuity by King Albert I of Belgium in recognition of the sacrifices made by the British Empire in the defence and liberation of Belgium during the war.

== Foundation ==
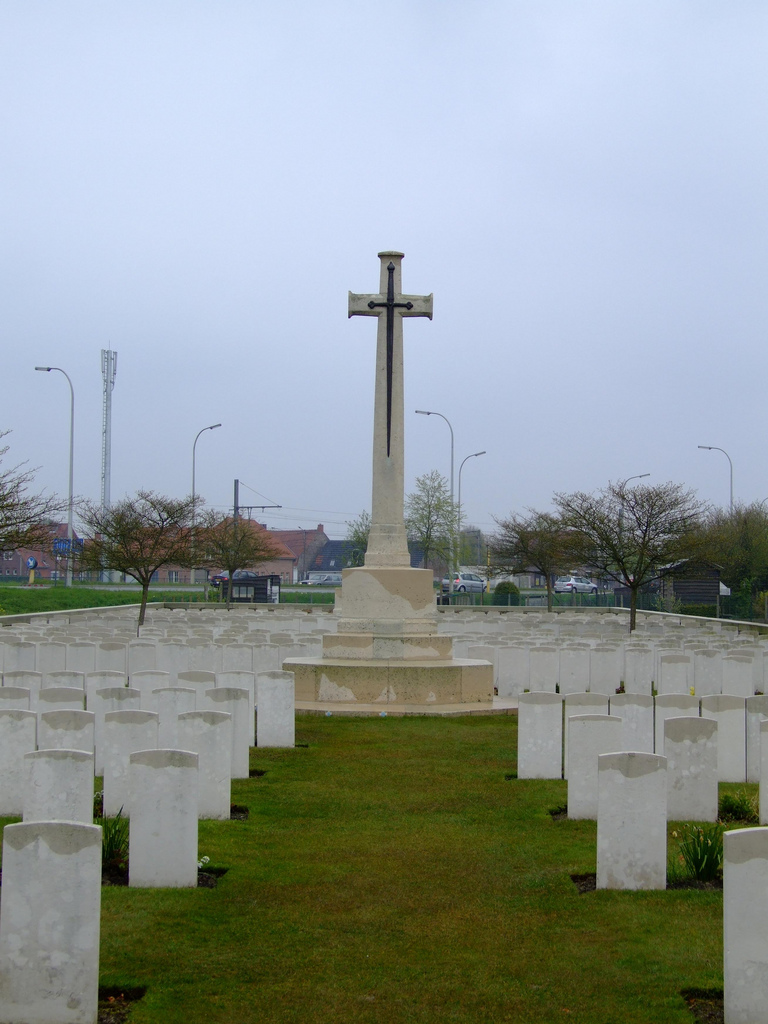
The War Cross

The cemetery was begun by the British in July 1917 to replace the nearby Brandhoek Military Cemetery, which closed with the arrival of the 32nd, 3rd Australian and 44th Casualty Clearing Stations as part of the preparations for the Battle of Passchendaele.

The cemetery closed a month later and Brandhoek New Military No 3 Cemetery opened to replace it.

The cemetery was designed by Sir Reginald Blomfield.

Brandhoek New Military Cemetery, located near Ypres (Ieper) in Belgium, was established in July 1917 to accommodate casualties from the Battle of Passchendaele. Designed by Sir Reginald Blomfield, the cemetery contains 558 burials, including 512 from the United Kingdom, 11 from Australia, 6 from Canada, and 1 from undivided India. Notably, it is the final resting place of Captain Dr. Noel Godfrey Chavasse, a double recipient of the Victoria Cross and the Military Cross, who died from wounds sustained during the battle.

The cemetery is situated approximately 6.5 km west of Ypres town centre, along Zevekotestraat, a road connecting Ypres to Poperinge. Visitors can access the site via the N308 road, turning onto Grote Branderstraat, then Zevekotestraat. The cemetery is located 300 meters along Zevekotestraat on the right-hand side of the road, beyond the N38 dual carriageway, which it is necessary to cross.

Adjacent to the Brandhoek New Military Cemetery is the Brandhoek Military Cemetery, which contains 671 burials, including 602 from the United Kingdom, 4 from Australia, and 63 from Canada. This cemetery was established in May 1915 and closed in July 1917 when the New Military Cemetery was opened.

Both cemeteries are maintained by the Commonwealth War Graves Commission, ensuring that the sacrifices of those who served are honored and remembered.
