= Westgate Water Tower =

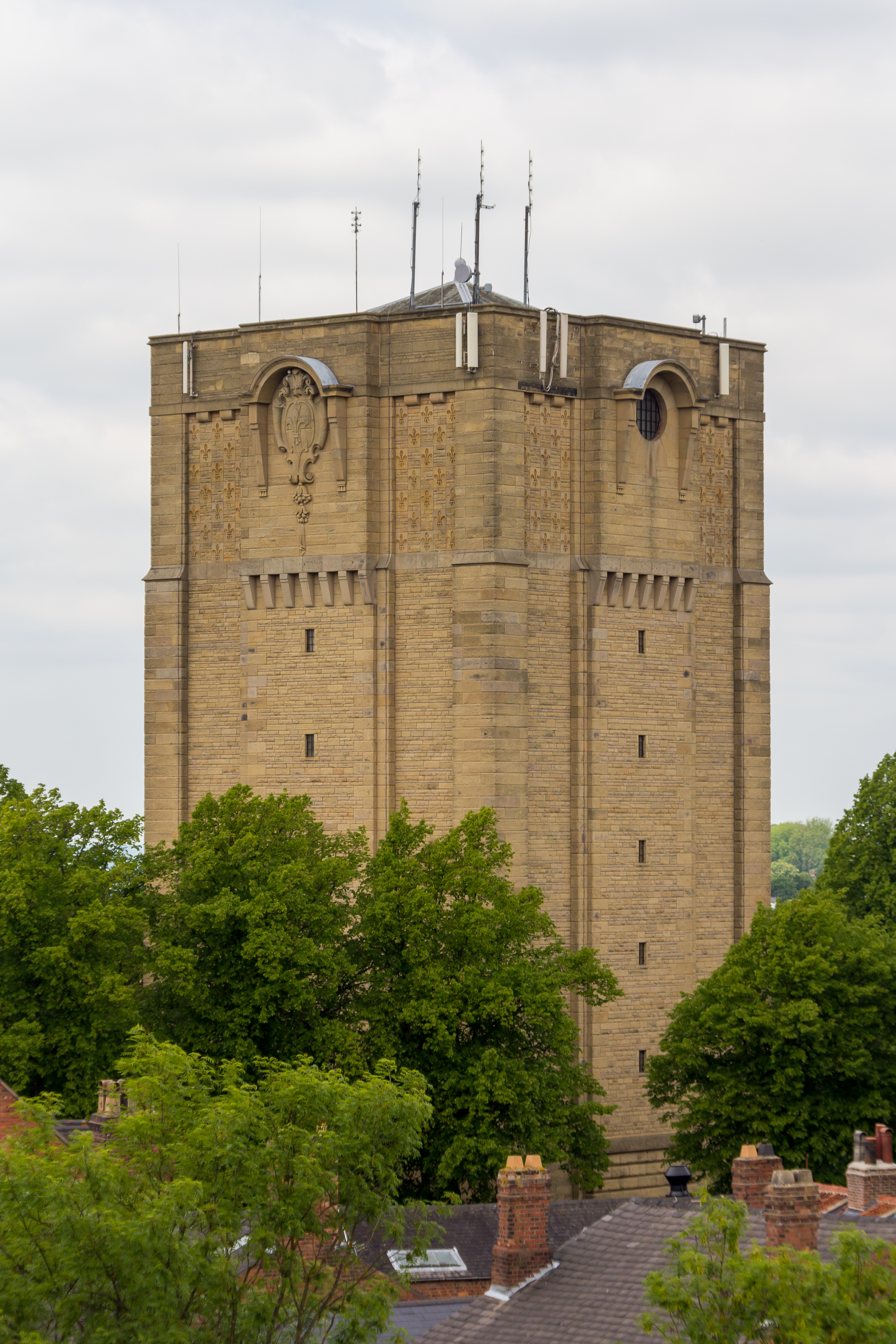
- Westgate water tower in 2013

- Location within Lincolnshire
- Alternative names: Lincoln water tower

General information
- Type: Water tower
- Coordinates: 53.236617°N 0.54106195°W
- Completed: 1911

Technical details
- Material: Stone

Design and construction
- Architect: Reginald Blomfield

The Westgate Water Tower, also known as the Lincoln Water Tower, is a historic water tower built in 1911. It is located on Westgate, in Lincoln, England. It is a Grade II listed building.

== History ==
The tower was designed by Reginald Blomfield in the Baroque revival style. It is square in plan and measures 117 feet (36 m) high. The Lincoln Corporation commissioned the project following a typhoid outbreak in 1904–1905, which killed 113 people. To provide a safer supply, the tower drew water from the reservoir at Bracebridge Heath rather than the polluted sources at Hartsholme Lake and the River Witham.

The internal tank measures 15.9 metres (52 ft) in diameter and can hold 1.356 million litres of water. It remains in use today and is operated by Anglian Water.
