= Vedast =

Frankish bishop and saint

Saint Vedast
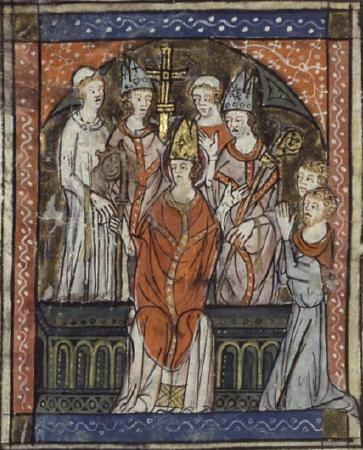
- The ordination of Saint Vedast
- Born: c. 453; France
- Died: 540
- Venerated in: Eastern Orthodox Church; Roman Catholic Church
- Canonized: Pre-Congregation
- Feast: February 6
- Attributes: a child at his feet; a bear; bishop with a wolf carrying a goose in its mouth
- Patronage: invoked on behalf of children who walk with difficulty for diseases of the eyes diocese of Arras, Boulogne and Saint-Omer, France; France

Vedast or Vedastus, also known as Saint Vaast (in Flemish, Norman and Picard) or Saint Waast (also in Picard and Walloon), Saint Gaston in French, and Foster in English (died c. 540) was an early bishop in the Frankish realm. After the victory of Tolbiac Vedast helped instruct the Frankish king Clovis in the Christian faith of his wife, Queen Clotilde.

Opinions differ as to whether Remigius, bishop of Reims, entrusted the diocese of Arras and diocese of Cambrai to Vedast as is traditionally held, or if Vedast was more an itinerant bishop without a specific see.

== Career ==
Vedast was probably born in the village of Villae in Périgord. As a young man, he moved to Toul, where the bishop, taking notice of his many virtues, ordained him to the priesthood.

Clovis, King of Franks, while returning from his victory over the Alemanni, was on his way to Rheims and contemplating baptism to the faith of his wife, Clotilde, and stopped at Toul to request some priest to instruct him on the way. Vedast agreed to accompany the king.

It is believed that in 499, Remigius named him the first bishop of Arras, France; around 510, he was also given oversight over Cambrai. However, more modern studies regard Vedast "...as an itinerant bishop who had no clearly defined bishopric."

== Hagiography ==
Within Christian sacred tradition extraordinary healings were attributed to his intercession. One account says that while on the road to Rheims, they encountered a blind beggar at the bridge over the river Aisne. The man besought Vedast's assistance. The priest prayed and blessed the beggar, at which point the man recovered his sight. This increased Vedast's esteem in the eyes of the king and he became one of the King's advisers.

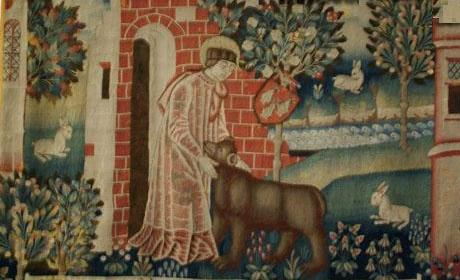
St Vedast and the beast

Jonas of Bobbio wrote a Vita Vedastis to promote the cult of Vedast at the cathedral in Arras. He "presents Vedast as the model ascetic-bishop for the new Columbanian monk-bishops who occupied many of the sees of Neustria after the unification of the kingdom under Chlothar II in 613." The incident of expelling the bear from the city mirrors Columbanus expelling a bear from his hermitage at Annegray.

A Vita of Vedast by Alcuin recounts a story that on one occasion, having spent the day in instructing a nobleman, his host would see him on his way with a glass of wine to sustain him, but found the cask empty. Vedast bid the servant to bring whatever he should find in the vessel. The servant then found the barrel overflowing with excellent wine.

== Death and veneration ==
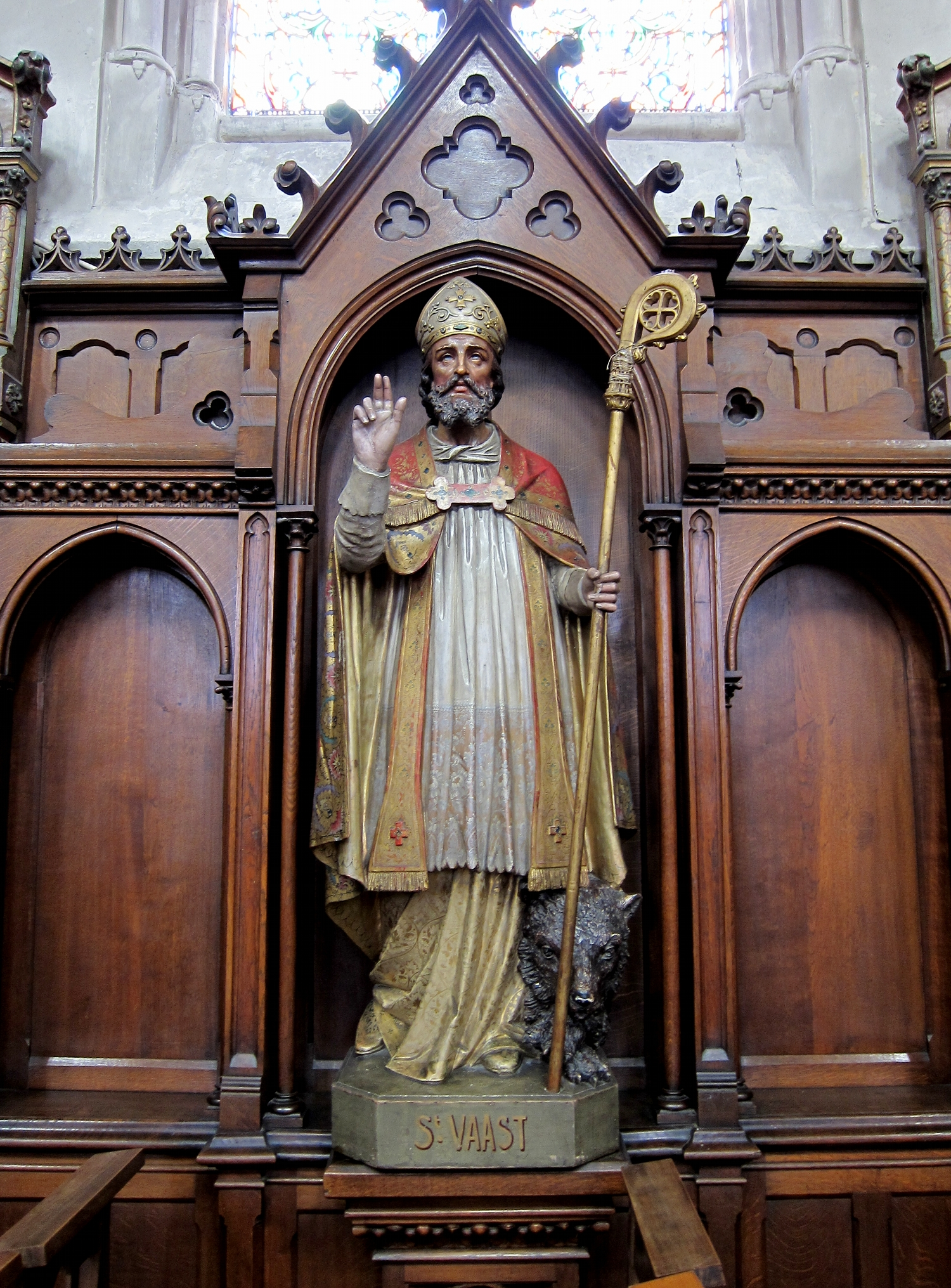
The statue of St Vedast in the church of St Vedast in Wambrechies

He died about 540 at Arras; that night the locals reportedly saw a luminous cloud ascend from his house, apparently carrying away Vedast's soul. Vedast was buried in the old cathedral in Arras; his relics were later transferred to the new Abbey of St. Vaast founded in his honour in Arras.

Vedast was venerated in Belgium as well as England (from the 10th century) where he was known as Saint Foster. St. Vedast Church, Vlamertinge is named for him. The spread of his cult was aided by the presence of Augustinians from Arras in England in the 12th century. Three ancient churches in England – St Vedast Foster Lane in London, and in Norwich and Tathwell in Lincolnshire – were dedicated to him.

His feast is on 6 February.

=== Patronage ===
He is a patron saint invoked against eye trouble.

== Bibliography ==
- Dales, Douglas (2013). Alcuin: Theology and Thought. Cambridge UK: James Clarke & Co. pp. 122–131, 189–190. ISBN 978-0-227-17394-7.
- The Historical Works of Venerable Bede: Biographical writings, letters, and chronology. Vol. 2. Translated by Giles, J.A. London: J. Bohn. 1845. pp. 115–134. [Alcuin's life]
- Jonas (Abbas Elnonensis) (1905). Krusch, Bruno (ed.). Ionae Vitae Sanctorum Columbani, Vedastis, Iohannis. Monumenta Germaniae Historica (in German and Latin). Hannover: Impensis Bibliopolii Hahniani.
- Kreiner, Jamie (2014). The Social Life of Hagiography in the Merovingian Kingdom. Cambridge University Press. pp. 101–103, 160, 237–263. ISBN 978-1-107-05065-5.
- Shanzer, Danuta (2002). Avitus of Vienne. Liverpool University Press. pp. 362–373. ISBN 978-0-85323-588-0. [letter of Avitus on Clovis' baptism]
- Simpson, William Sparrow; Simpson, Gertrude Sparrow (1896). Carmina Vedastina. London: Elliot Stock.
- van der Essen, Léon (1907). Étude critique et littéraire sur les vitae des saints mérovingiens de l'ancienne Belgique (in French). Louvain: Bureaux du recueil. pp. 211–216. [Jonas]
