= St. Vedast Church, Vlamertinge =

Coordinates: 50.8550°N 2.8214°E

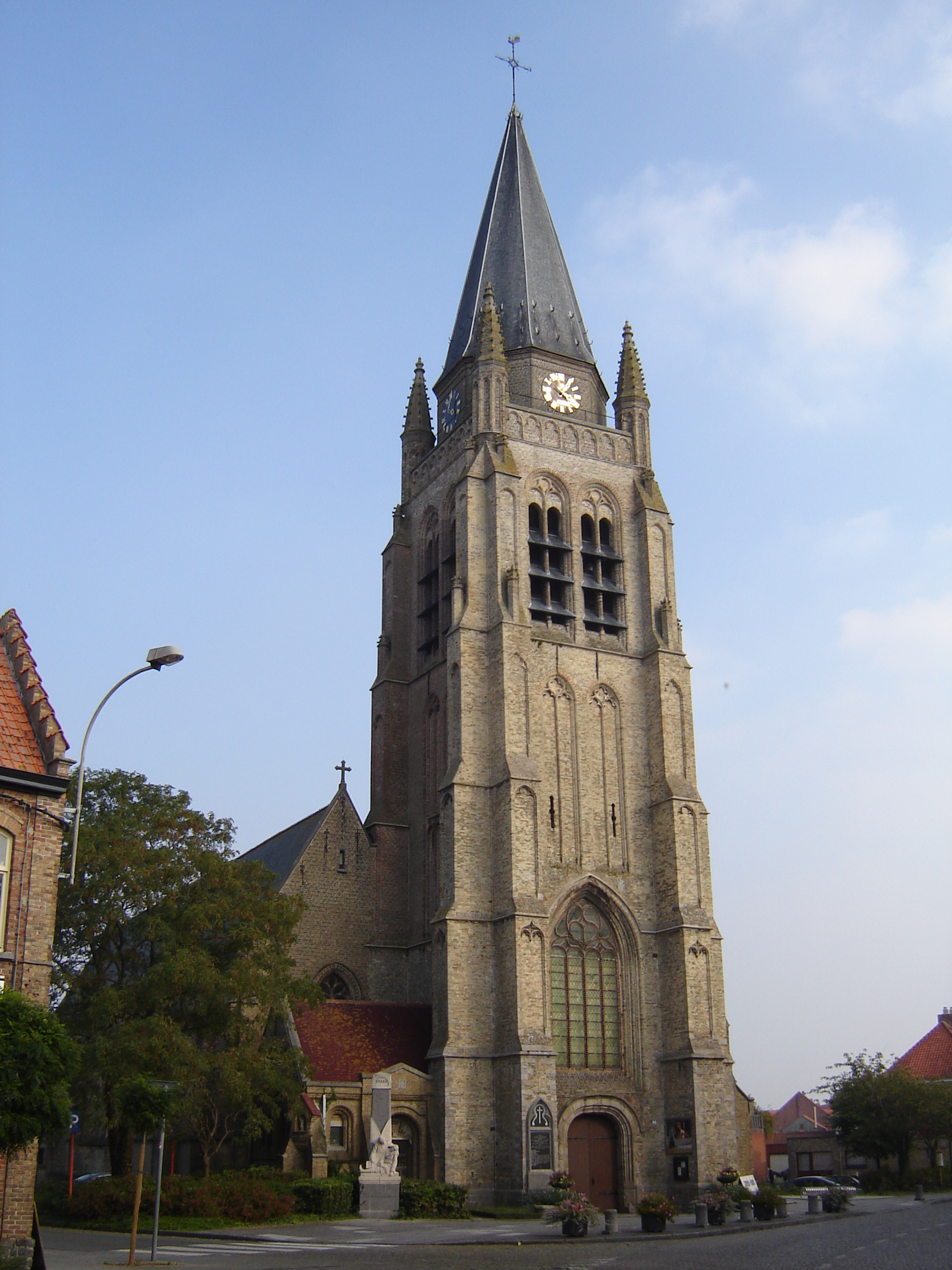

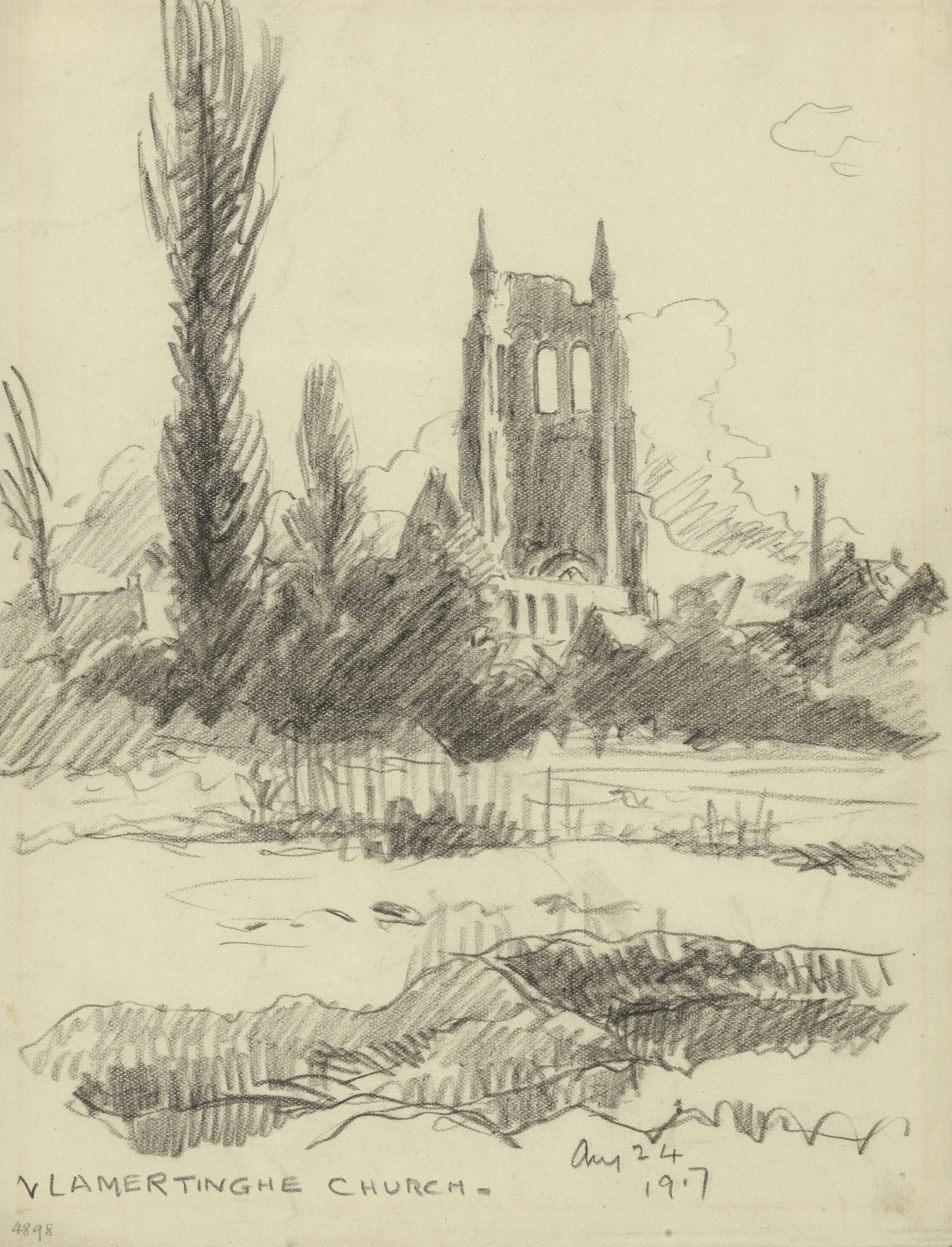

The St. Vedast Church (Dutch: Sint-Vedastuskerk) is a church in Vlamertinge, Belgium.

== History ==
The church is named after the holy Vedastus. In 857 a chapel would have been built for the first time. Afterwards, the church was destroyed a number of times and rebuilt each time. In 1301 a new church was built.

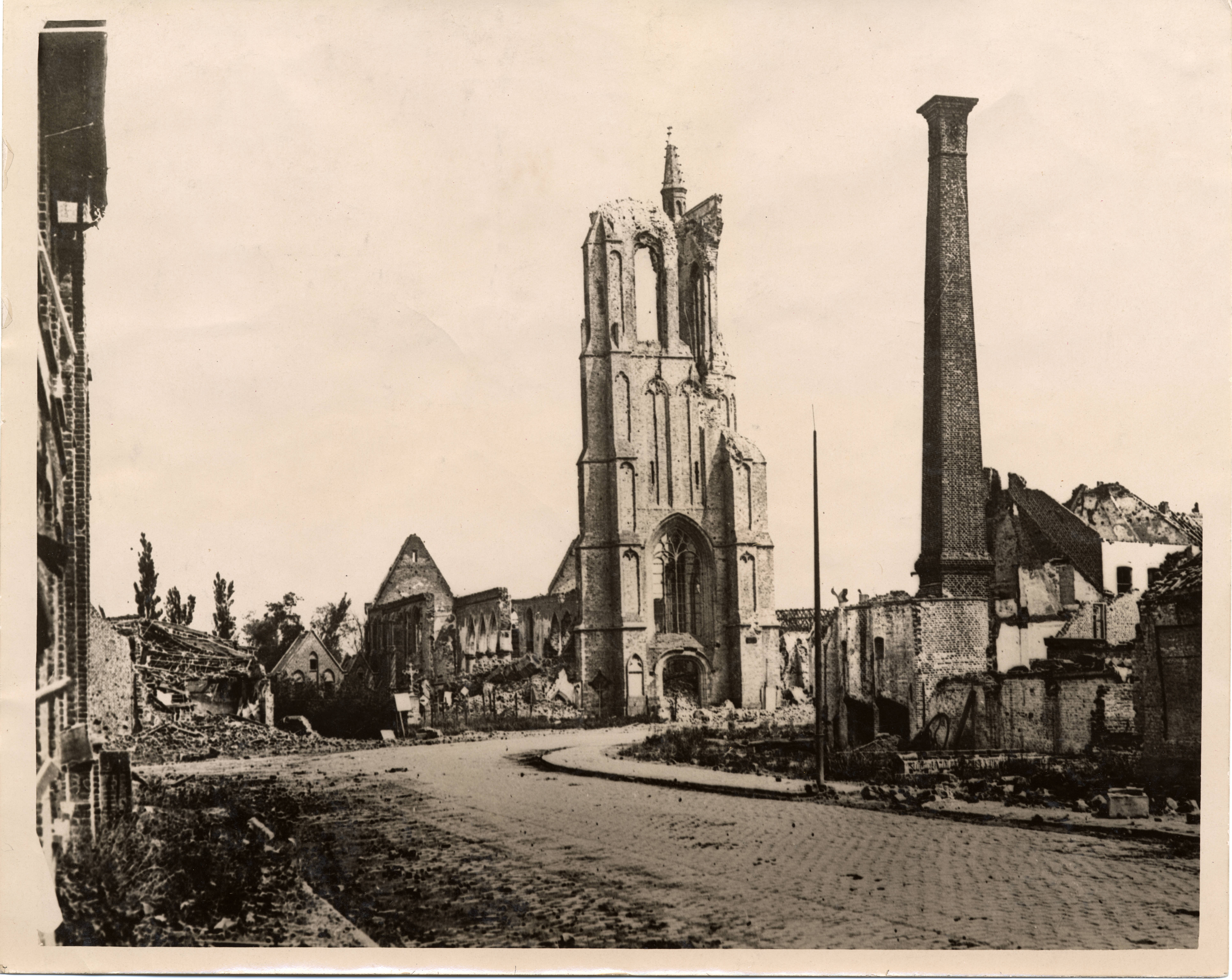

In 1566 the place of worship was destroyed again. During the First Coalition War in 1793 the French set the church on fire because they lost their front line, which also ran through Ypres.

In the beginning of the 20th century, the tower was thoroughly renewed. The church suffered damage during bombing in the First and Second World War. So on June 12, 1915, the church burnt down after being shot. During the renovation works, the prewar original tower was taken into account as much as possible.

== Architecture ==
The current hall church has been built in neo-Gothic style. The tower is 64.37 meters high.

== Sources ==
- http://www.kerkeninvlaanderen.be/pages/kerk_00288.htm
- http://www.kerkinieper.be/kerken/sint-vedastus-vlamertinge
- https://www.flickr.com/photos/erfgoed/8471616298
- https://www.hln.be/regio/ieper/opmerkelijke-voorwerpen-in-sint-vedastuskerk~aad4056c/
- https://www.dekroniekenvandewesthoek.be/de-nieuwe-kerk-van-vlamertinge/
