= Brandhoek New Military Number 3 Commonwealth War Graves Commission Cemetery =

War cemetery in Belgium

Brandhoek New Military No 3
- Commonwealth War Graves Commission
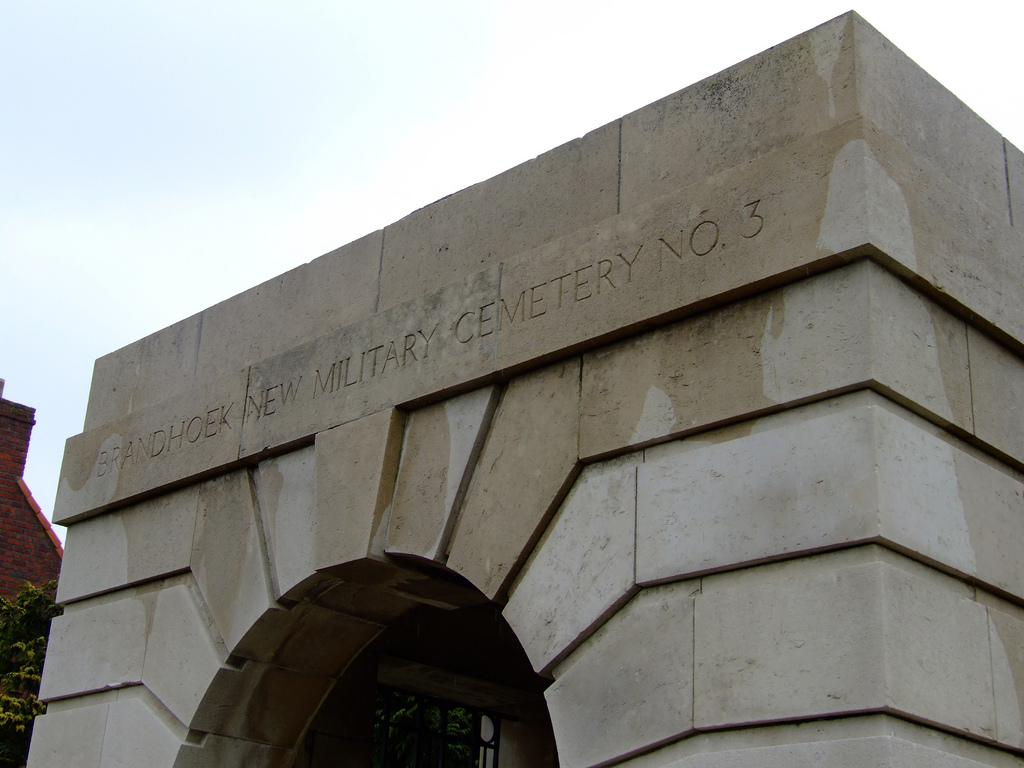
- Used for those deceased 1917–1918
- Established: August 1917
- Location: 50°51′06″N 02°47′16″E near Ypres, West Flanders, Belgium
- Designed by: Sir Reginald Blomfield
- Total burials: 975

Burials by nation
- Allies of World War I: United Kingdom: 852; Australia: 46; Canada: 54; New Zealand: 18; South Africa: 5

Burials by war
- World War I: 975

Brandhoek New Military Cemetery Number 3 is a Commonwealth War Graves Commission burial ground for the dead of the First World War located near Ypres (Dutch: Ieper) in Belgium on the Western Front.

The cemetery grounds were assigned to the United Kingdom in perpetuity by King Albert I of Belgium in recognition of the sacrifices made by the British Empire in the defence and liberation of Belgium during the war.

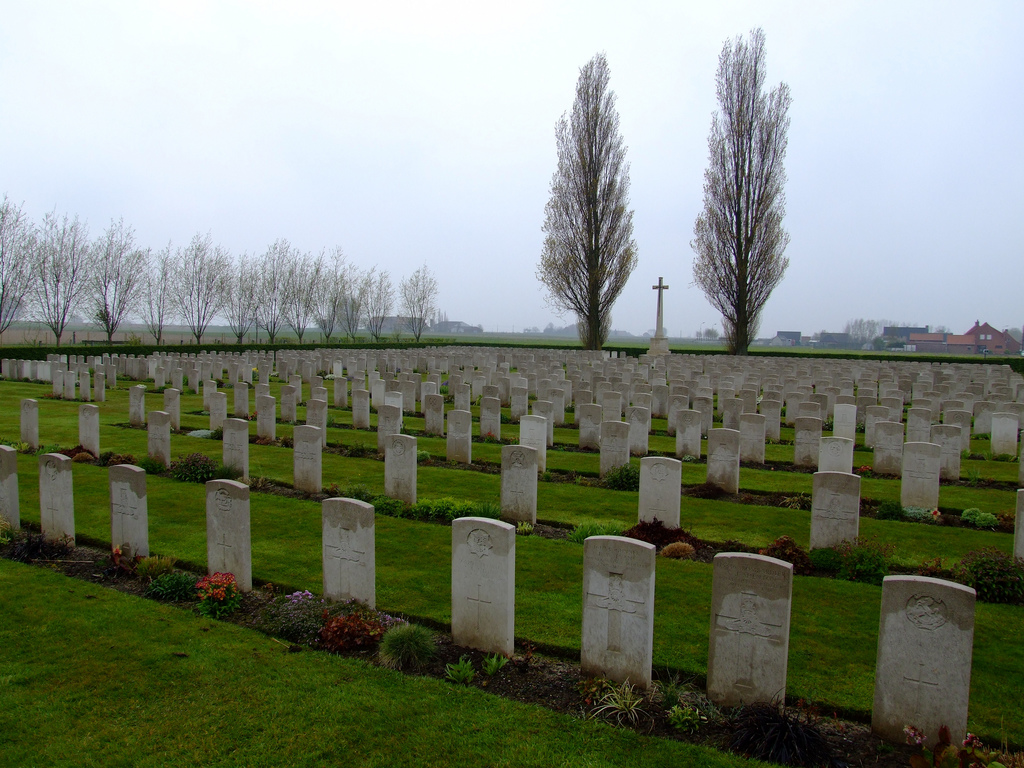
The cemetery

== Foundation ==
The cemetery was begun by the British in August 1917 during the Battle of Passchendaele to replace the nearby Brandhoek New Military Cemetery.

The cemetery was designed by Sir Reginald Blomfield, with the gates being presented by the father of Lt AH Strutt, one of the soldiers buried within.
