= Brandhoek Military Cemetery =

CWGC cemetery in Belgium

Brandhoek Military
- Commonwealth War Graves Commission
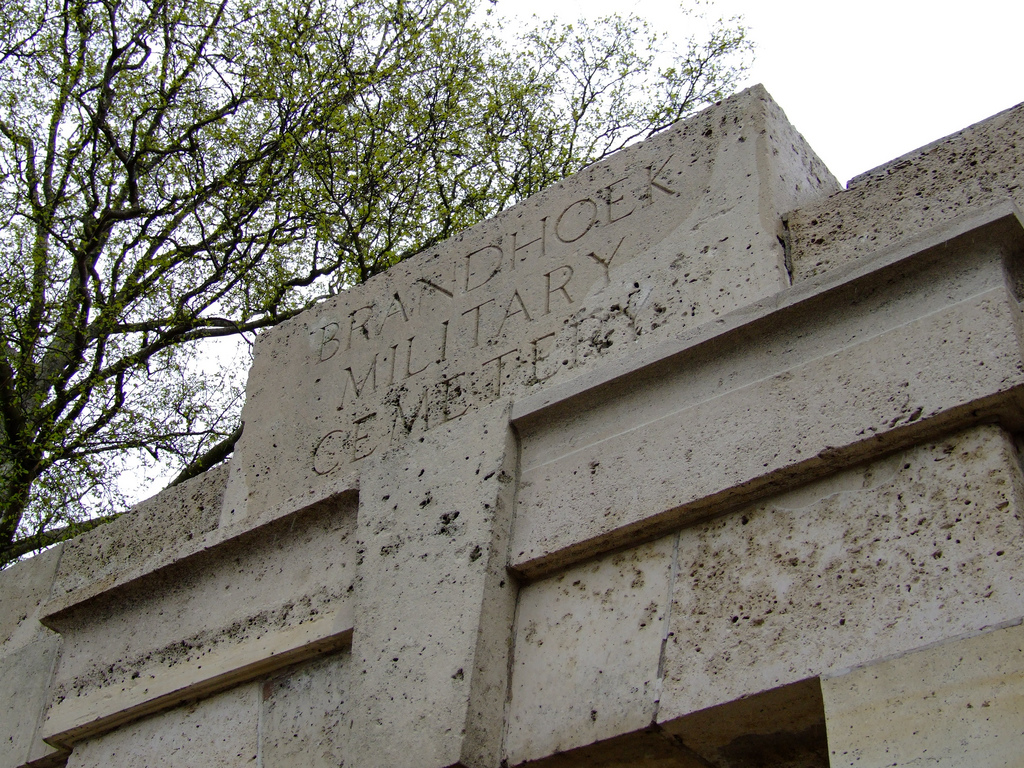
- Used for those deceased 1915–1917
- Established: May 1915
- Location: 50°51′10″N 02°47′29″E near Ypres, West Flanders, Belgium
- Designed by: Sir Reginald Blomfield
- Total burials: 671

Burials by nation
- Allies of World War I: United Kingdom: 602; Australia: 4; Canada: 63; Central Powers: Germany: 2

Burials by war
- World War I: 671

Brandhoek Military Cemetery is a Commonwealth War Graves Commission burial ground for the dead of the First World War located in Vlamertinge in Belgium on the Western Front.

The cemetery grounds were assigned to the United Kingdom in perpetuity by King Albert I of Belgium in recognition of the sacrifices made by the British Empire in the defence and liberation of Belgium during the war.

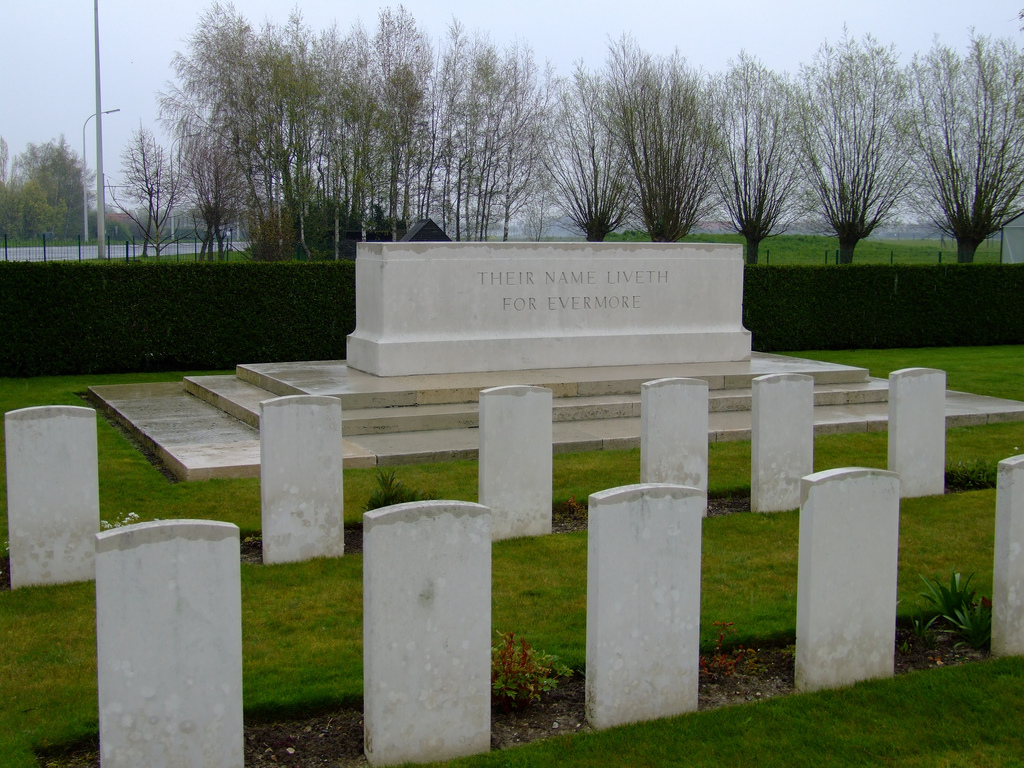
The War Stone

== Foundation ==
The cemetery was begun by the British in May 1915 in a field next to a dressing station. The cemetery was closed in July 1917 when Brandhoek New Military Cemetery was opened.

The cemetery was designed by Sir Reginald Blomfield.
