= Vlamertinge =

Town in West Flanders, Belgium

- Town
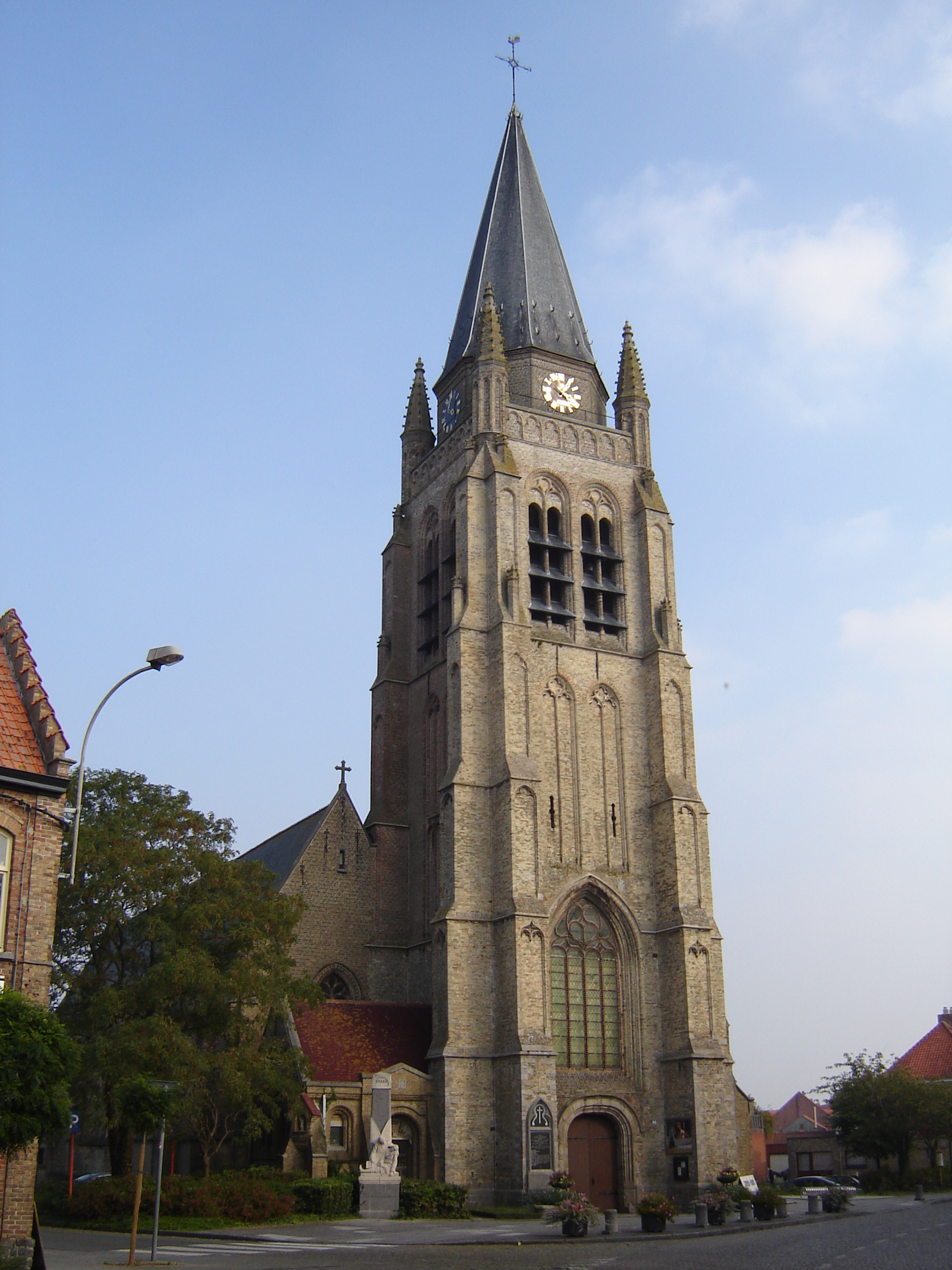
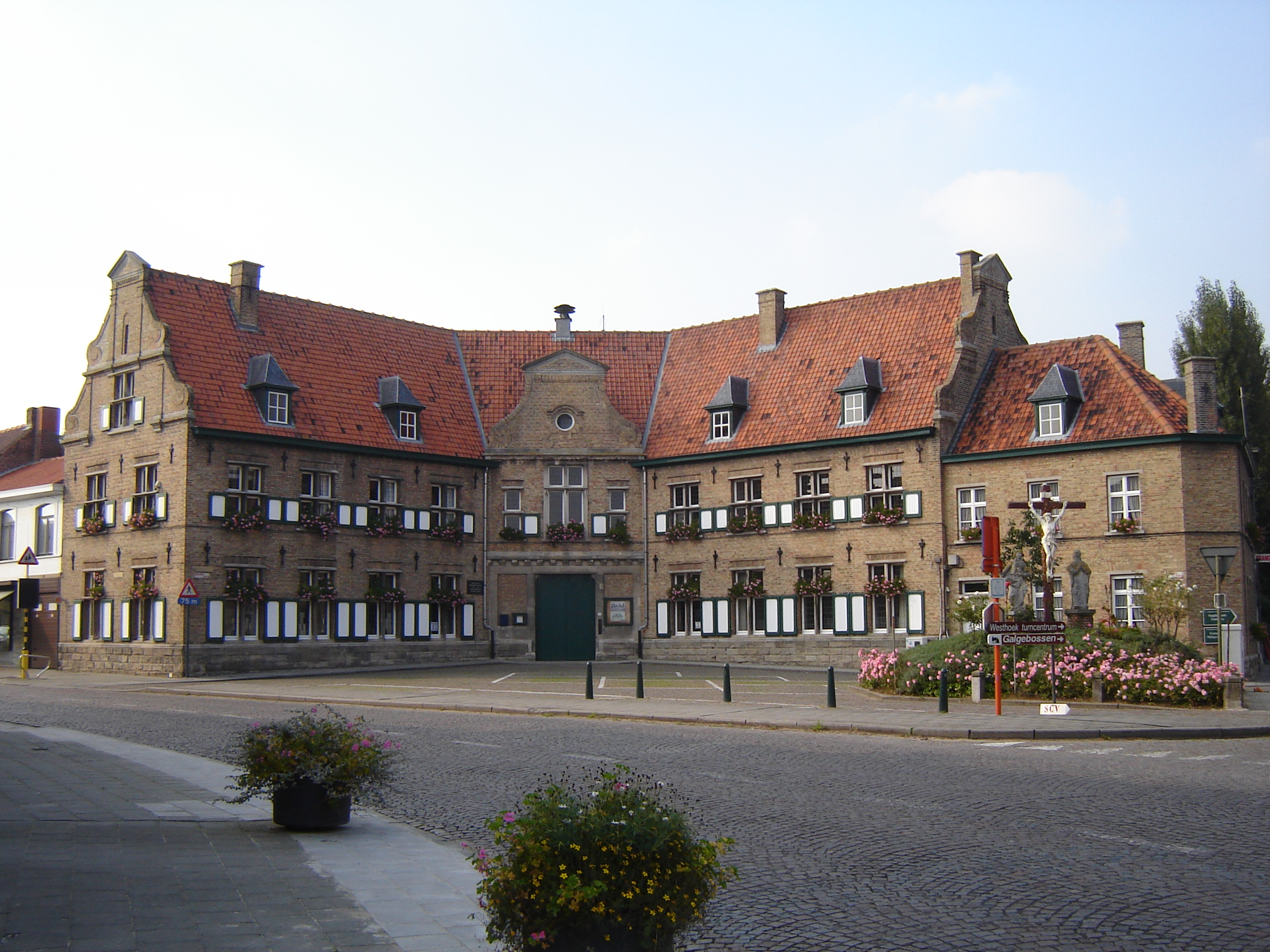
- From top to bottom: Saint Vedast Church and Former Town Hall Building

- Coat of arms

- Location in Ypres

- Location in Belgium
- Coordinates: 50°51′N 2°49′E
- Country: Belgium
- Region: Flanders
- Province: West Flanders
- Municipality: Ypres
- Elevation: 17 m (56 ft)
- Time zone: UTC+1 (CET)
  - Summer (DST): UTC+2 (CEST)
- Postcode: 8908
- Area code: (+32) 57

Vlamertinge is a village in the Belgian province of West Flanders and a borough of the city of Ypres. The village centre of Vlamertinge lies just outside the city centre of Ypres, along the main road N38 to the nearby town of Poperinge.

In addition to the city centre of Ypres itself, Vlamertinge is the largest borough of Ypres. In the west of Vlamertinge, along the road to Poperinge, is the hamlet of Brandhoek.

== History ==
The earliest data about Vlamertinge date from the Middle Ages. In 857 a chapel was built in Vlamertinge. In 970 Ypres was destroyed and the chapel of Vlamertinge burned down. The oldest document, known to date, which includes the name Flambertenges, is a deed of the year 1066. Baldwin V, Count of Flanders, his wife Adela and their son Baldwin, in this deed gave goods to the church and the Chapter (religion) from Sint-Pieters by Lille. These goods were, among others, a tenth located in Elverdinge and also a tenth located in Vlamertinge - "In territorio Furnensi, in villa Elverzenges, decinam unam; Flambertenges decinam similiter unam".

In the Ancien Régime Vlamertinge was a "Heerlijkheid" of Veurne-Ambacht with 22 backlendings and suffered a lot from the sieges of nearby Ypres.

During the First World War, the whole village was destroyed by bombing. In 1944, during the Second World War, Vlamertinge was liberated by a Polish armored division.

== Etymology ==
Vlamertinge would come from Flambert (a name) + inga (son, descendant of (genitive)) + heim (domicile). The oldest known spellings of the current Vlamertinge are: Flembertenges (1066), Flamertingha (1123), Flambertinghes (1142), Flamertinge (1154), Flamertinga (1185), Flamertinghe (1200), Flambertengues (1202), Flamertinghes (1238), Flamertinges (1269), Vlamertinghe (1272), Vlamertinghes (1275), Flamertenghe (1275), Vlamertincghe (1280), etc.

== Geography ==
Vlamertinge is 17 meters above sea level. The municipality also borders Ypres in the East, Voormezele in the Southeast, Kemmel and Dikkebus in the South, Reningelst in the Southwest, Poperinge in the West, Elverdinge in the North and Brielen in the Northeast.

== Demographic developments ==
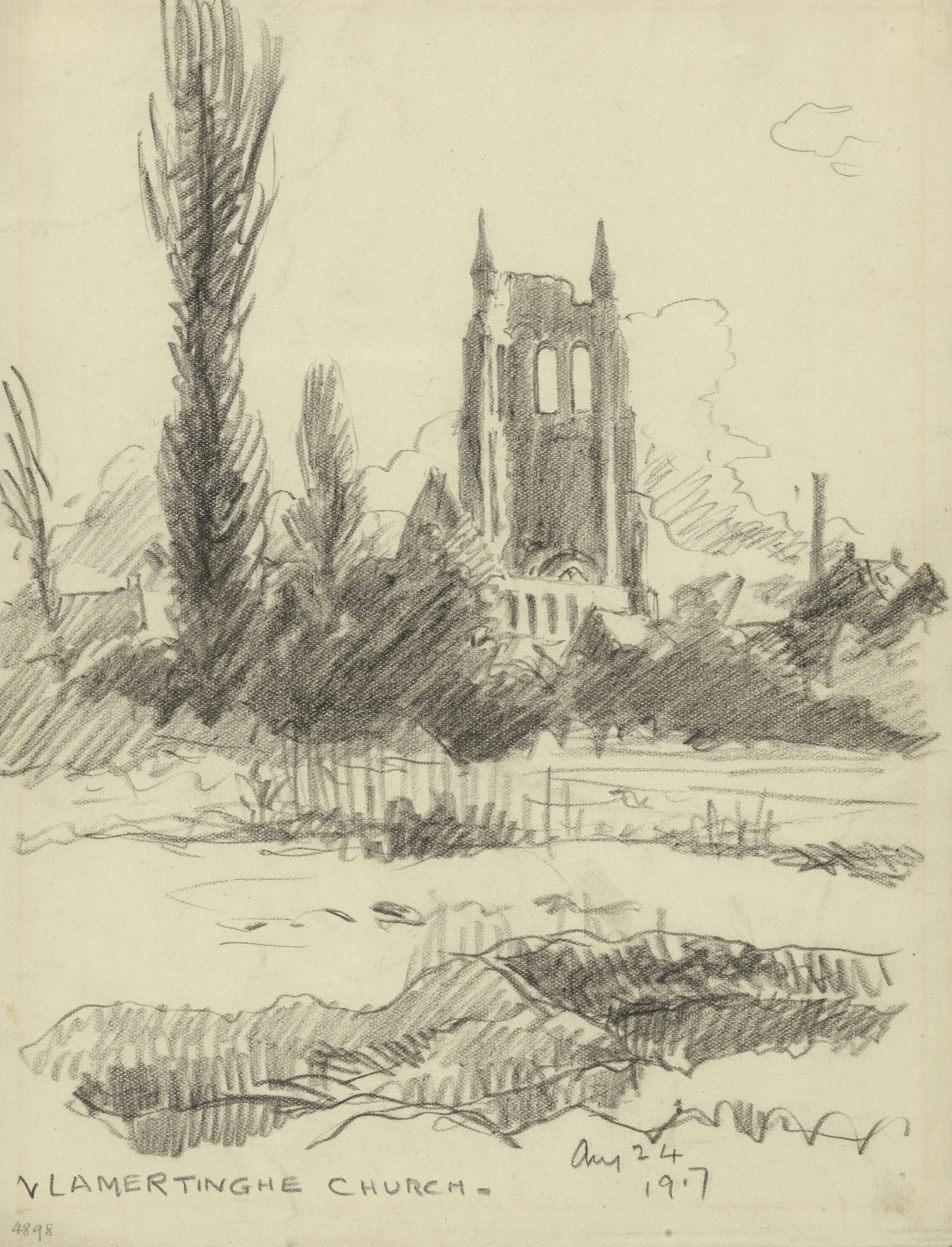

From 1487 to 1697 we see a large decline in the population of Vlamertinge. The most plausible explanation for this would have been the Eighty Years' War in the Seventeen Provinces.

Historical population

Year	Pop.	±%
1487	3,210	—
1616	68	−97.9%
1620	76	+11.8%
1688	1,028	+1252.6%
1693	912	−11.3%
1697	846	−7.2%
1795	1,236	+46.1%
1796	1,670	+35.1%
1800	1,934	+15.8%
1801	1,796	−7.1%
1806	2,304	+28.3%
1810	2,240	−2.8%
1814	2,244	+0.2%
1815	2,244	+0.0%
1818	2,271	+1.2%
1821	2,321	+2.2%

Year	Pop.	±%
1829	2,478	+6.8%
1830	2,439	−1.6%
1833	2,685	+10.1%
1846	2,760	+2.8%
1866	2,861	+3.7%
1877	3,237	+13.1%
1890	3,250	+0.4%
1896	3,245	−0.2%
1908	3,425	+5.5%
1910	3,534	+3.2%
1918	1,071	−69.7%
1919	758	−29.2%
1921	3,634	+379.4%
1930	3,689	+1.5%
1944	3,580	−3.0%
1949	3,568	−0.3%

Year	Pop.	±%
1951	3,528	−1.1%
1952	3,537	+0.3%
1971	3,672	+3.8%
1976	3,805	+3.6%
1981	3,681	−3.3%
1986	3,673	−0.2%
1989	3,699	+0.7%
1991	3,666	−0.9%
1998	3,801	+3.7%
1999	3,778	−0.6%
2002	3,723	−1.5%
2011	3,606	−3.1%
2013	3,836	+6.4%
2016	3,581	−6.6%

== Economy ==
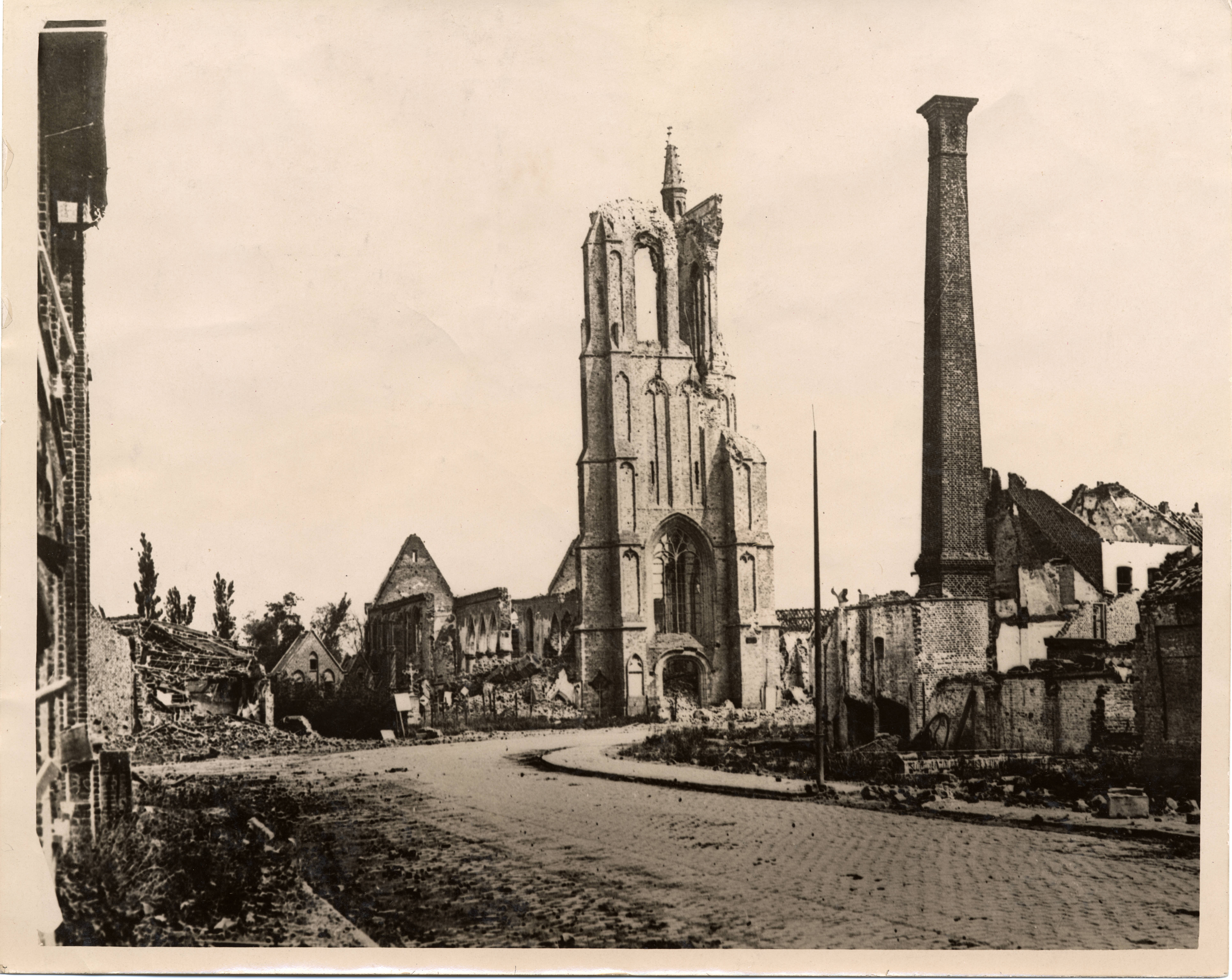

There are 70 to 80 stores in Vlamertinge. In Vlamertinge there is a large company Valcke that makes concrete constructions and therefore also offers employment for many people in the village. SNCB route 69 passes through the village as a single track line with three level crossings (one for cycles only). The hourly service each way stops at leper and terminates at Poperinge.

== Politics ==
=== Baljuws, lords & awnings ===
- 1???-13??: Nicolas Den Hane (baljuw)
- 1441-1445: Jan Van Gavere (baljuw)
- 1445-1447: Joris Paeldinc (baljuw)
- 1447-1449: Nikolaas Van Aeltre (baljuw)
- 1450-1451: Joost Van Gavere (baljuw)
- 1452-1453: Roeland Bride (baljuw)
- 1453-1457: Jaspar de Flandre (baljuw)
- 1550-1556: Clement De Schildere
- 1556-1561: Aernoud Porreye
- 1561-1581: Jan Looms (baljuw)
- 1581-1584: Thomas Van Der Zeerde
- 1586-1593: Mathieu Tasseel
- 1595-1675: Adrianus Cobbaert
- 16??-1646: Pierre Immeloot (lord)
- 1646-1653: David Immeloot (lord)
- 1653-1703: Balthazar Henricus Immeloot (lord)
- 16??-16??: Jan de Cerf (lord)
- 16??-1683: François de Cerf (lord)
- 1679-1???: Jean Charles Augustus-de Harchies (awning)
- 16??-1732: Jean-Baptiste Coppieters (lord)
- 1756-1782: Fernand Jean-Baptiste Coppieters (lord)

=== Mayors ===
Vlamertinge had its own municipal council and mayor until the mergers of 1977. Mayors were:

- 1796-1799: Joannes Baptiste Dionysius Gontier
- 1799-1806: Franciscus Dominicus Ludovicus Gryson
- 1806-1820: Joannes Ignatius Onraet
- 1820-1836: Lucien Boedt
- 1836-1842: Joseph Verminck
- 1843-1862: Dominique van Zuylen van Nyevelt
- 1862-1895: Jules Veys
- 1896-1909: Amand Vandaele
- 1910-1927: Evarist Vande Lanoitte
- 1927-1928: Marcel Vandenbulcke
- 1928-1946: Florentin Bouton
- 1941-1944: Rafaël Six
- 1947-1952: Usmar Bonte
- 1953-1970: Julien Bouton
- 1970-1976: Georges Platteau

== Sights ==
- The St. Vedast Church
- The former town hall of Vlamertinge from 1922, in neo-Flemish Renaissance style
- The Castle of Vlamertinge or Castle du Parc was built in 1857-1858 by order of the Viscount Pierre-Gustave du Parc, after a design by Joseph Schadde.
- In Vlamertinge there are a number of British military cemeteries from the First World War:
  - Brandhoek Military Cemetery
  - Red Farm Military Cemetery
  - Vlamertinghe Military Cemetery
  - Vlamertinghe New Military Cemetery
  - Railway Chateau Cemetery
  - Divisional Cemetery
  - Brandhoek New Military Cemetery
  - Brandhoek New Military Cemetery No.3
  - Hop Store Cemetery

== Associations ==
Vlamertinge has many associations. The largest association is Chiro Vlamertinge. This youth movement has activities every two weeks at their premises.

== Sport ==
- Football club KSK Vlamertinge has been affiliated with the Belgian Football Association since the 1930s and is active in the provincial series.

== Nickname ==
People speak of "Vlamertingse Pottebrekers"(Vlamertingisch pot crushers), and the pots that are meant here are obviously beer pots.

== Well-known inhabitants ==
- Joris Six

== Honorary citizens ==
- Jan Hoet (first person in the history of Vlamertinge who obtained honorary citizenship)
