= Reginald Blomfield =

English architect (1856–1942)

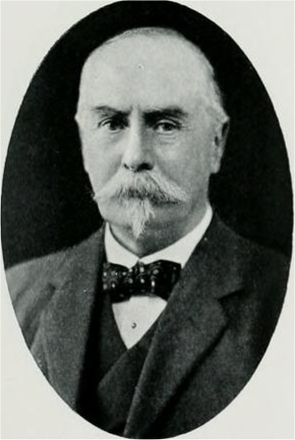
Blomfield in 1921

Sir Reginald Theodore Blomfield RA (20 December 1856 – 27 December 1942) was a prolific British architect, garden designer and author of the Victorian and Edwardian period.

== Early life and career ==
Blomfield was born at Bow rectory in Devon, where his father, the Rev. George John Blomfield (1822−1900), was rector. His mother, Isabella, was a first cousin of his father and the third daughter of Charles James Blomfield, Bishop of London. He was brought up in Kent, where his father became vicar of Holy Trinity Church, Dartford, in 1857 and then Rector of Aldington in 1868. He was educated at Highgate School in North London, whose Grade II listed war memorial he later designed, and then Haileybury and Imperial Service College in Hertfordshire, and at Exeter College, Oxford, where he took a first-class degree in classics. At Oxford, he attended John Ruskin's lectures, but found "the atmosphere of rapt adoration with which Ruskin and all he said was received by the young ladies... was altogether too much for me". Although he had a clear leaning towards the polite arts, his family did not have the means to sustain him as a gentleman artist, and Blomfield at this date had no clear career.

After Oxford, he spent a year travelling on the continent as a tutor before accepting an offer from his maternal uncle, Sir Arthur Blomfield, to become an articled pupil in his London practice in the autumn of 1881. He also enrolled in the Royal Academy Schools, where Richard Phené Spiers was Master of the Architectural School. He found the atmosphere in his uncle's office uncongenial and the practice's traditional Gothic Revival output hard and soulless, although he gained valuable mechanical skills at draughtsmanship and site experience. He prospered more at the Academy Schools, taking the junior prize in 1882 and the senior prize the following year, with a design for a town house in the fashionable Queen Anne Revival style, of which he was later ashamed. During his years in his uncle's office, the practice produced two uncharacteristic schemes (for work at Marlborough College and Shrewsbury School) that appear to foreshadow Blomfield's enthusiasm for classicism, and in the design of which he was presumably involved. He was an occasional cricketer and played in matches with J. M. Barrie's Allahakbarries XI.

== Design work ==
At the beginning of 1884, having completed his training, he left his uncle's office and spent a further four months travelling in France and Spain before returning to London and establishing a practice at 17 Southampton Street, off the Strand, in London; E.S. Prior had an office in the same building. Through Prior, a former pupil of Richard Norman Shaw, Blomfield met others of Shaw's circle, including Mervyn Macartney, Ernest Newton and Gerald Horsley. Although he never worked in Shaw's office, Blomfield was, like them, henceforth a great admirer of Shaw. With this ground, Blomfield was involved in the founding of the Art Workers Guild and was at first made its Honorary Secretary, but he attended infrequently and when admonished about this, resigned in a huff. In retrospect, however, he paid tribute to these efforts as formative in setting a new direction for architecture: "I think it is due to these young men of the 80s that the arts were rescued from the paralysing conventions of the Victorian era". In 1890, with the idea of designing and making fine furniture, Blomfield, Ernest Gimson, Macartney and William Lethaby joined forces to establish Kenton & Co. Although the venture had the makings of a success, it lasted only two years, as the partners decided to concentrate instead on their increasingly successful architectural practices.

On 7 February 1886 Blomfield married Anne Frances Burra, the daughter of Henry Burra of Rye, Sussex and a niece of Blomfield's stepmother, a town where he had designed several houses, including his own, the very informal Point Hill. The same year, Blomfield and the printer T.J. Cobden Sanderson (1840–1922) built themselves a pair of pretty houses in Frognal, Hampstead, Middlesex; 51 Frognal remained Blomfield's London home until his death.

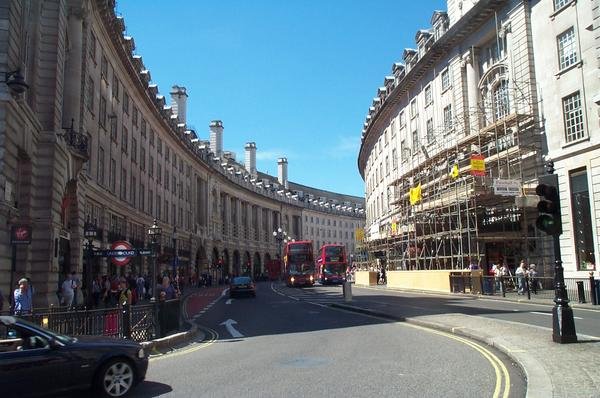
Regent Street, London

The heyday of Blomfield's practice, between 1885 and 1914, was dominated by the construction of new country houses and the renovation and extension of existing ones on the most generous scale. Notable among these works are the alteration of Apethorpe Hall, Northamptonshire (1906-09);Chequers, Buckinghamshire (mostly 1909–12), Heathfield Park, Sussex (1896–1910) and Brocklesby Park, Lincolnshire (1898–1910). The completely new buildings are mostly slightly smaller but still substantial; houses such as Wittington House at Medmenham, Buckinghamshire in 1897; Caythorpe Court, Lincolnshire; Moundsmere Manor. Hampshire; or Wretham Hall, Norfolk. Much of this work was carried out in a manner inspired by Blomfield's studies of both English and French Renaissance styles. Blomfield's fairly numerous university and commercial buildings also included a number of prestigious commissions, including the college buildings for Lady Margaret Hall, Oxford and the United Universities Club in London. He played a major part in the completion of the Quadrant on Regent Street, London when Richard Norman Shaw withdrew from the project. The First World War put an end to the type of building projects on which he had been engaged, and after it ended in 1919 his practice never returned to its former size. He was sixty-five in 1921, but continued working at a gradually decreasing pace into his late 70s, producing a large number of war memorials in the 1920s, including the Menin Gate in Ypres.

The Electricity (Supply) Act 1926 created a government body called the Central Electricity Board (CEB). The following year the CEB asked Blomfield to judge a competition to find a suitable design for the Transmission tower, which would be used to support overhead power lines. He chose the lattice design, submitted by the US engineering company, Milliken Brothers, which, today, carry electricity cabling across the United Kingdom.

Blomfield's last major project was the reconstruction of 4 Carlton Gardens, London, in 1932.

== Publications ==
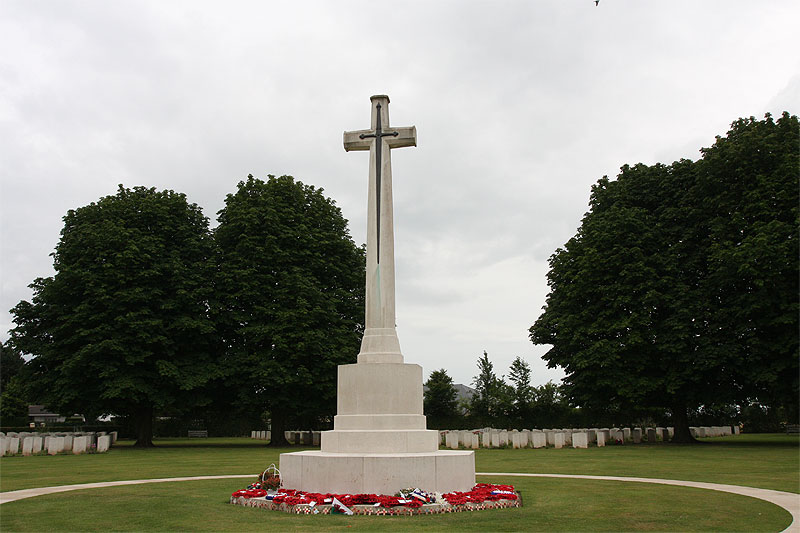
The Cross of Sacrifice in Bayeux War Cemetery in Normandy

Blomfield had a gift for sketching and writing. His first book, The Formal Garden in England, illustrated by Inigo Thomas, appeared in 1892. His views invoked the criticism of the gardener William Robinson, who pursued a lengthy dispute with those architects who dared to interest themselves in gardening, especially Blomfield and John Dando Sedding. In 1897 Blomfield's first major historical work, A history of Renaissance architecture in England, 1500–1800 was published by George Bell and Sons. The architecture of the Wren era in particular appealed to him, and he came to regard it as the era of England's finest architecture. This book was complemented by the appearance of a companion study, A history of French architecture, published in two volumes covering 1494–1661 (1911) and 1661–1774 (1921). Together with the work of Blomfield himself, Sir John Belcher and Mervyn Macartney, the arrival of a serious account of architectural development in the 17th and 18th centuries led not only to the preservation of many previously neglected buildings of those periods, but also increased interest in the neo-Georgian style.

His other published works include Studies in Architecture (1905); The Mistress Art (1908), Architectural Drawing and Draughtsmen (1912); The Touchstone of Architecture (1925); Six Architects (1925); Memoirs of an Architect (1932); the controversial anti-Modernist polemic, Modernismus (1934) and the sketchy Richard Norman Shaw (1940). In 1920 he delivered the British Academy's Aspects of Art Lecture, which was published in the Proceedings of the British Academy. A further collection of autobiographical material, 1932–42, continuing his memoirs, remains unpublished and is in the possession of his descendants.

== Archival materials ==
The British Architectural Library Drawings Collection has a number of his perspective drawings produced for Royal Academy exhibitions and an incomplete collection of his sketchbooks, photographs and papers. Other documents remain in the possession of his descendants, but he disposed of the majority of his drawings during the Second World War. A bronze bust of Blomfield by Sir William Reid Dick is in the National Portrait Gallery.

== List of works ==
The following list of major works is selected from that given in R.A. Fellows, Sir Reginald Blomfield: an Edwardian architect, 1985, with additions from The Buildings of England and other sources cited in the bibliography:

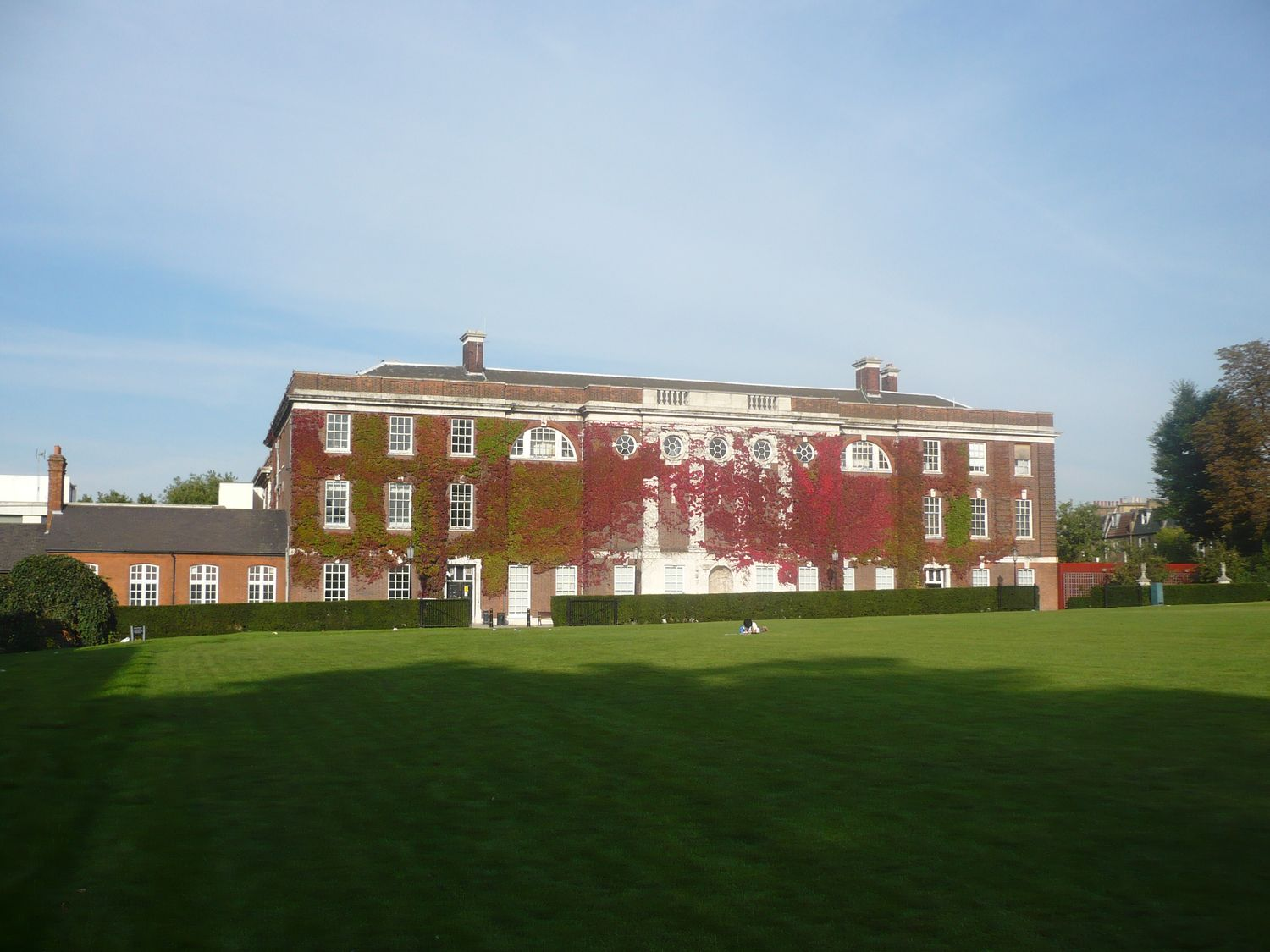
Goldsmiths College, London, 1907

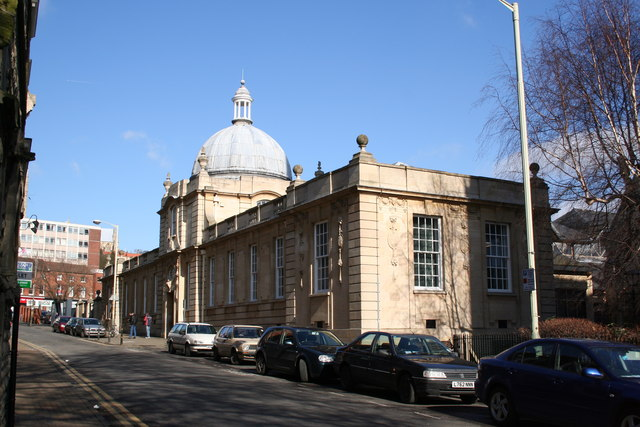
Lincoln Public Library, 1910

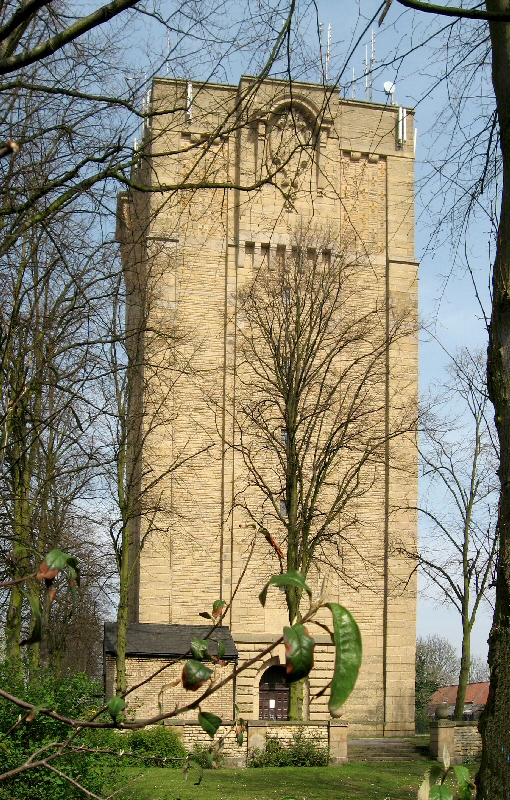
Westgate Water Tower, Lincoln, 1910

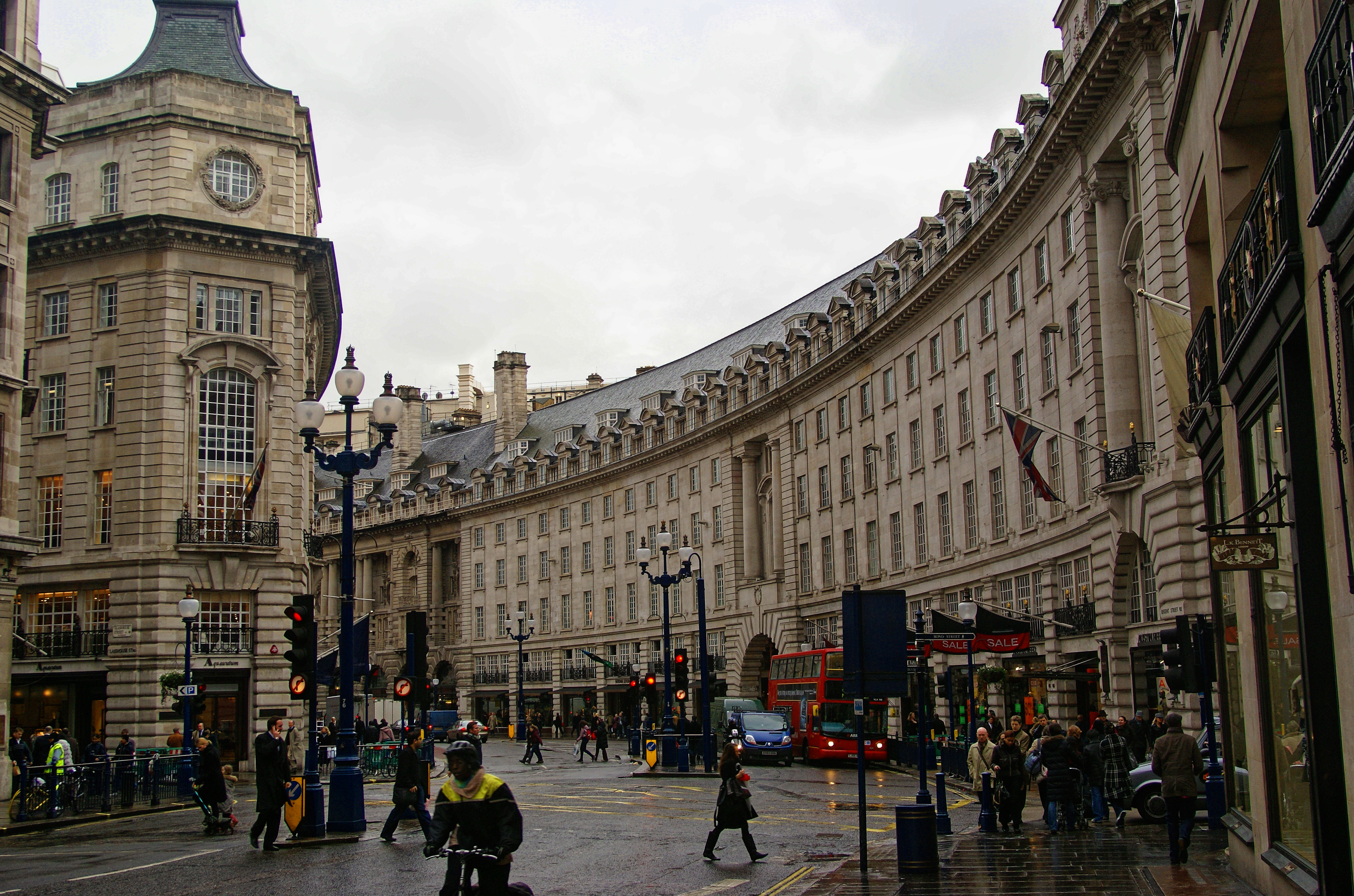
Regent Street, London, 1916–1926

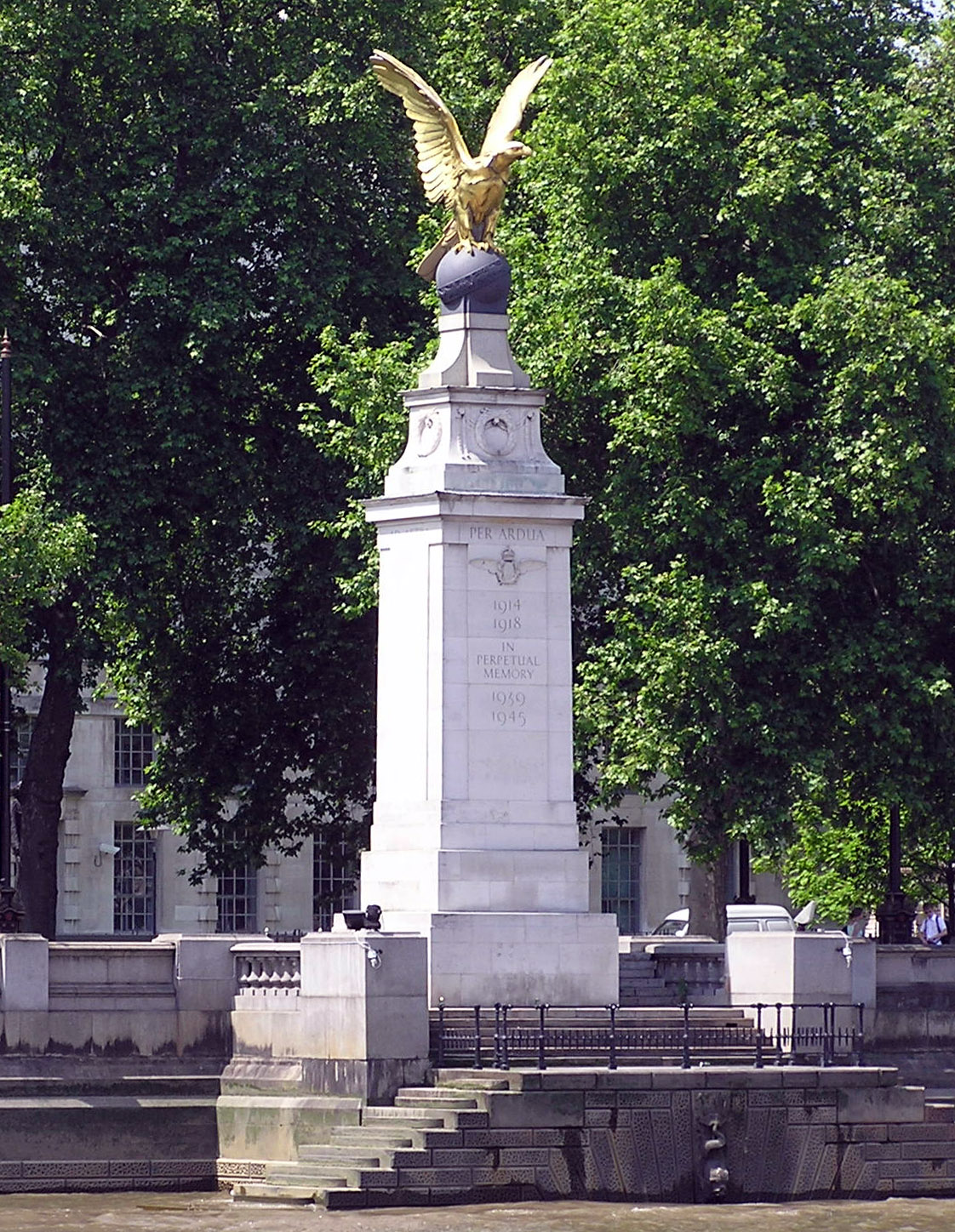
R.A.F. Memorial, London, 1921

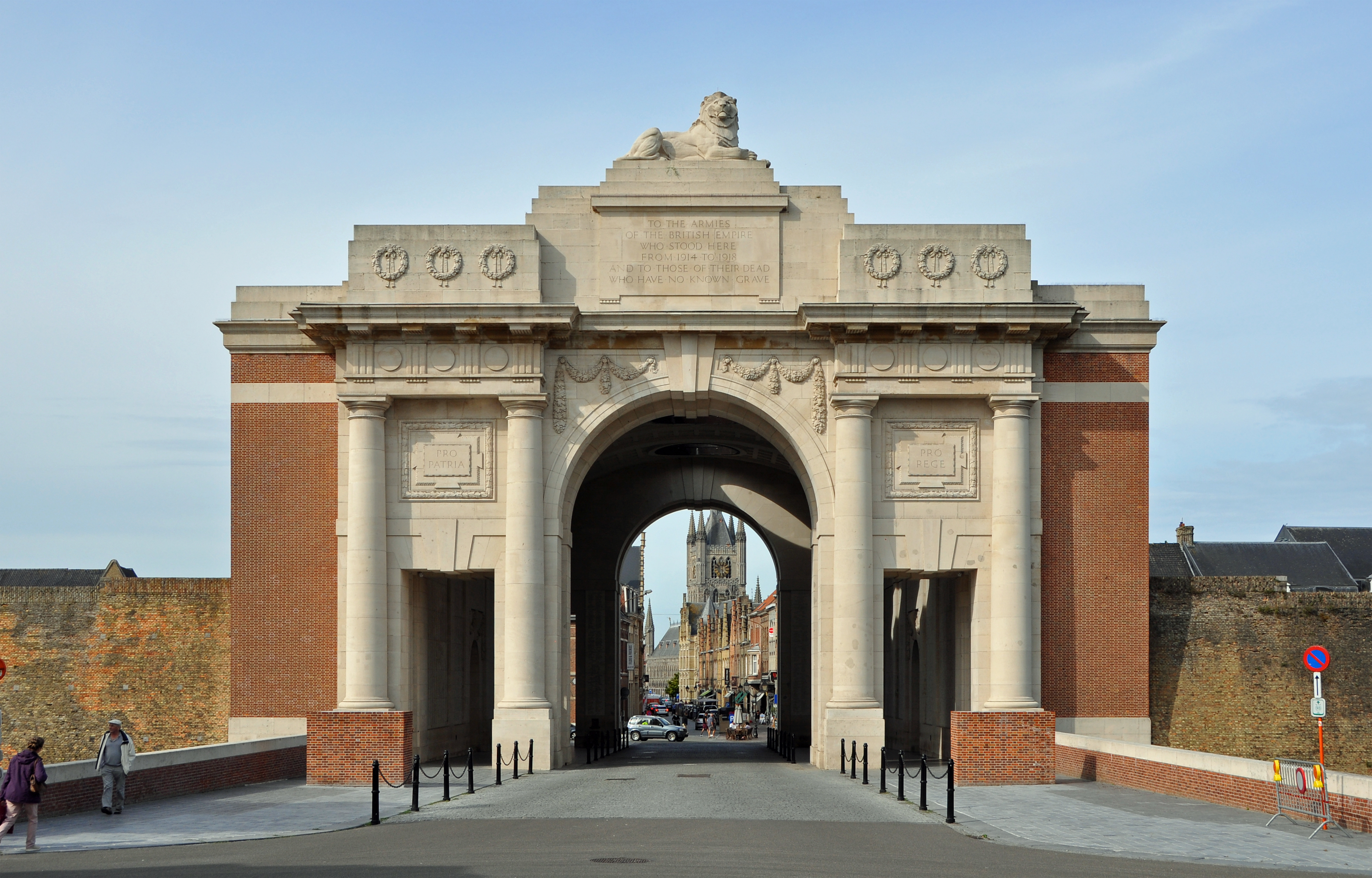
Menin Gate, Ypres, Belgium, 1922–1927

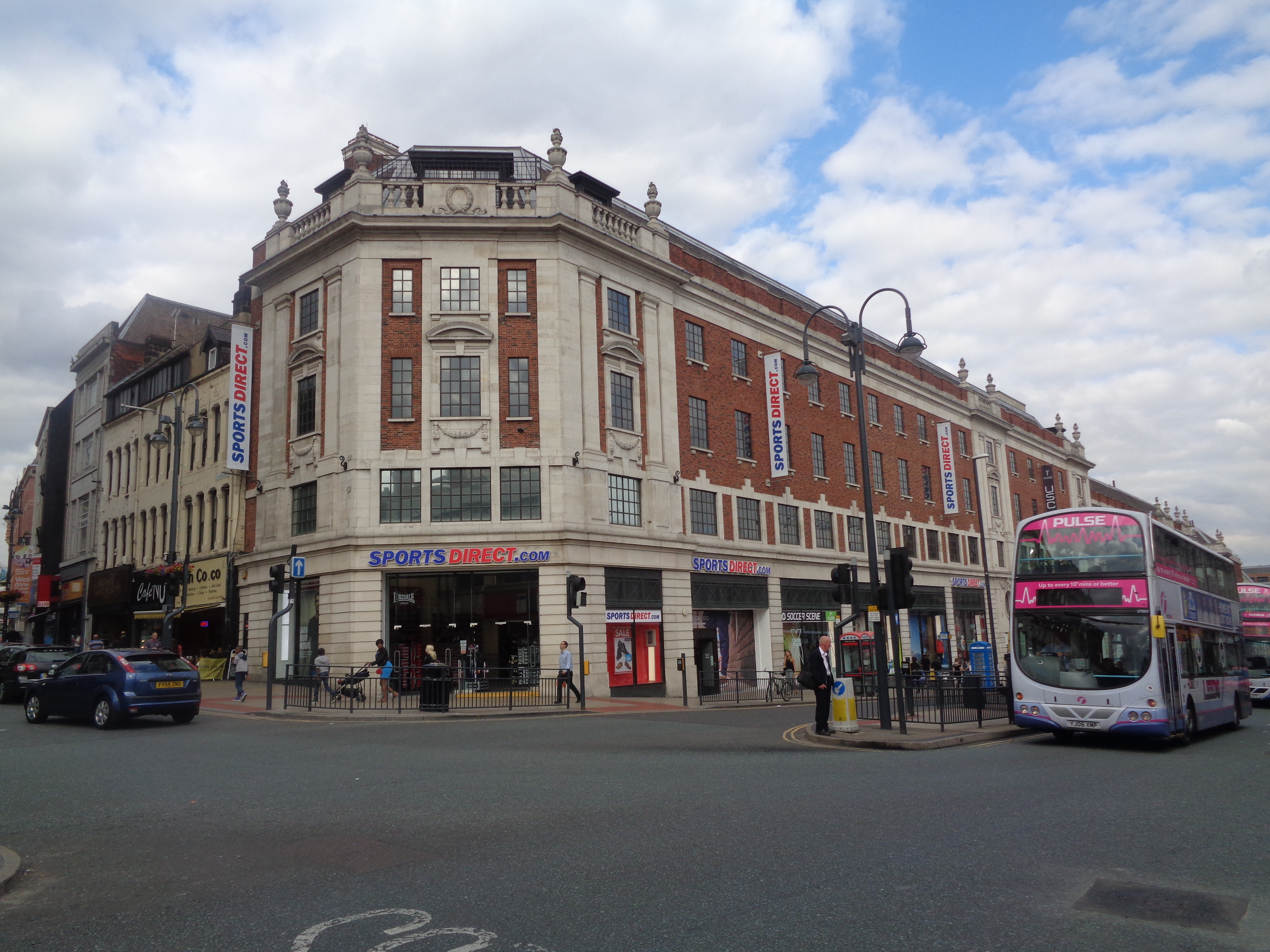
The Headrow, Leeds, 1924–1937

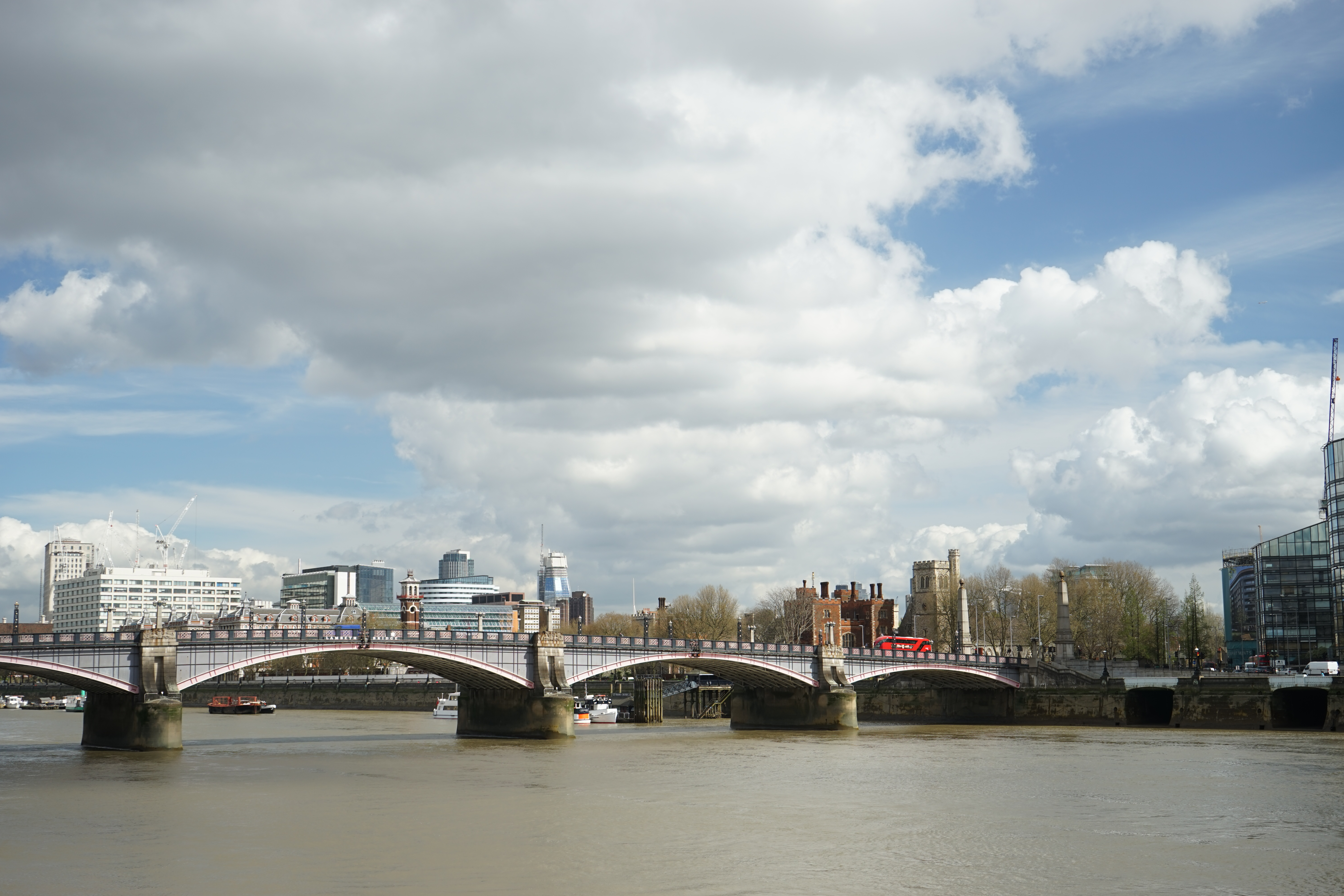
Lambeth Bridge, London,1925–1932

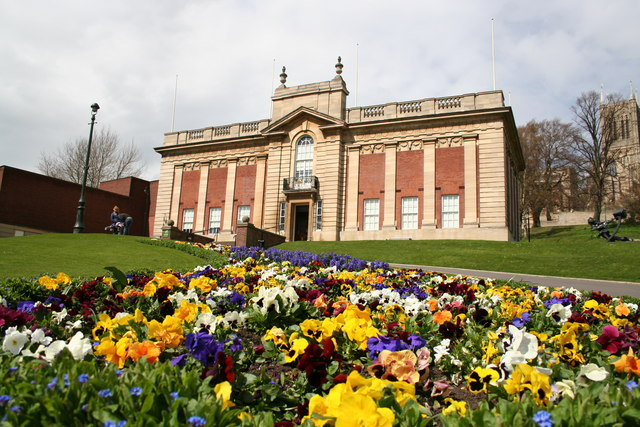
Usher Art Gallery, Lincoln, 1927

- Haileybury College, Hertfordshire: erection of Bradby Memorial Hall, 1886; Music School, Sports Pavilion and organ case, 1923
- Broxbourne, Hertfordshire: erection of five houses on St Catherine's estate for J.A. Hunt, 1887
- 20 Buckingham Gate, Westminster, Middlesex: new town house in free Queen Anne style, 1887
- Rye, Sussex: new vicarage, 1887; mission room, 1900
- Swinford Old Manor, near Ashford, Kent: restoration, 1887
- Blacknoll, Dorset: new house, 1889
- Hertford, Hertfordshire: new covered market, public library and art school, 1889 (with W.H. Wilds)
- Brooklands, Weybridge, Surrey: alterations and renovation for Arthur Brook, 1889, in free Queen Anne style
- Rye, Sussex: erection of houses in Gun Garden and Watchbell Street, 1890, 1910
- Aslockton, Nottinghamshire: new church, 1890–92
- Bern (Switzerland): rebuilding of St. Antonien Kapelle, 1891, in late Gothic style
- Carshalton, Surrey: extension of All Saints church, 1891–1914 (with A.W. Blomfield)
- Southwater, Horsham, Sussex: new house and gardens, 1891
- Chequers Court, Buckinghamshire: restoration, alterations and gardens for Bertram Astley, 1892–1901 and Arthur Lee, 1st Baron Lee of Fareham, 1909–12, in neo-Jacobean style
- Frogmore Hall, Hertfordshire: alterations, 1892
- Frognal, Hampstead, Middlesex: new houses at 49–51 Frognal for himself and T.J. Cobden Sanderson, 1892
- Swiftsden, Etchingham, Sussex: new house in neo-Georgian style, 1892
- Borrowstone Lodge, Kincardine O'Neil, Aberdeenshire: new house, 1893
- Queen Anne's School, Caversham, Oxfordshire: chapel, 1893
- St. George, Hanover Square, London: new fittings, circa 1894
- Warley Lodge, Essex: new gardens, 1894
- Mystole House. Chartham, Kent: alterations and additions, 1895, in neo-Georgian style
- Godinton Park, Kent: alterations, 1895, 1924 and new garden, circa 1902
- Greycoat Place, London: warehouse for Army and Navy Stores, 1895
- Limpsfield Chart, Surrey: St. Andrew's Church, 1895, in Arts & Crafts style
- Rye, Point Hill, expansion of cottage into new house for himself, 1895–1912
- Cowley House, Middlesex: addition and alterations, 1896
- Heathfield Park, Sussex: alterations and additions for W.C. Alexander, 1896–1910, in neo-Georgian style
- Lady Margaret Hall, Oxford: college buildings, 1896–1915
- St Edmund's School, Canterbury, Kent: headmaster's house, 1897
- Hillside School, Godalming, Surrey: school buildings and house, 1897
- Wittington House, Medmenham, Buckinghamshire: house, gardens and lodge for Hudson Kearley, 1st Lord Devonport, 1897–1904, and enlargement, 1909; in Wrenaissance style
- Mellerstain, Roxburghshire: restoration and gardens for Lord Binning, 1898–1910
- Brocklesby Hall, Lincolnshire: reconstruction after a fire, and new gardens for the Earl of Yarborough, 1898–1910 in Wrenaissance style
- Caythorpe Court, Lincolnshire: new house and gardens for Edgar Lubbock, brewer and banker, 1899–1903, in neo-Jacobean style
- Effordleigh House, near Plymouth, Devonshire: new house, 1899
- Fratton, Portsmouth, Hampshire: St Mary's Church Institute (1899–1907)
- Drakelow Hall, Derbyshire: restoration and gardens for Gresley family, 1900–06
- West Broyle, Chichester, Sussex: new house, 1901
- Yockley, Frimley, Surrey: new house and gardens for Charles Furse ARA, 1901–02 in neo-Georgian style; additional wing, 1910
- Murraythwaite, Dumfriesshire: new house, 1901
- Blundell's School, Tiverton, Devonshire: additions, 1901
- Heywood Manor, Boldre, Hampshire: new house and gardens, 1902
- Euston Hall, Suffolk: new gardens for Duke of Grafton, 1902
- Hatchlands, Surrey: new Music Room, 1902–03, in Wrenaissance style
- Sherborne School for Girls, Dorset: new buildings, 1902–26, in neo-Tudor style
- Gogmagog Hall, Cambridgeshire: alterations, 1903
- Ballard's Court, Goudhurst, Kent: new house, 1903
- Leasam House, Playden, Sussex: alterations and new gardens, 1903
- Medmenham Manor House, Buckinghamshire: restoration for Hudson Kearley, 1903
- Apethorpe Hall, Northamptonshire: alterations and additions, and new gardens, for Leonard Brassey, 1st Baron Brassey, 1904
- Knowlton Court, Kent: alterations and new gardens for Major Elmer Speed, 1904
- Oliver Whitby School Chichester (closed 1950 and became House of Fraser which closed 2019; proposal to redevelop the building into 87 flats), 1904
- St Mary's Church, Islington, Portico at west door, 1904
- Merchant Taylors' Hall, London: alterations, 1904, 1926
- Saltcote Place, Rye, Sussex: new house for Mr Hennessy, 1905 | URL=https://planweb01.rother.gov.uk/OcellaWeb/planningDetails?reference=RR/2023/2215/O&from=planningSearch/
- Kenfield Hall, Kent: additions and alterations, 1906–09
- Oxford & Cambridge Club, Pall Mall, London: alterations, including new staircase, 1906–12
- United University Club, Suffolk St., London: new building, 1906; extensions, 1924, 1938
- Wyphurst, Cranleigh, Surrey: additions for C.E.H. Chadwyck-Healey, 1907, in neo-Tudor style
- Garnons, Herefordshire: alterations, 1907, in neo-Georgian style
- Ickworth, Suffolk: remodelling of entrance hall for 4th Marquess of Bristol, 1907
- Hill House, Shenley, Hertfordshire: new gardens for S. de la Rue, 1907
- Milner Court, Sturry, Kent: additions and new gardens, 1907
- Moundsmere Manor, Hampshire: new house and gardens for Wilfred Buckley, 1908–09 in neo-Georgian style
- Roehampton, Surrey: new archive repository for Bank of England, 1908–10
- Hill Hall, Essex: alterations and additions for Mrs Charles Hunter, 1909
- London and County Bank, 114-116 King's Road, Chelsea, 1909
- Sherborne School, Dorset: Carrington Building, 1909–10; Classrooms and Gatehouse Tower on the northside of the Courts, 1913–23; War Memorial Staircase and ante-Chapel, 1922; Gymnasium, 1923; Music School, 1926
- Manoir de la Trinité, Jersey: remodelling for Athelstan Riley, 1909–12
- Sandhouse, Witley, Surrey: new house, circa 1909–11
- New Public Library, Lincoln, Lincolnshire, 1910–14, in Wrenaissance style
- Westgate Water Tower, Lincoln, Lincolnshire, 1910
- 20 Upper Grosvenor Street, London: alterations and redecoration, 1910
- Regent Street/Piccadilly, London: redevelopment of The Quadrant with new shops and stores, 1910–26
- Malma, Pyrford, Surrey: new house, 1914–1915
- Lockleys, Welwyn, Hertfordshire: alterations, additions and gardens, 1911
- Lord Wandsworth College, Hampshire: Entrance to campus, 1912
- Whiteley Village, Surrey: new houses in North Avenue, 1911
- The Lordship, Much Hadham, Hertfordshire: additions, 1912
- Wretham Hall, Norfolk: new house and gardens for Sir Saxton Noble, 1912–13, in Wrenaissance style
- Netherseal Hall, Derbyshire: restoration, 1914
- Kinnaird House, Pall Mall, London: new building, 1915 (with A.J. Driver)
- Penn House, Buckinghamshire: alterations, 1918
- Brodick Castle, Arran: restoration and new gardens, 1919
- Harefield Place, Middlesex: alterations, 1920, 1934
- Carlton Club, Pall Mall, London: extension, 1920 (destroyed in Second World War: not the current premises in St James's Street)
- Sulgrave Manor, Northamptonshire: additions and restoration, 1921
- Halstead Hall, Lincolnshire: restoration, 1922
- Barkers Department Store, High Street, Kensington, Middlesex: new department store, 1924
- The Headrow, Leeds, Yorkshire: layout of new street with shops, offices and banks, 1924–37 (with other architects)
- Lambeth Bridge, London: new bridge, 1929–32
- Ypres (Belgium): new British School building, 1925
- Stowe School, Buckinghamshire: development plan, 1926
- Usher Gallery, Lincoln, Lincolnshire: new building, 1926–27
- Chantry Bridge, Rotherham, Yorkshire: reconstruction, 1927
- Crockerhill, Sussex: alterations, 1929
- County Hall, Lewes, Sussex: rebuilding, 1928–30
- Middlesex Hospital, London: new facade, 1930
- 4 Carlton Gardens, London: new offices, 1932 (part of a scheme for the total redevelopment of Carlton House Terrace

Among war memorials for which he was responsible are:

- Brandhoek Military Commonwealth War Graves Commission Cemetery, Ypres, West Flanders, Belgium, 1915.
- Belgian War Memorial, Victoria Embankment, London, 1917, with Belgian sculptor Victor Rousseau
- Bouzincourt Ridge Cemetery, Somme, France, 1918
- Derby School War Memorial, an obelisk at St. Helen's House, Derby, 1921
- Hertfordshire Regiment Memorial, Hertford, 1921
- Ypres (Belgium): Menin Gate, 1922 and Saint George's Memorial Church, 1928
- The Royal Air Force Memorial in London, 1923.
- The Cross of Sacrifice or War Cross, for the Imperial War Graves Commission (now Commonwealth War Graves Commission). These are in Commonwealth cemeteries in many countries.
- Bury War Memorial

== Awards and honours ==
Blomfield was made an Associate of the Royal Institute of British Architects (RIBA) in 1881 and a Fellow in 1906; an Associate of the Royal Academy in 1905 and elected to the Academy in 1914, where he had been Professor of Architecture 1907–11 and awarded the Royal Gold Medal in 1913. He was President of the RIBA in 1912–14 and was knighted in 1919. In 1933, he was elected into the National Academy of Design as an Honorary Corresponding member.

== Death ==
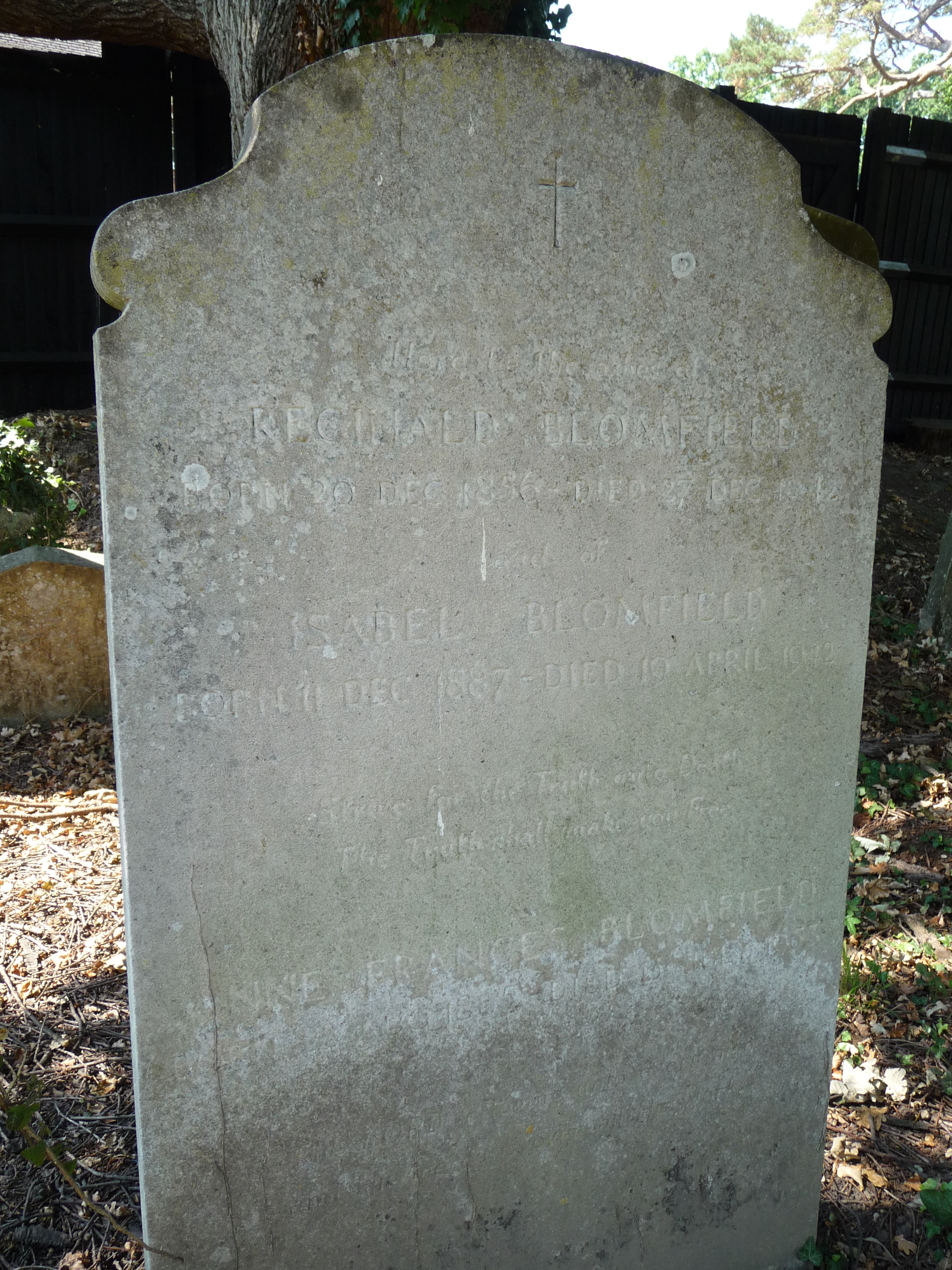
Grave of Reginald Blomfield in the churchyard of St Michael, Playden, East Sussex

He died aged 86 on 27 December 1942 and is buried in the family plot in the churchyard of St Michael, Playden, East Sussex, half a mile north of his country home Point Hill, Rye. Blomfield was predeceased by his daughter Isabel and survived by his wife and two sons, Henry George and Austin (architect). Fellow architect Horace Field, who was a near neighbour in both Rye and Hampstead, is buried in the same churchyard.

== See also ==
- St. Thomas' Church, Aslockton
