= La Brique Military Cemeteries =

CWGC cemetery in Ypres, Belgium

La Brique Military 1 and 2
- Commonwealth War Graves Commission
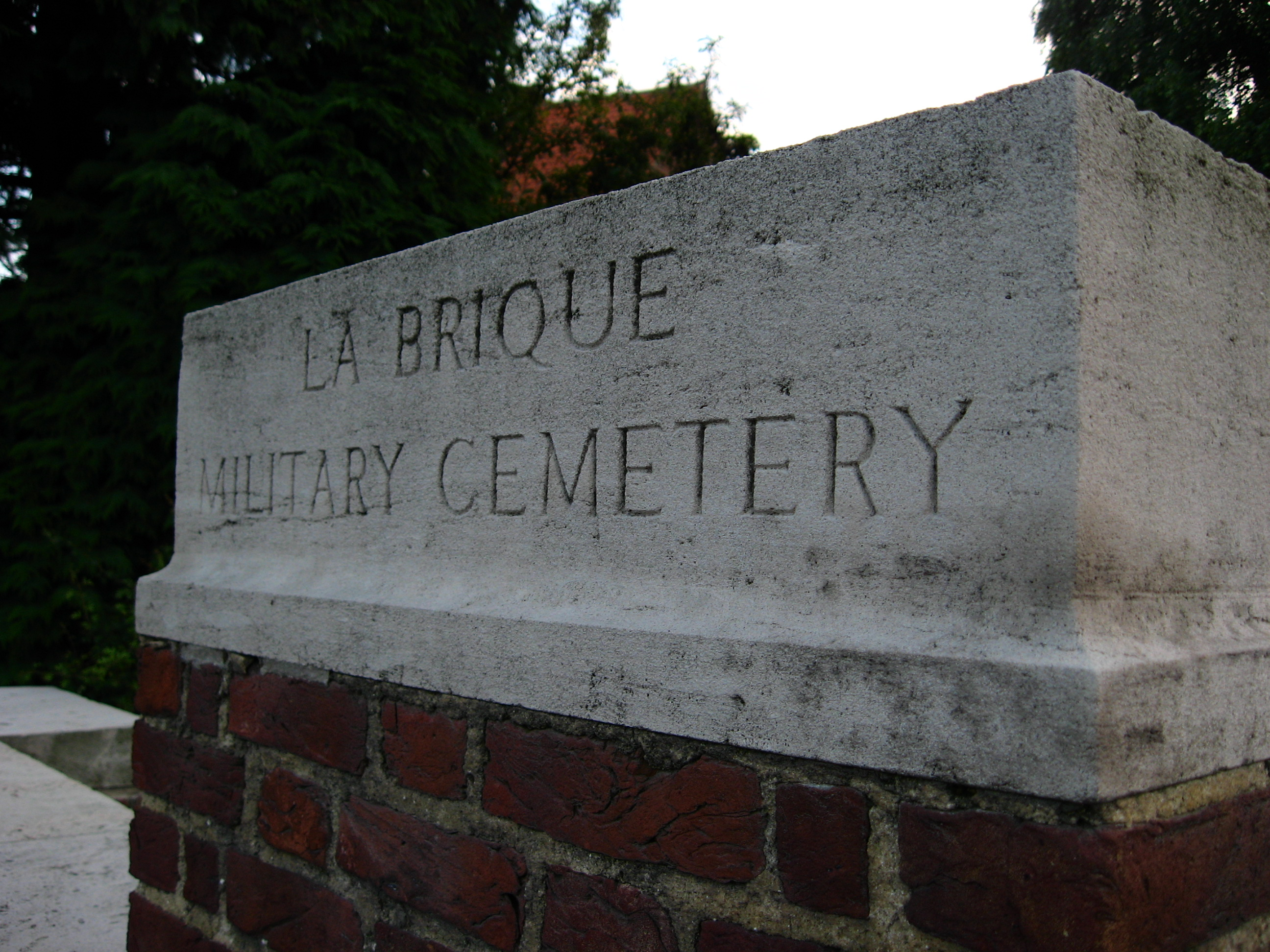
- Used for those deceased 1915 (No 1); 1915–1918 (No 2)
- Established: 1915
- Location: 50°51′53″N 02°53′38″E near Ypres, West Flanders, Belgium
- Designed by: Sir Reginald Blomfield
- Total burials: 91 (No 1); 840 (No 2)
- Unknowns: 4 (No 1); 400 (No 2)

Burials by nation
- Allied Powers: No 1 – United Kingdom 91; No 2 – United Kingdom 782; No 2 – Canada 23; No 2 – Australia 18; No 2 – New Zealand 9; No 2 – South Africa 7; No 2 – Undivided India 1

Burials by war
- World War I: 91 (No 1); 840 (No 2)
- Statistics source: WW1Cemeteries.com and CWGC

La Brique Military Cemeteries No 1 and No 2 are Commonwealth War Graves Commission (CWGC) burial grounds for the dead of the First World War located in the Ypres Salient on the Western Front.

The cemetery grounds were assigned to the United Kingdom in perpetuity by King Albert I of Belgium in recognition of the sacrifices made by the British Empire in the defence and liberation of Belgium during the war.

== Foundation ==
The cemetery, named after a now-lost brickworks near to the site, is divided in two by the main road. Cemetery No 1 was founded in May 1915 and used until December 1915. It is the smaller of the two.

Cemetery No 2 was founded in February 1915 and was used until March 1918. Originally containing 383 graves, the cemetery was expanded by concentration of graves from the battlefield after the Armistice. It now contains 840 graves. One of the graves concentrated in Cemetery No 2 was originally in the now-gone Kemmel No 2 French Cemetery.

The cemetery was designed by Sir Reginald Blomfield.

== Notable graves ==
Cemetery No 2 holds Corporal Alfred George Drake (1893–1915), who was posthumously awarded the Victoria Cross for bravery.

== See also ==
- Kemmel Number 1 French Commonwealth War Graves Commission Cemetery
