= Great Melton =

Civil parish in Norfolk, England

Coordinates: 52.60771°N 1.15237°E

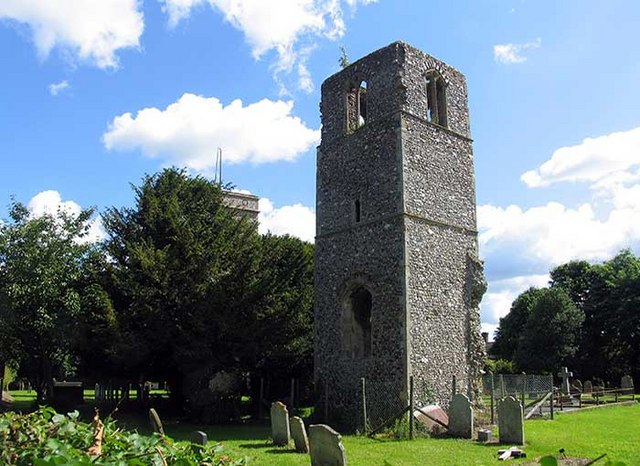
- Ruin of St Mary, Great Melton

- Location within Norfolk
- Area: 3.95 sq mi (10.2 km^{2})
- Population: 147
  - Density: 37/sq mi (14/km^{2})
- OS grid reference: TG135057
- Civil parish: Great Melton
- District: South Norfolk
- Shire county: Norfolk
- Region: East
- Country: England
- Sovereign state: United Kingdom
- Post town: NORWICH
- Postcode district: NR9
- Dialling code: 01603
- Police: Norfolk
- Fire: Norfolk
- Ambulance: East of England
- UK Parliament: South Norfolk

Great Melton is a village and civil parish in the English county of Norfolk.

Great Melton is located 9.4 miles (15.1 km) south-east of Dereham and 6.3 miles (10.1 km) west of Norwich.

== History ==
Two hoards of Roman coins have been discovered in Great Melton amounting to around 300 coins in total.

Great Melton's name is of Anglo-Saxon origin and derives from the Old English for the large middle farm/settlement.

In the Domesday Book, Great Melton is listed as a settlement of 79 households in the hundred of Humbleyard. In 1086, the village was divided between the estates of Godric the Steward and Ranulf Peverel.

In the eighteenth century, Melton Hall was built. Some of the original buildings remain but most of the grounds have reverted to agricultural use.

A field within Great Melton, upon which the old Norwich Road ran, is reputed to be haunted by a carriage-drawn bridal party, driven by a headless carriage driver, which fell into a roadside pool. Similar stories are told about a similar field near Bury St Edmunds and another near Leigh, Dorset.

== Geography ==
According to the 2021 census, Great Melton has a total population of 147 people which demonstrates a decrease from the 163 people listed in the 2011 census.

The confluence of the River Yare and River Tiffey is located within the parish.

== All Saints' Church ==
Great Melton's parish church is located outside of the village on Market Lane and dates from the Eleventh Century. All Saints' is no longer open for Sunday services.

The churchyard contains the ruined tower of St. Mary's Church which was demolished to enlarge All Saints' in the 1880s by the architect, Joseph Pearce. All Saints' features stained-glass windows depicting Saint Fursey by Goddard & Gibbs and Saint Walstan by Horace Wilkinson.

== Governance ==
Great Melton is part of the electoral ward of Easton for local elections and is part of the district of South Norfolk.

The village's national constituency is South Norfolk which has been represented by the Labour's Ben Goldsborough MP since 2024.

== War Memorial ==
Great Melton War Memorial is located at the end of Great Melton Park and is a stone greensward. The memorial was unveiled in 1920 in a service led by Major Edward Evans-Lombe, the principal landowner in Great Melton, and Rector Major Hadow. The memorial lists the following names for the First World War:

Rank	Name	Unit	Date of death	Burial/Commemoration
Brig.	Charles Gosling CMG	10th Bde., 4th Infantry Division	12 Apr. 1917	Hervin Farm Cemetery
Capt.	Anthony H. E. Ashley (Note: Captain Ashley was wounded at Ypres in 1916 and, subsequently, died of his wounds in 1920.)	Coldstream Guards	6 Mar. 1920	Unknown
Capt.	Maurice H. Helyar	4th Bn., Rifle Brigade	24 Jan. 1915	Bailleul Cemetery
Lt.	Francis W. T. Clerke	2nd Bn., Coldstream Guards	26 Sep. 1916	Guards Cemetery
LCpl.	Arthur T. Fox	1st Bn., Norfolk Regiment	21 Sep. 1915	Citadel Military Cemetery
Gnr.	James Watson	Royal Garrison Artillery	3 May 1917	Athies Cemetery
Pte.	Arthur Woodrow	6th Bn., Bedfordshire Regiment	15 Jul. 1916	Pozières Memorial
Pte.	Herbert J. Morter	2nd Bn., Essex Regiment	28 Mar. 1918	Arras Memorial
Pte.	William G. Drury	2/6th Bn., Lancashire Fusiliers	19 Jan. 1918	Tyne Cot
Pte.	Charles E. Reynolds	50th Coy., Machine Gun Corps	7 Jul. 1916	Thiepval Memorial
Pte.	Donald J. Ketteringham	3rd Bn., Middlesex Regiment	27 Jul. 1915	R.E. Farm Cemetery
Pte.	Arthur J. Morter	1st Bn., Norfolk Regiment	15 Jun. 1915	Sanctuary Wood Cemetery
Pte.	Frederick R. Bales	7th Bn., Norfolk Regt.	13 Oct. 1915	Loos Memorial
Pte.	William T. Betts	7th Bn., Norfolk Regt.	13 Oct. 1915	Loos Memorial
Pte.	Thomas E. Broome	8th Bn., Norfolk Regt.	12 May 1917	Arras Memorial
Pte.	Edward Betts	9th Bn., Norfolk Regt.	15 Sep. 1916	Thiepval Memorial

The following names were added after the Second World War:

Rank	Name	Unit	Date of death	Burial/Commemoration
LSgt.	Harold W. Stone	9th Bn., Royal Norfolk Regiment	9 Jun. 1943	Berlin War Cemetery
Cpl.	Leslie J. Wright	4th Bn., Royal Tank Regiment	2 Feb. 1944	Cassino War Cemetery
Dvr.	Arthur W. Gooch	Royal Army Service Corps	31 May 1940	De Panne Cemetery
Pte.	Herbert T. Attewell	6th Bn., Royal Norfolk Regiment	2 Aug. 1943	Kanchanaburi War Cemetery
