= Suffolk Cemetery =

WWI CWGC cemetery in Ypres, Belgium

Suffolk
- Commonwealth War Graves Commission
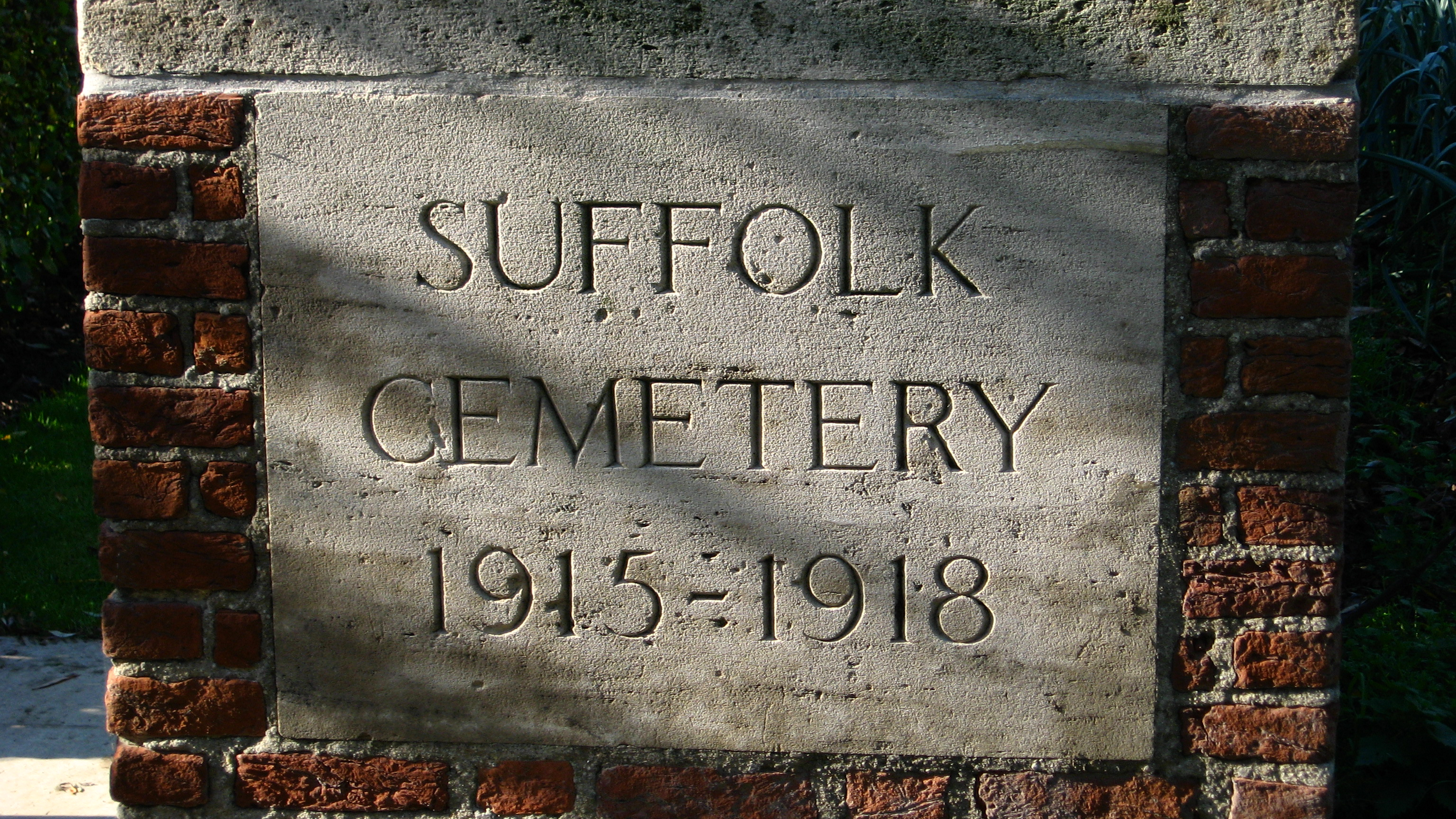
- Used for those deceased 1915–1918
- Established: 1915
- Location: 50°48′13″N 02°50′39″E near Heuvelland, West Flanders, Belgium
- Designed by: J R Truelove
- Total burials: 47
- Unknowns: 8

Burials by nation
- Allied Powers: United Kingdom 47

Burials by war
- World War I: 47
- Statistics source: WW1Cemeteries.com and CWGC

Suffolk Cemetery is a Commonwealth War Graves Commission (CWGC) burial ground for the dead of the First World War located in Kemmel in the Ypres Salient on the Western Front.

The cemetery grounds were assigned to the United Kingdom in perpetuity by King Albert I of Belgium in recognition of the sacrifices made by the British Empire in the defence and liberation of Belgium during the war.

== Foundation ==
The cemetery was founded by Commonwealth troops in March and April 1915. It was then disused, except for one 1917 burial, until October 1918.

The cemetery was founded under the name "Cheapside Cemetery" by the Suffolk Regiment. The October 1918 burials were of soldiers from the York and Lancaster Regiment who had been killed the previous April.

The cemetery was designed by J R Truelove who also worked on the Tyne Cot memorial to the missing.
