= Alfred George Drake =

Recipient of the Victoria Cross

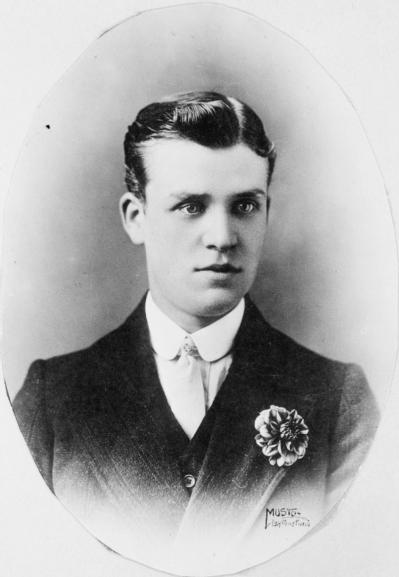
- Born: 10 December 1893; Stepney, London
- Died: 23 November 1915 (aged 21); La Brique, Belgium
- Burial place: La Brique Military Cemetery No.2, Ypres
- Military career
- Allegiance: United Kingdom
- Branch: British Army
- Service years: -1915 †
- Rank: Corporal
- Units: The Rifle Brigade
- Conflicts: World War I
- Awards: Victoria Cross

Alfred George Drake VC (10 December 1893 – 23 November 1915) was an English recipient of the Victoria Cross, the highest and most prestigious award for gallantry in the face of the enemy that can be awarded to British and Commonwealth forces.

Drake was born in Mile End, Stepney, London to Robert and Mary Ann Drake. He was 21 years old, and a corporal in the 8th Battalion, The Rifle Brigade (Prince Consort's Own), British Army during the First World War, and was awarded the VC for his actions on 23 November 1915, near La Brique in the Ypres salient, Belgium. He was killed in his VC action.

== Citation ==
For most conspicuous bravery on the night of 23rd Nov., 1915, near La Brique, France. He was one of a patrol of four which was reconnoitring towards the German lines. The patrol was discovered when close to the enemy who opened heavy fire with rifles and a machine gun, wounding the Officer and one man. The latter was carried back by the last remaining man. Corporal Drake remained with his Officer and was last seen kneeling beside him and bandaging his wounds regardless of the enemy's fire. Later a rescue party crawling near the German lines found the Officer and Corporal, the former unconscious but alive and bandaged, Corporal Drake beside him dead and riddled with bullets. He had given his own life and saved his Officer.

The London Gazette No. 29447, 21 January 1916

He was interred in La Brique Military Cemetery No, 2 near Ypres.

His VC is on display in the Lord Ashcroft Gallery at the Imperial War Museum, London.

The officer rescued by Corporal Drake was Lieutenant Henry Tryon, also of the Rifle Brigade. After Tryon recovered from his wounds, he returned to his former unit and was killed in action at Flers-Courcelette on 15 September 1916.

== Legacy ==
A mirrored memorial sculpture to Alfred George Drake has been installed at Ben Jonson Primary School, Stepney, in his memory. There is also a stone memorial plaque to him in nearby Shandy Park.

== Bibliography ==
- Batchelor, Peter; Matson, Christopher (2011). The Western Front 1915. VCs of the First World War. The History Press. ISBN 978-0-7524-6057-4.
- Oldfield, Paul (2015). Victoria Crosses on the Western Front, April 1915–June 1916. Pen and Sword Books. ISBN 978-1783030439.
