= Loker =

- Deelgemeente
- Coordinates: 50°46′53″N 2°46′25″E
- Country: Belgium
- Province: West Flanders
- Municipality: Heuvelland

Area
  - Total: 6.80 km^{2} (2.63 sq mi)

Population (2001)
  - Total: 572
- Source: NIS
- Postal code: 8958

Loker (also spelt Locre) is a small village in the Belgian province of West Flanders, and a part ("deelgemeente") of the municipality of Heuvelland.

For the major part of World War I, the city was controlled by the Allied Powers. A field hospital was located there and multiple war graves can also be found.

== Gallery ==
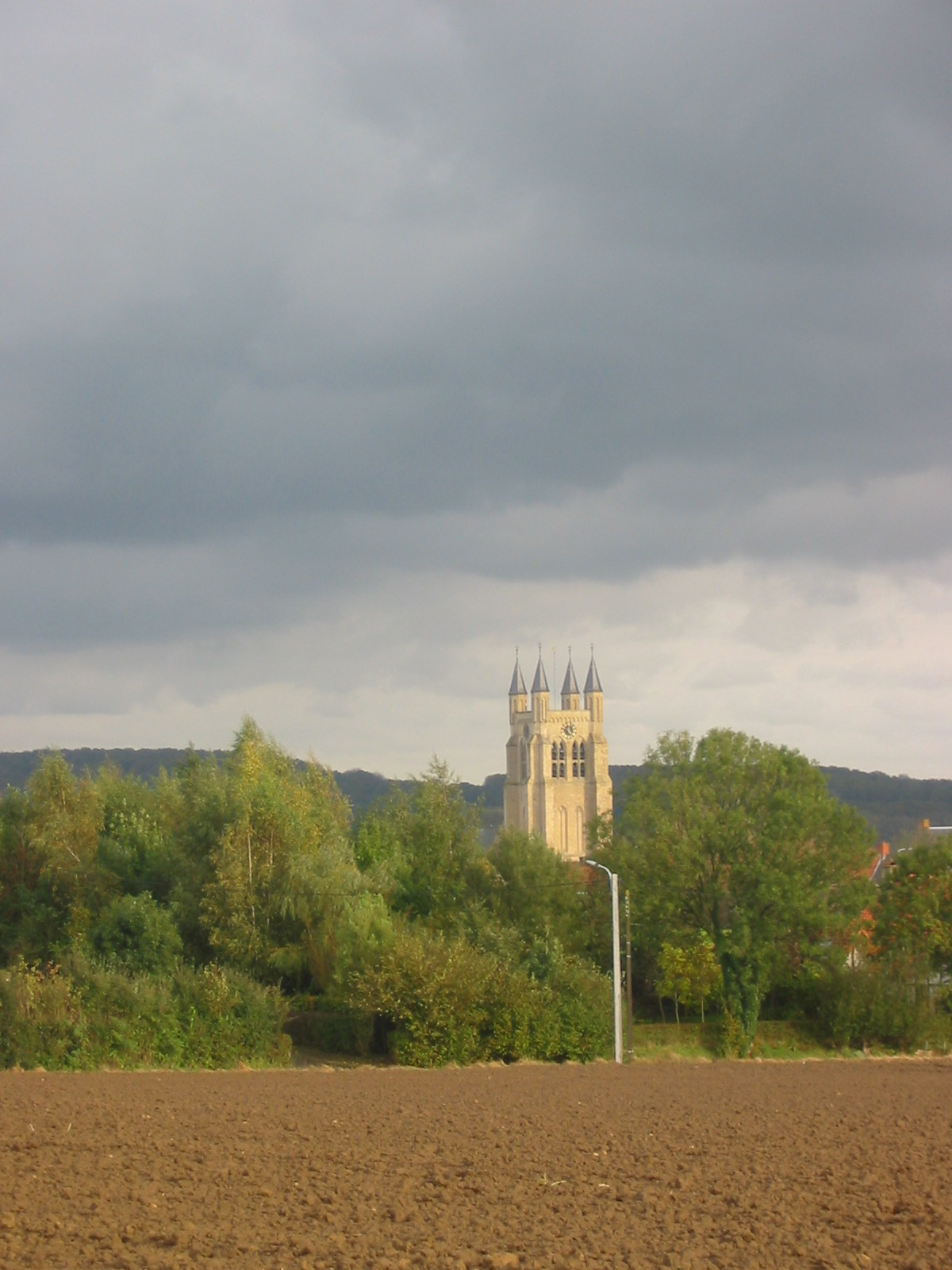
Saint Peter Church

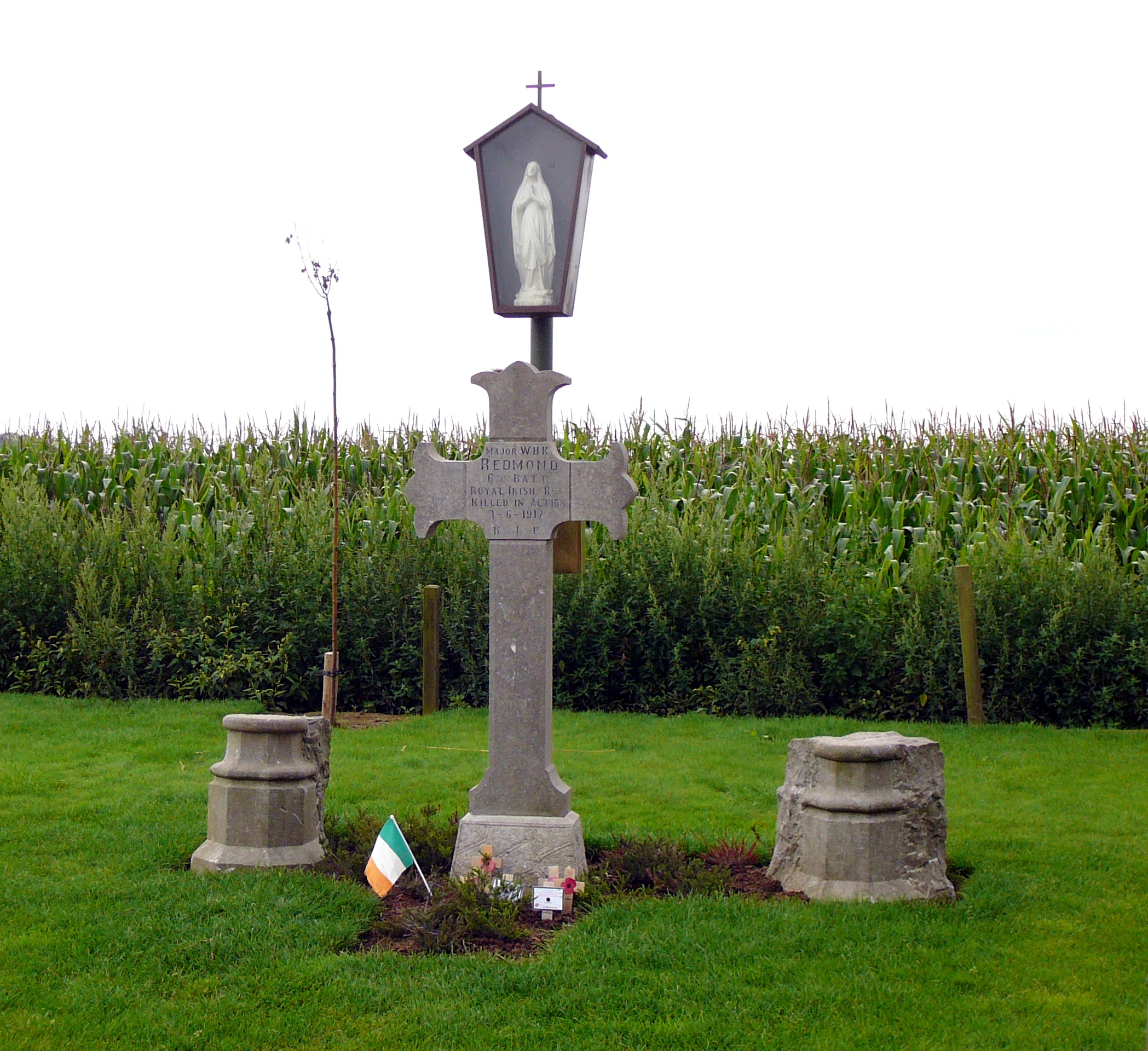
Grave of Major Willie Redmond, killed during the Battle of Messines (1917)

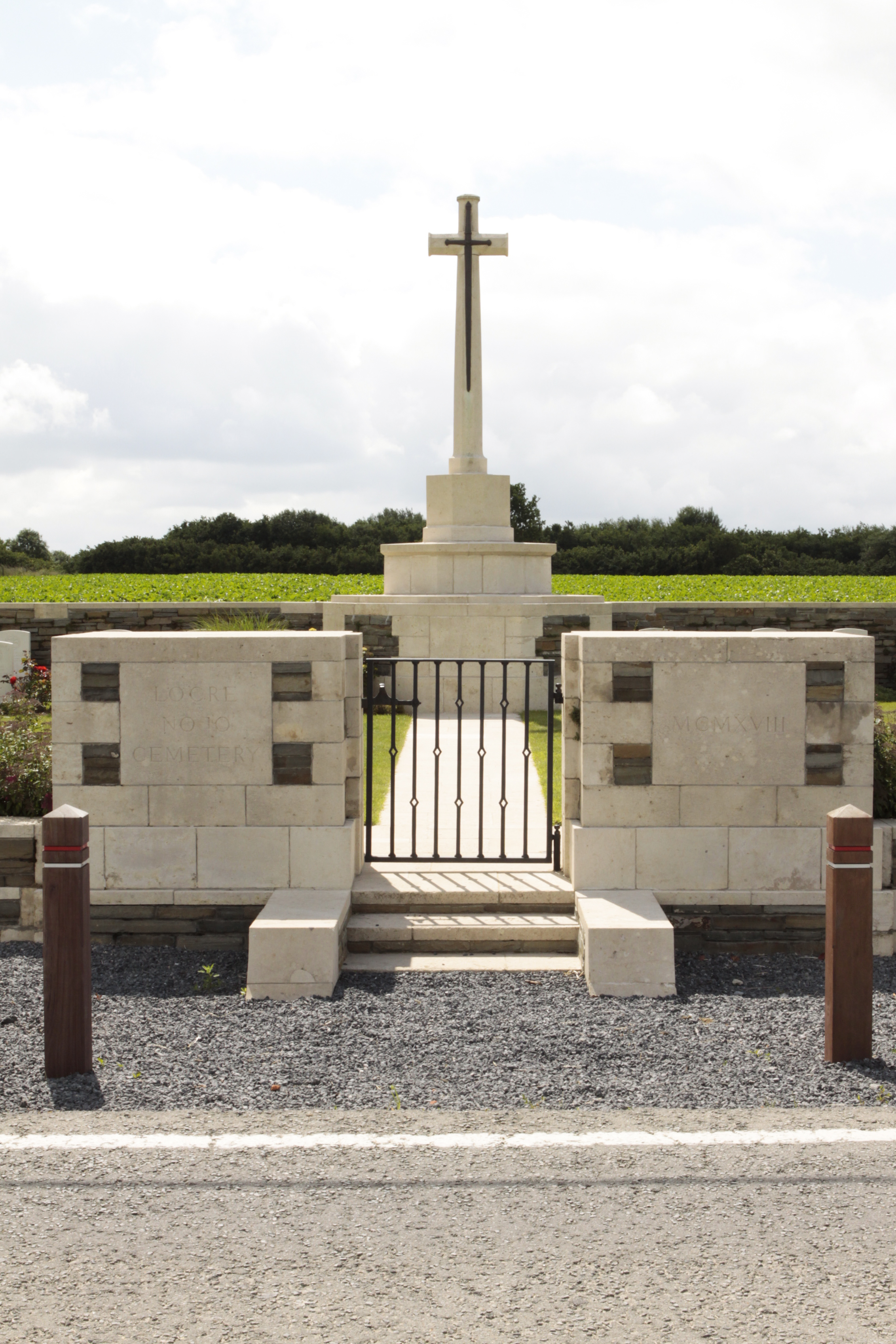
Entrance to the Locre No.10 Cemetery
