= Heuvelland =

- Municipality
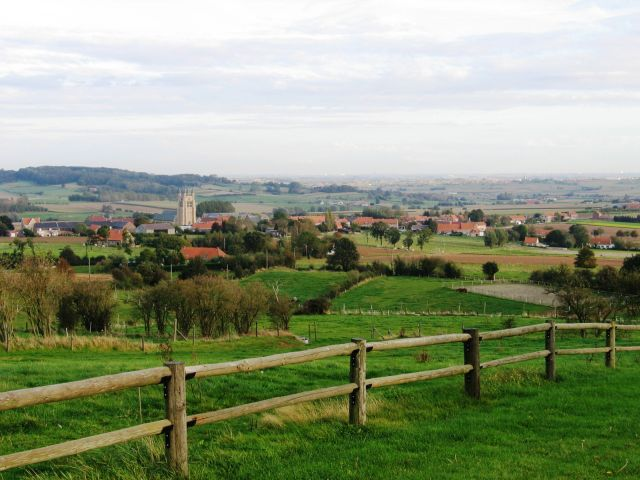

- Flag Coat of arms

- Location of Heuvelland in West Flanders
- Interactive map of Heuvelland
- Location in Belgium
- Coordinates: 50°46′N 02°49′E
- Country: Belgium
- Community: Flemish Community
- Region: Flemish Region
- Province: West Flanders
- Arrondissement: Ypres

Government
  - Mayor: Wieland De Meyer (GB)
  - Governing party: Gemeentebelangen (GB)

Area
  - Total: 94.79 km^{2} (36.60 sq mi)

Population (2018-01-01)
  - Total: 7,862
  - Density: 82.94/km^{2} (214.8/sq mi)
- Postal codes: 8950-8954, 8956, 8958
- NIS code: 33039
- Area codes: 057
- Website: www.heuvelland.be

Heuvelland (Dutch pronunciation: [ˈɦøːvəlɑnt]) is a municipality located in the Belgian province of West Flanders. The municipality comprises the villages of Dranouter, Kemmel, De Klijte, Loker, Nieuwkerke, Westouter, Wijtschate and Wulvergem. Heuvelland is a thinly populated rural municipality, located between the small urban centres of Ypres and Poperinge and the metropolitan area of Kortrijk-Lille along the E17. On 1 January 2006 Heuvelland had a total population of 8,217. The total area is 94.24 km^{2} which gives a population density of 87 inhabitants per km^{2}. The name heuvelland is Dutch meaning "hill country", as the municipality is characterized by the different hills on its territory.

== Geography ==
=== Landscape ===
The municipality is located in an area known as the West-Flemish Hills. The highest hill in Heuvelland is the Kemmelberg (154 m); followed by the Vidaigneberg (136 m), the Rodeberg (129 m), the Scherpenberg (125 m) and a lower hill in Wijtschate (82 m). On the border with France is the Zwarteberg.

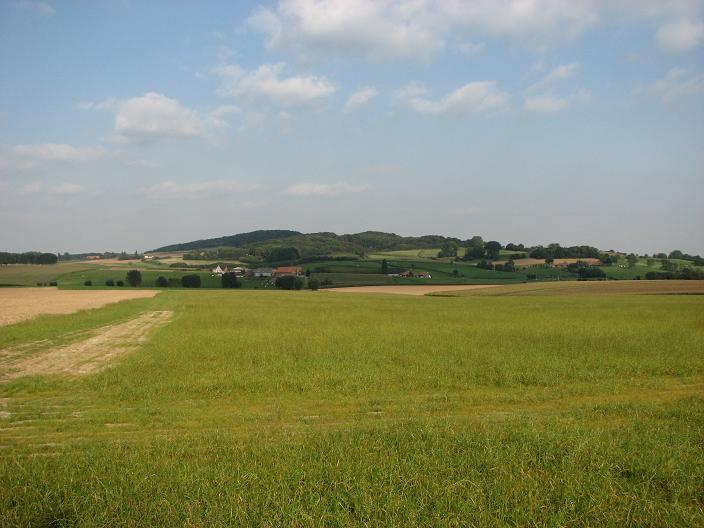
Kemmelberg, seen from the west

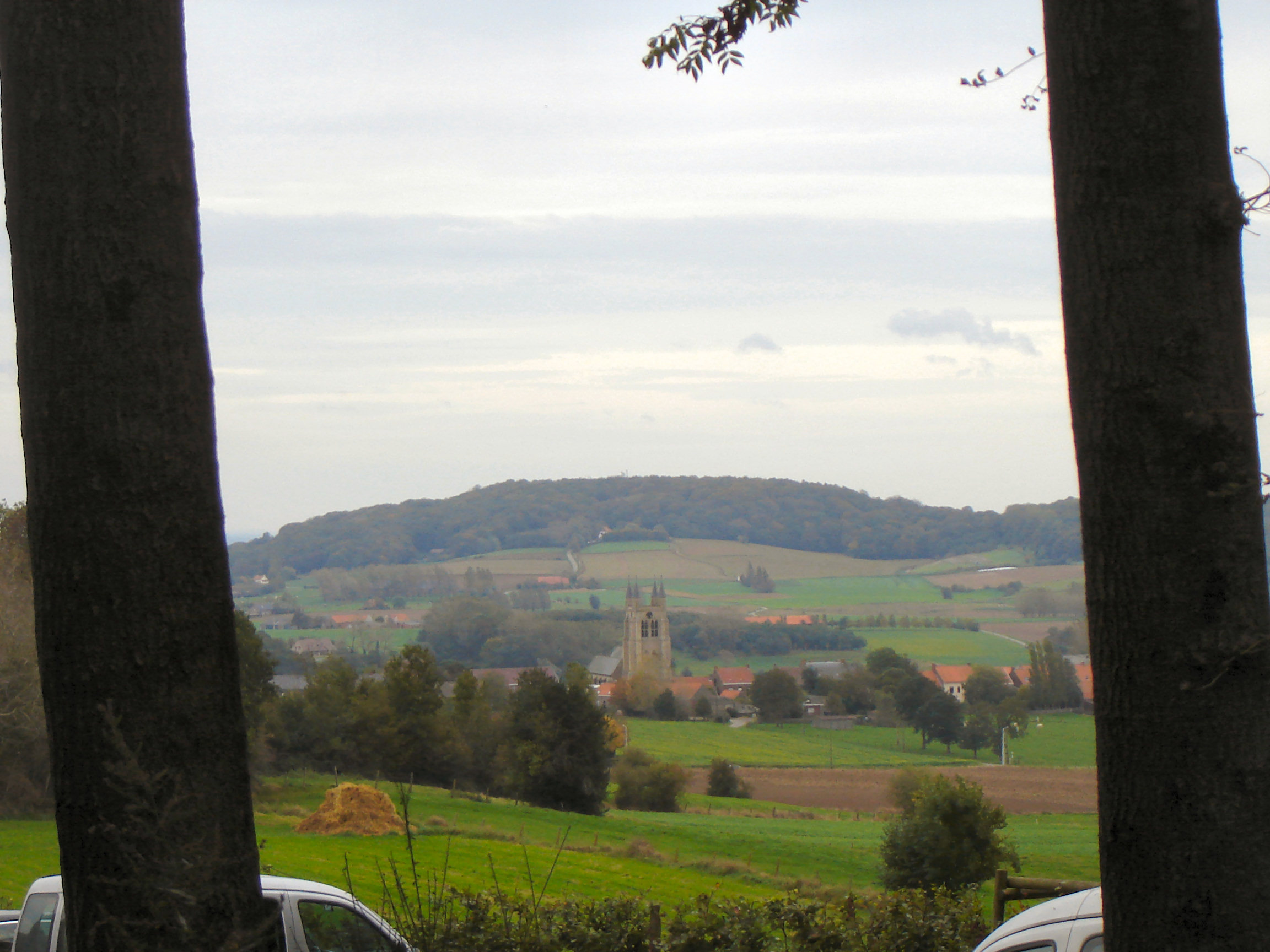
Landscape, with the village of Loker, as seen from the Rodeberg

Heuvelland, "deelgemeenten" and neighbouring villages. The yellow areas are urban areas.

=== Municipality parts ===
The municipality Heuvelland consists of eight small rural villages. The "deelgemeentes" of Dranouter, Kemmel, Loker, Nieuwkerke, Westouter, Wijtschate and Wulvergem were independent municipalities before the merger in 1977. De Klijte wasn't independent, but was a part of Reningelst (then independent, now part of Poperinge).

Kemmel, Wijtschate, Nieuwkerke and Westouter are the largest centres, with more than 1000 inhabitants each. The town hall and municipal administration are located in Kemmel, as are the police office and post office. The rest home, municipal sports hall and main library are located in Wijtschate. The municipal container park is found in Nieuwkerke. The four other villages are smaller and accommodate less facilities.

Besides the village centres, a number of smaller residential areas are scattered on the territory. On top of the crest of the Rodeberg and Zwarteberg small residential development, mixed with small shops, tourist businesses and restaurants are found. The city centre of Mesen also expands a little on the territory of Wijtschate in Heuvelland.

#	Name	Area (km^{2})	Population (2001)
I	Kemmel	12,99	1.170
II	Wijtschate	26,24	2.109
III	Wulvergem	3,50	264
IV	Nieuwkerke	17,49	1.513
V	Dranouter	10,73	703
VI	Loker	6,80	572
VII	Westouter	11,64	1.422
VIII	De Klijte	4,93	576

Source: Ruimtelijk structuurplan Heuvelland

=== Neighbouring villages and towns ===
Because of its relative extensiveness, the municipality of Heuvelland borders a large number of villages and towns:

- a. Poperinge (city of Poperinge)
- b. Reningelst (city of Poperinge)
- c. Dikkebus (city of Ypres)
- d. Vlamertinge (city of Ypres)
- e. Voormezele (city of Ypres)
- f. Hollebeke (city of Ypres)
- g. Houthem (city of Comines-Warneton)
- h. Bas-Warneton (city of Comines-Warneton)
- i. Warneton (city of Comines-Warneton)
- j. Mesen (city of Mesen)
- k. Ploegsteert (city of Comines-Warneton)
- l. Nieppe (France)
- m. Bailleul (France)
- n. Saint-Jans-Cappel (France)
- o. Boeschepe (France)

== History ==
=== World War I ===
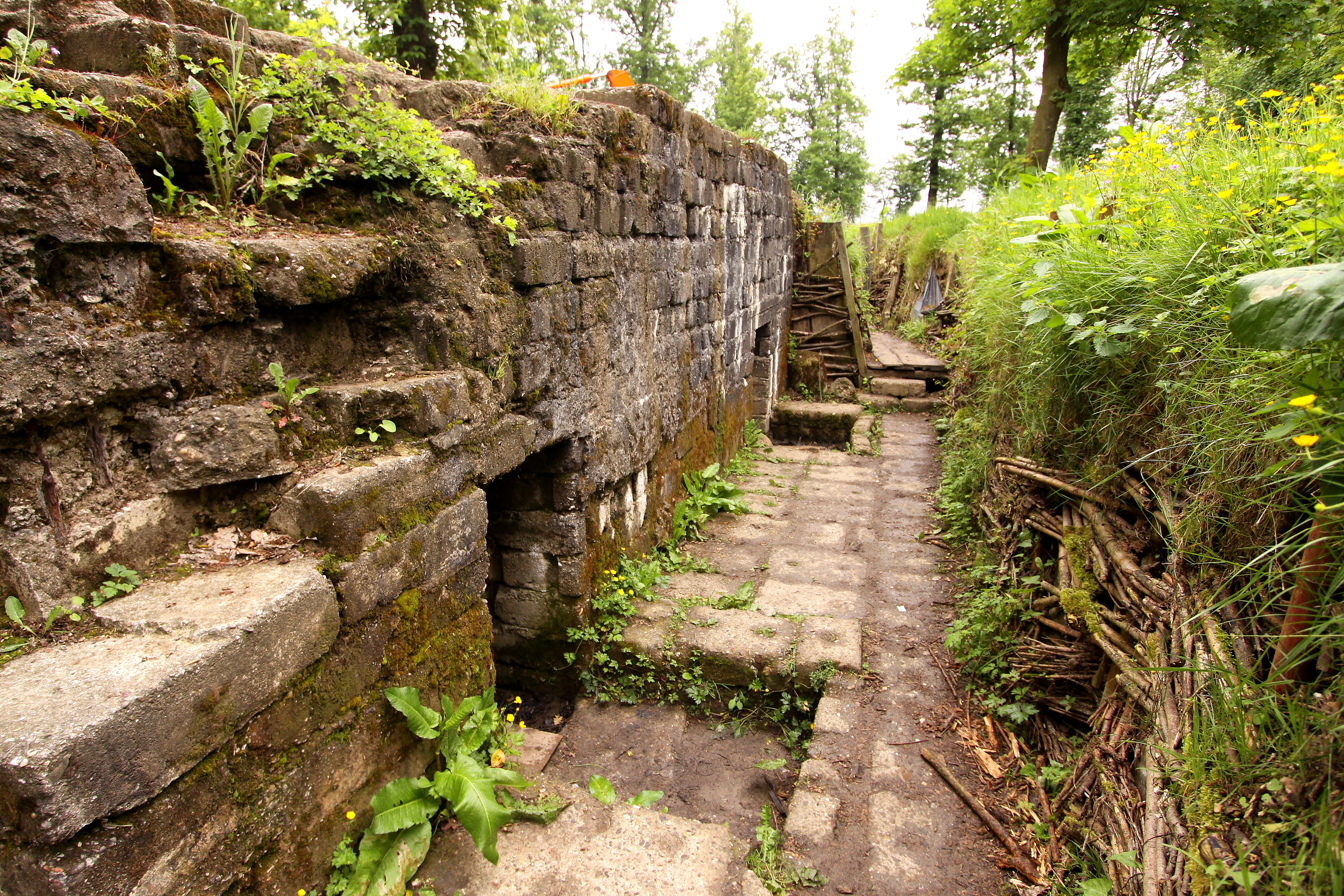
German concrete bunker at the Bayernwald Trenches in Croonaert Wood

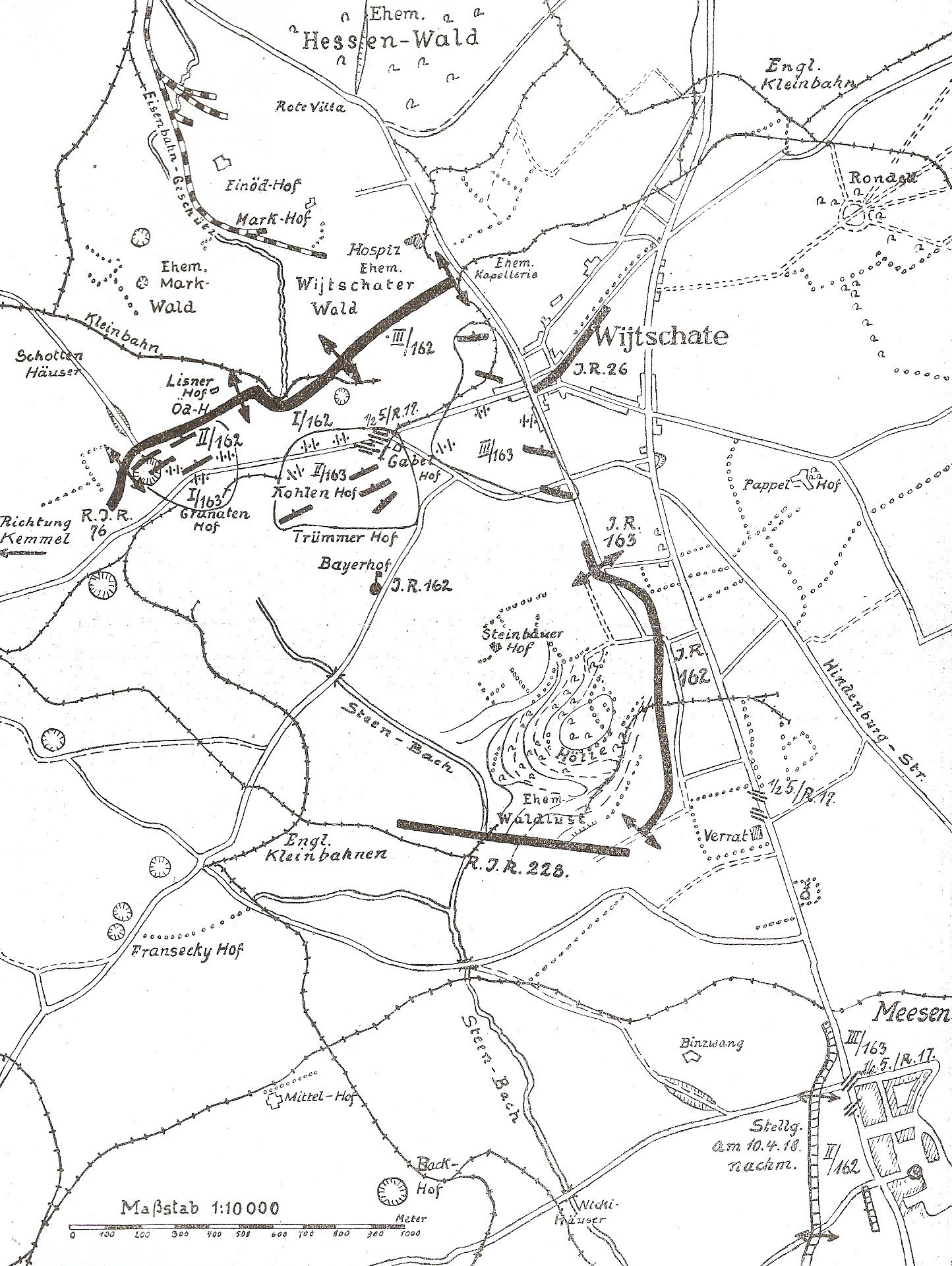
11 April 1918 during the Fight of the Kemmel as part of the German spring offensive

The area experienced many major battles during World War I, as part of the Ypres Salient area. The front-line ran through the area of Wytschaete, which was captured and held several times by both sides during the course of the war. Spanbroekmolen was an important German stronghold, and on 30 April and 17 June 1916, the area was the site of two German gas attacks on British troops at Wulverghem. The Kemmelberg was important during the Battle of the Lys, and German units maintained a trench system (Bayernwald) within view of Ypres at Croonaert Wood. Nowadays, the Bayernwald trenches can be visited as an open-air museum. There are a number of war cemeteries in the municipality, including Godezonne Farm, RE Farm, Spanbroekmolen, Suffolk, Klein Vierstraat and Kemmel Number 1 French Cemetery.

== Notable people ==
- The cartographer and astronomer Petrus Plancius was born in Dranouter in 1552.
- Singer Geike Arnaert of Hooverphonic was born and raised in Westouter.
- Tiny Legs Tim (1978-2022) - musician and singer-songwriter
