= Godezonne Farm Commonwealth War Graves Commission Cemetery =

Godezonne Farm
- Commonwealth War Graves Commission
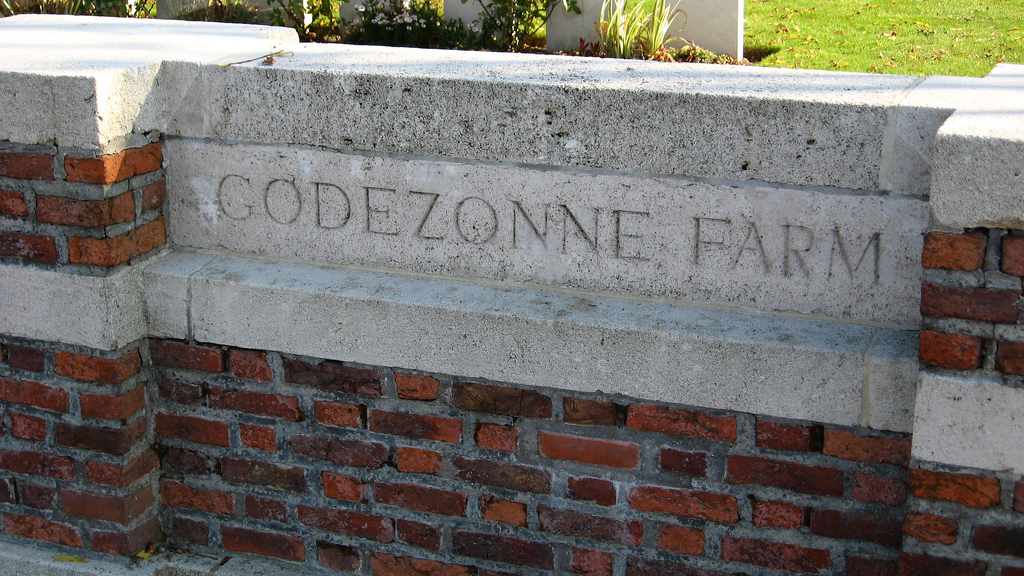
- Used for those deceased 1915–1918
- Established: 1915
- Location: 50°48′01″N 02°50′28″E near Heuvelland, West Flanders, Belgium
- Designed by: W H Cowlishaw
- Total burials: 79
- Unknowns: 44

Burials by nation
- Allied Powers: United Kingdom 74; South Africa 3; Australia 1; Canada 1

Burials by war
- World War I: 79
- Statistics source: WW1Cemeteries.com and CWGC

Godezonne Farm Cemetery is a Commonwealth War Graves Commission (CWGC) burial ground for the dead of the First World War located in the Ypres Salient on the Western Front in Belgium.

The cemetery grounds were assigned to the United Kingdom in perpetuity by King Albert I of Belgium in recognition of the sacrifices made by the British Empire in the defence and liberation of Belgium during the war.

== Foundation ==
The cemetery was founded in February 1915 by the Royal Scots and Middlesex Regiments in the garden of the original Godezonne Farm.

It was used again in 1916 for three more burials and again after the Armistice to concentrate battlefield burials from the north and the east.

The cemetery was designed by William Harrison Cowlishaw.
