= Kemmelberg =

Hill in Heuvelland, Belgium

Coordinates: 50°46′59.98″N 2°48′59.92″E

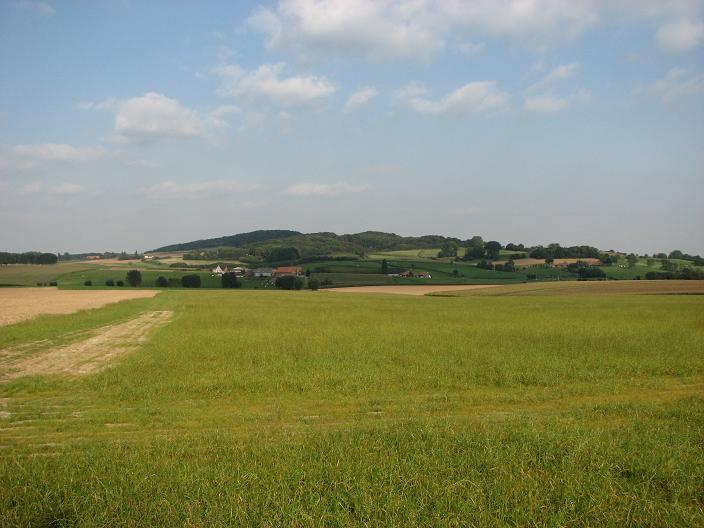
The Kemmelberg, as seen from the west

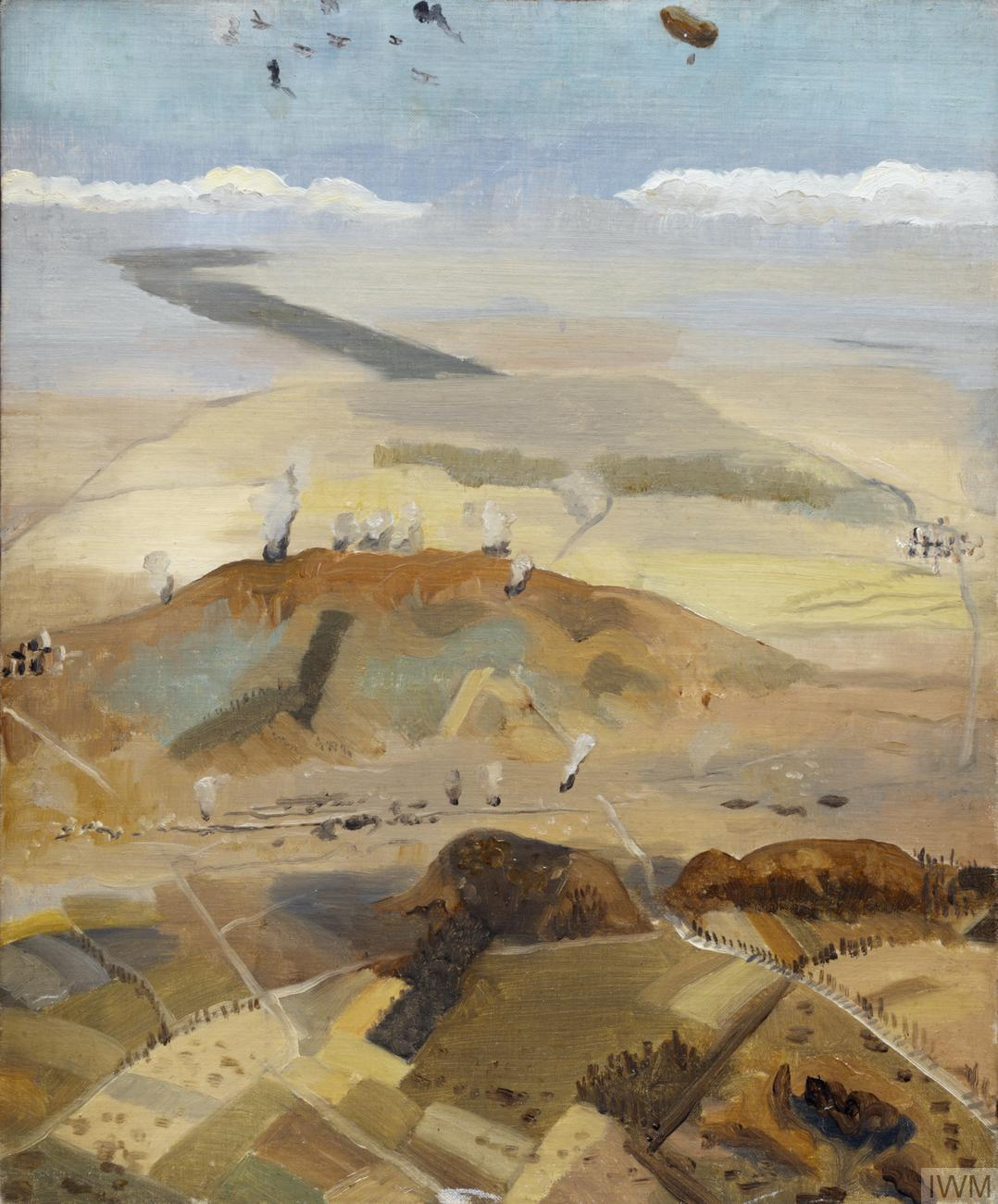
1918 painting of the Kemmelberg by Richard Carline, depicting battles of World War I

The Kemmelberg (English: Kemmel Hill, French: Mont Kemmel) is a hill formation in Flanders, Belgium. It is located less than a kilometre from the village of Kemmel, part of the municipality of Heuvelland in the province of West Flanders. The Kemmelberg is the highest point in the province with an altitude of 154 metres (505 ft), this is the geodetic point with mark Ch63.1, as measured by the National Geographical Institute (NGI) in Brussels in October 1951 via optical levelling.

== History ==
The earliest settlements on the Kemmelberg date to 2,500 ago, when Celtic tribes of the Hallstatt culture populated the area. The hill takes its name from Camulos, the Celtic god of war.

During World War I, it was the location of one of the war's most ferocious battles, the Fourth Battle of Ypres, because of its strategic importance. On 25 April 1918, German imperial forces, hoping to force a breakthrough to the North Sea, started attacking the French troops on the Kemmelberg with gas grenades. At 6 a.m. the German Alpenkorps seized and captured the Kemmelberg, causing Allied troops to withdraw from all the hills in the region. Thousands of French soldiers were killed. Several streets and army barracks in Germany were named after this event (Kemmel-Privatweg in Magdeburg, Kemmelkaserne in Murnau). Friedrich Sixt von Armin and Prince Franz of Bavaria were commanders, but Karl Höfer was celebrated as the hero of Kemmelberg — the Held vom Kemmelberge. It was recaptured during the Battle of the Peaks of Flanders in late September 1918, as a precursor to the Armistice of 11 November 1918.

Two war cemeteries are located to the northeast of the hill, the Kemmel Number 1 French Commonwealth War Graves Commission Cemetery and the Klein Vierstraat British Cemetery with the remains of World War I soldiers. At the top of the Kemmelberg there is a commemorative war memorial, the Monument aux soldats français, constructed in 1932 and inaugurated by French general and war hero Lacappelle. The memorial column is 17 metres (56 ft) high and depicts the Roman victory goddess Victoria. In the area, the monument is colloquially called "The Angel".

A NATO air defence command centre was based in an underground bunker on the southern edge of the hill in the 1950s, which now operates as a visitors centre.

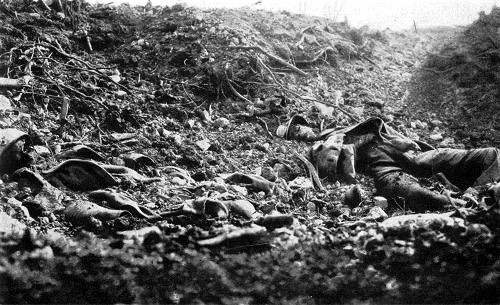
Bodies on the Kemmelberg in April 1918

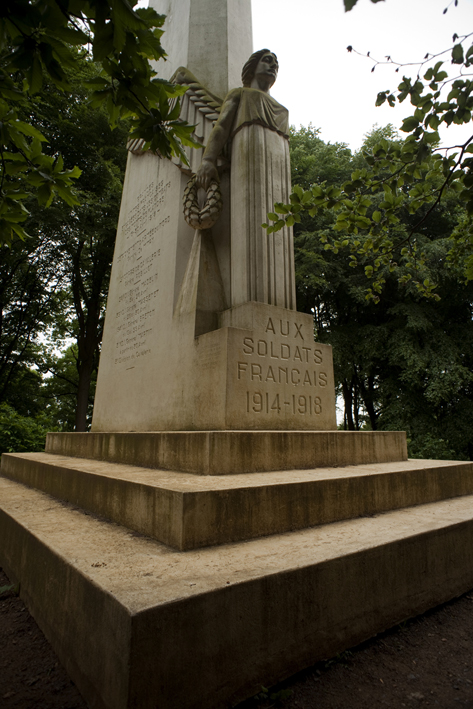
Monument for French soldiers

== Cycling ==
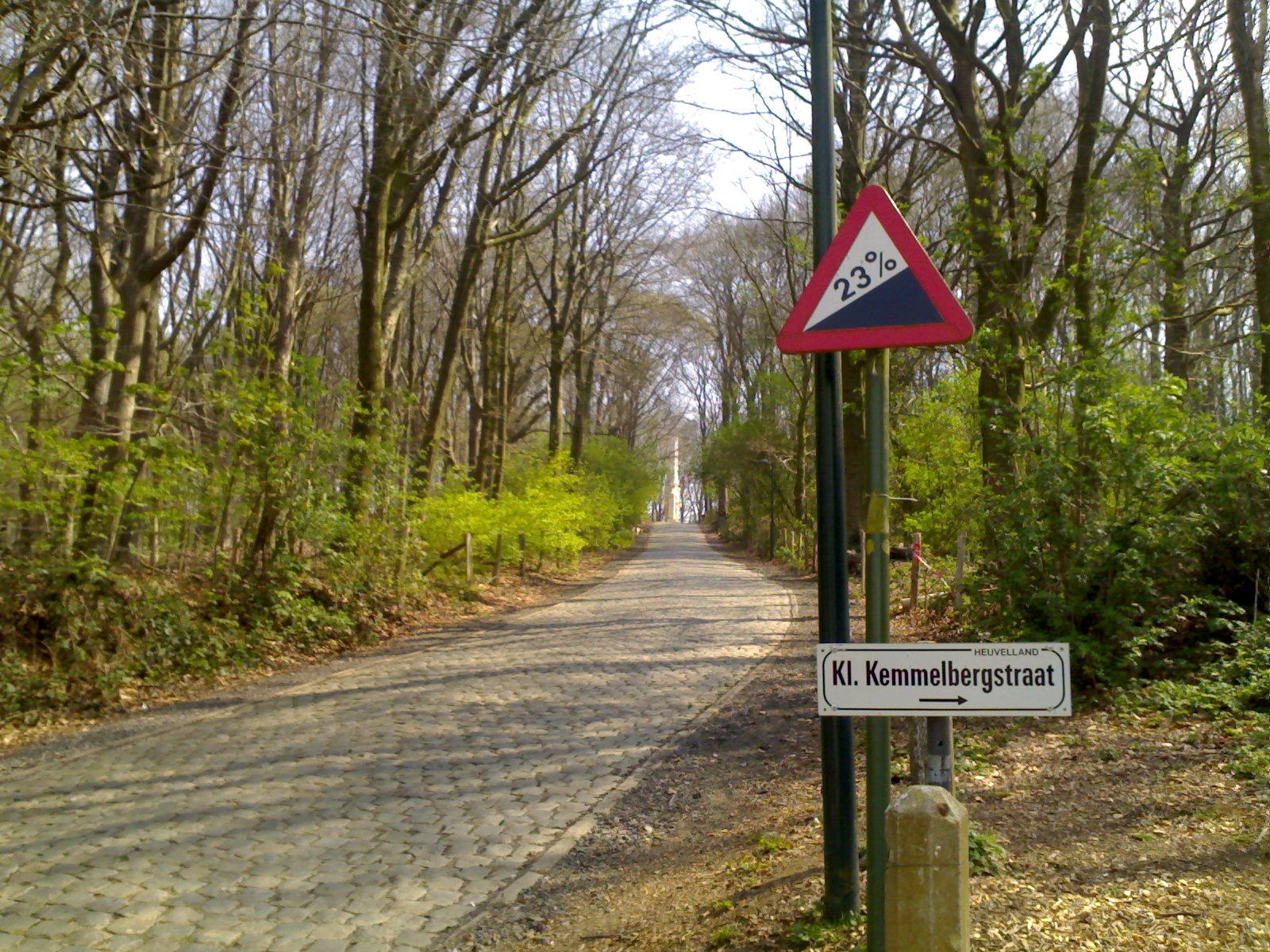
The hill's steep incline on its western ascent

The steep cobbled roads over the hill frequently feature in cycling races, especially in the Flemish spring classics. The climb is often a decisive location in Gent-Wevelgem, but is also regularly included in the Four Days of Dunkirk, the Three Days of De Panne, Three Days of West Flanders and the Tour de l'Eurométropole. In 1950, the Kemmelberg was included in the route of the World Championship, won by Belgian local and cycling icon Briek Schotte.

Kemmelberg-East
- Location: Heuvelland
- Start: Kemmel
- Gain in altitude: 122 m (400 ft)
- Length of climb: 3.0 km (1.9 mi)
- Maximum elevation: 154 m (505 ft)
- Average gradient: 4 %
- Maximum gradient: 22 %

Kemmelberg-West
- Location: Heuvelland
- Start: Kemmel
- Gain in altitude: 109 m (358 ft)
- Length of climb: 2.5 km (1.6 mi)
- Maximum elevation: 154 m (505 ft)
- Average gradient: 4.4 %
- Maximum gradient: 22 %

Kemmelberg-South
- Location: Heuvelland
- Start: Kemmel
- Gain in altitude: 109 m (358 ft)
- Length of climb: 1.4 km (0.87 mi)
- Maximum elevation: 154 m (505 ft)
- Average gradient: 7.8 %
- Maximum gradient: 17 %
