= Croonaert Wood =

Forested area in Belgium

Coordinates: 50.8015°N 2.87747°E

Croonaert Wood is a location in the municipality of Heuvelland near Ypres, Belgium. It is a lightly forested area known for the Bayernwald Trenches open-air museum located there.

== History ==
=== World War I ===
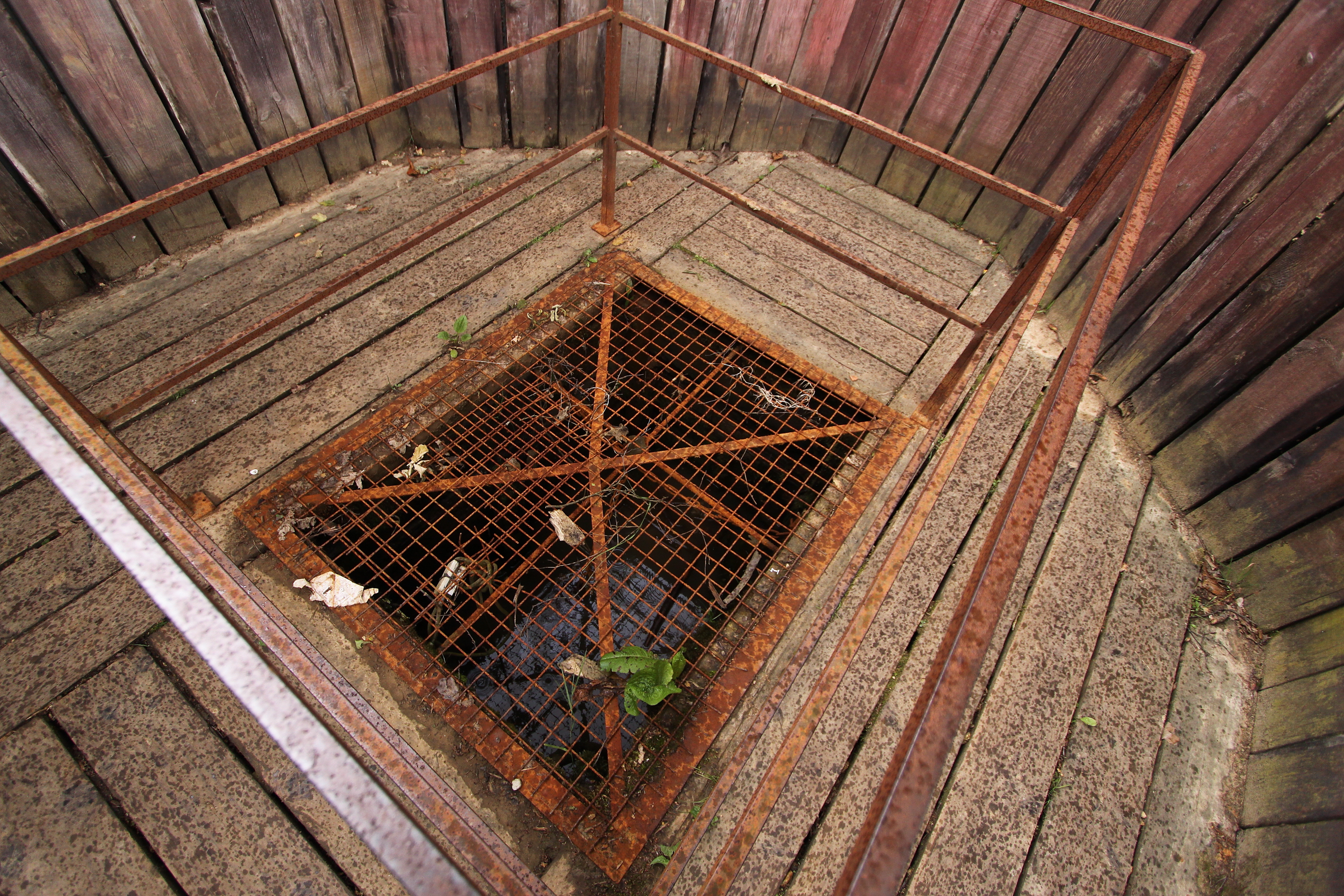
Access to German counter-mining shaft, Bayernwald Trenches, Croonaert Wood

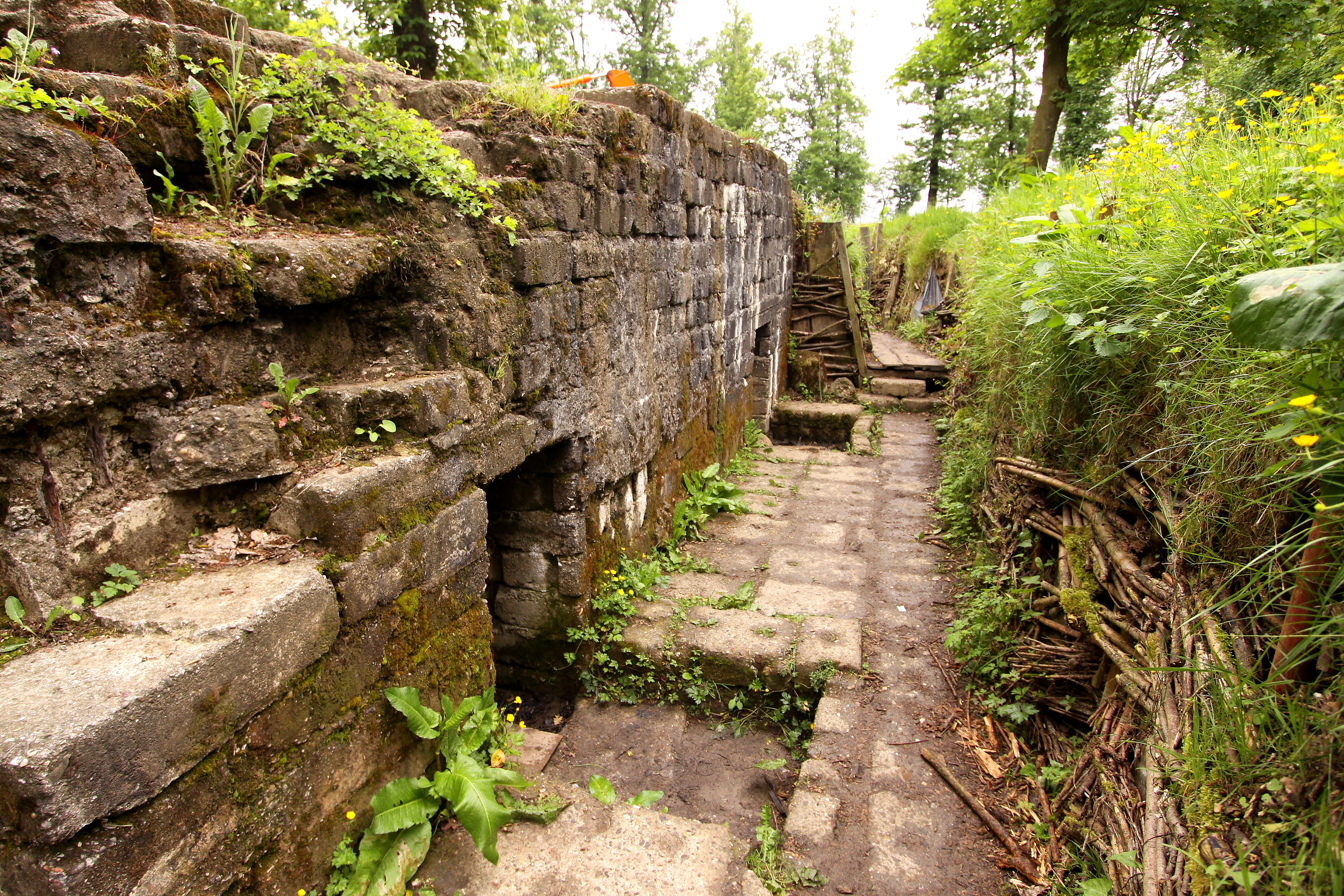
German concrete bunker at the Bayernwald Trenches

In World War I, Croonaert Wood was one of the sites used by German units to defend the area around the Ypres Salient. The Germans built a defensive complex of trenches, dugouts and bunkers on the slightly elevated landscape, from which artillery observers had an excellent view of the ground around Wijtschate and Ypres. The location was called Bayernwald by German soldiers due to the fact that the first German soldiers to be stationed there were from Bavaria ("Bayern" in German). The area was the site of extensive mining activity by both German and British units during the war. Before the Battle of Messines, the tunnelling companies of the Royal Engineers placed a large mine around the German strongpoint Günther, not far from the Bayernwald trenches. It consisted of three chambers (Hollandscheschur Farm 1, 2, 3) which were loaded with a combined charge of 66,600 pounds (30,200 kg) of ammonal. The mine was fired on June 7, 1917 as part of the Mines in the Battle of Messines.

== Croonaert today ==
Currently, Croonaert Wood is a deciduous forest containing the Bayernwald Trenches memorial site.

== See also ==
- Croonaert Chapel Cemetery

== Links and references ==
- Bayernwald Museum and During WW1
