= De Klijte =

Village in Belgium

Coordinates: 50°47′59″N 2°47′59″E

De Klijte (French, La Clytte, West Flemish: De Klyte, locally known as De Kliete) is a village in the municipality of Heuvelland in West Flanders, Belgium. Before the 1977 Belgian municipal reforms, De Klijte was part of the municipality Reningelst. Reningelst proper joined Poperinge, but De Klijte joined the new municipality Heuvelland.

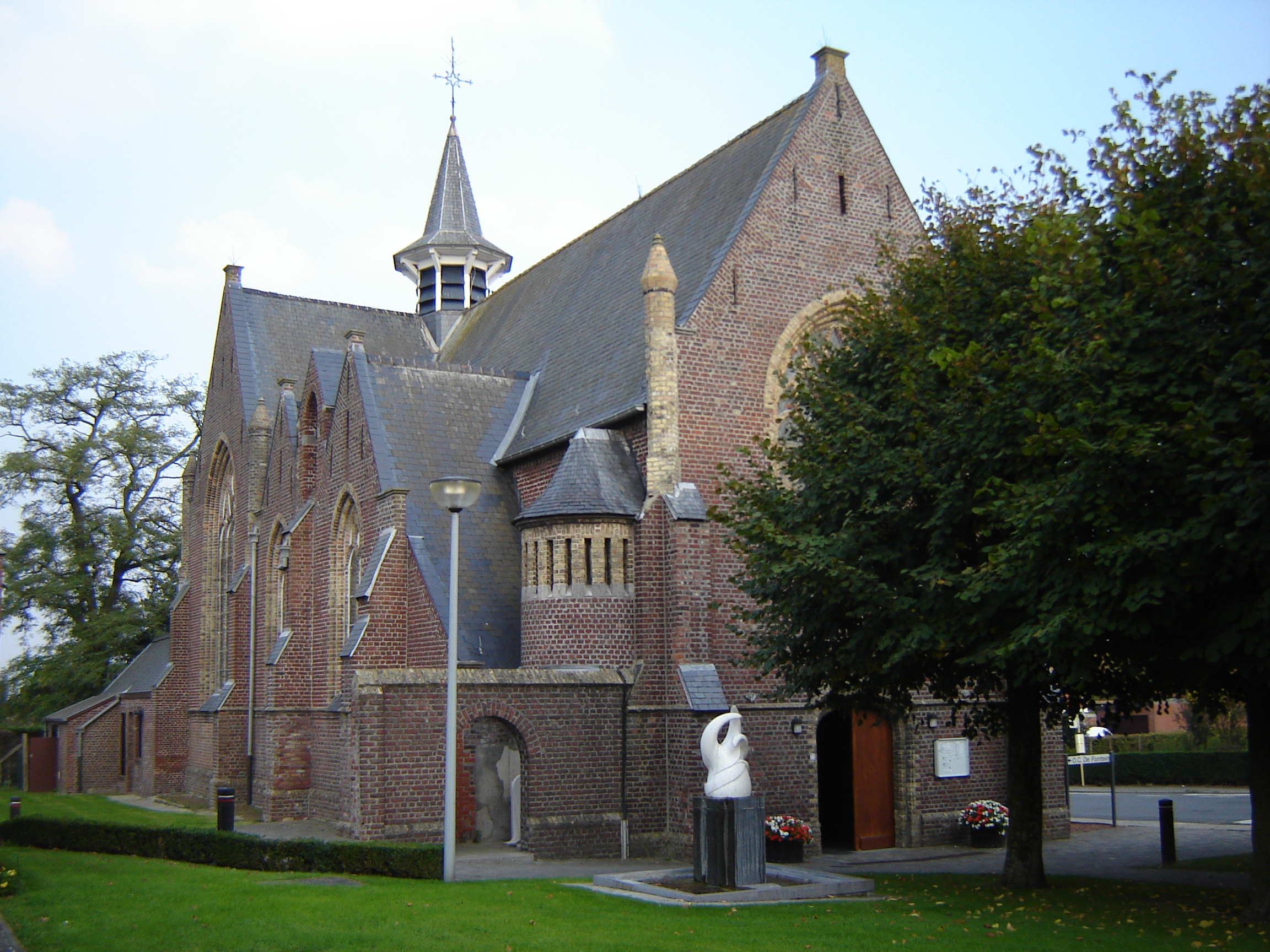
Church of Our Lady in De Klijte

The village is located near the hill Scherpenberg.

== Data and statistics ==
- Area: 4.93 km^{2}
- Population: 576 (2001)
- Postal code: 8954

== See also ==
- Category:Burials at La Clytte Military Cemetery
