= Tiny Legs Tim =

Belgian musician and composer (1978–2022)

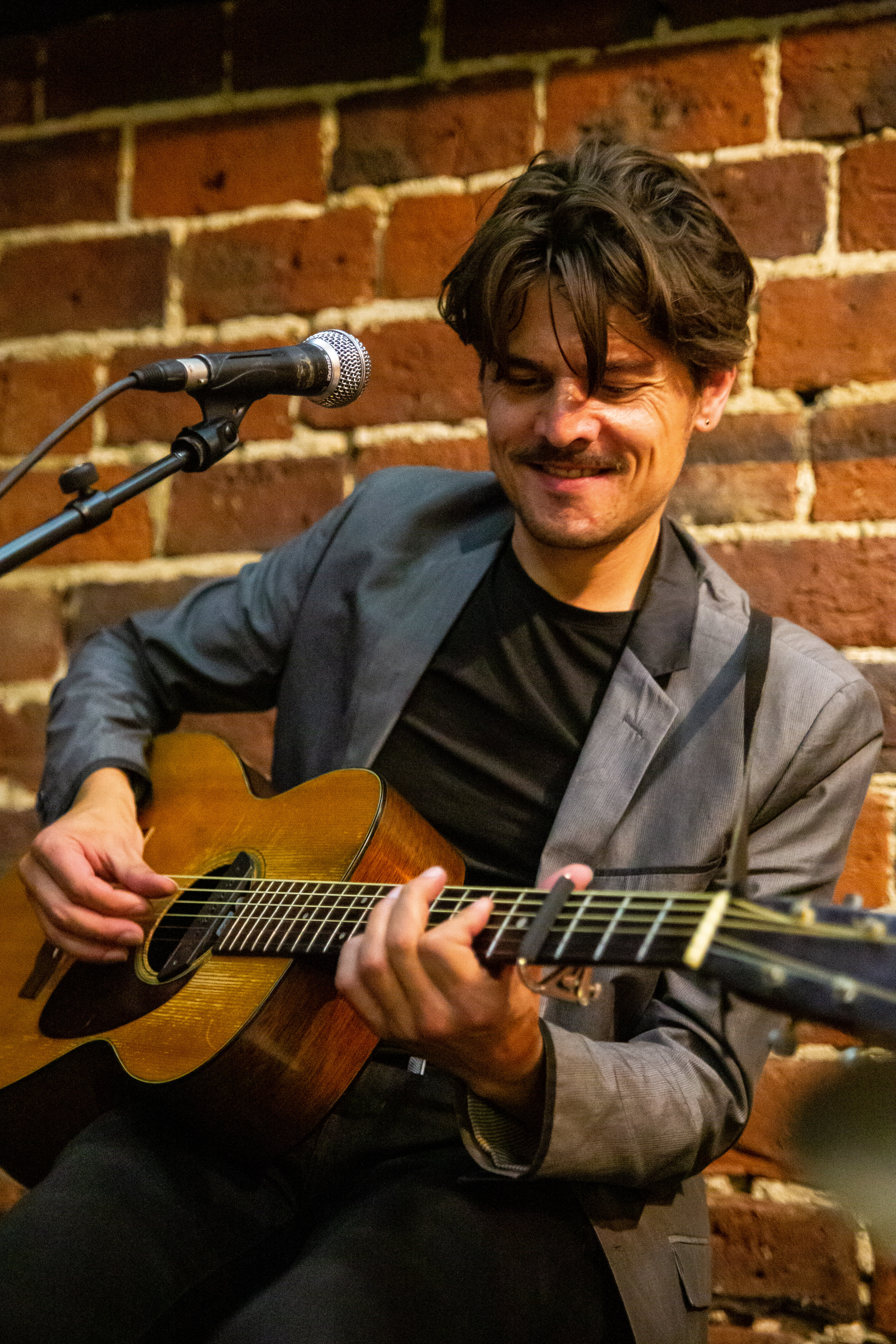

Background information
- Born: Tim De Graeve; November 28, 1978
- Died: May 25, 2022 (aged 43)
- Genre: Blues
- Instruments: Guitar, harmonica, stompbox
- Years active: 2007–2022
- Website: tinylegstim.com

Tim De Graeve (28 November 1978 – 25 May 2022), known professionally as Tiny Legs Tim, was a Belgian blues guitarist and singer-songwriter. De Graeve who also played the harmonica, was the inspirer of the Flemish blues and roots scene in the year 2010, and had his own record label called Sing My Title.

== Biography ==
Tim, born and raised in Westouter, discovered the love of the blues music in the record collection of his father, particularly the acoustic album of Blind Lemon Jefferson. From the age of eight he took classical guitar lessons and soon began writing his own songs. At 17 he started his own blues band.

Tim moved to Ghent to study biology at the university and lived there for the remainder of his life. For a while he worked as a teacher where playing music with his band The Heartfakers was just a hobby. During severe health problems in his twenties, Tim focused on learning to play his grandfather's slide guitar, delving into blues classics such as Delta blues and writing songs. At 29, he decided to pursue his dream of a music career after all. In 2009, he released his debut EP Please Dr. Please as Tiny Legs Tim & The Concrete Blues Band. The years after, his focus was on releasing solo work as a singer-songwriter.

His stage name, Tiny Legs, was a reference to his small and lean appearance that was a result of his severe liver disease. The inspiration came from some of his blues heroes such as Blind Willie Johnson, Big Bill Broonzy and Sleepy John Estes who also bear three-part names that often describe a physical characteristic. He found it a funny name that was self-deprecating. It was a way of dealing with his "new" body.

In Ghent, mainly in the borough Klein Turkije (English: Little Turkey), Tiny Legs Tim became the voice of a completely new blues generation, along with fellow blues musician Lightnin' Guy. In 2011, Guy started organizing electric blues jams, first in small B&B places, then at the Volkshuis. From 2014 to 2018, they co-organized the blues festival Boogieville in De Vooruit's Ballroom.

In 2015, with his help and advice, Tim's good friends Marie Follebout and Jelle de Boevé became owners and founders of the blues and roots concert club Missy Sippy in Klein Turkije, where Tim became their house musician. He performed there numerous times and curated the blues jams. In addition, he and the club sought alternative music styles such as funk, americana, jazz, country, rock and roll, burlesque and soul to give more young musicians a chance. Until his death, Tim organized around thirty concerts for the Missy Sippy Blues & Roots Festival, each time during the ten days of Gentse Feesten in July. On the occasion of the club's fifth anniversary, Tim released an album called Missy Sippy All Stars Volume 1 in March 2020 that was recorded with 20-some promising musicians.

To find inspiration in the blues, Tim traveled to Louisiana in the United States in 2017, mainly to New Orleans. African music like Maliblues and Tuareg blues also inspired him by means of their rhythmic feel, with lots of percussion.

Tim performed mostly solo with his so-called One Man Blues Band in clubs and on festivals throughout Europe. He was supporting act of Peter Doherty, John Mayall, The North Mississippi Allstars, Graham Parker, Bombino and Ian Siegal. He had a name of having a strong live reputation.

Tim released all his records independently to maintain complete control over his own musical identity. Thus, he enjoyed making solo records with just him as singer and musician. In 2015, with his third record Stepping Up, Tim started a real record label called Sing My Title. His label releases albums from Flemish blues and roots musicians such as Kaai Man from Temse, Paul Couter, Steven Troch from Mechelen, Little Jimmy and the band A Murder in Mississippi.

Exactly a year after his death Tim got a posthumous tribute with the release of his single "Death Bells Ringing" on 25 May 2023 and furthermore on his birthday 28 November the release of the album Sing My Title with fifteen new and unreleased songs, followed by the memorial-concert "Sing My Title: Friends & Artists celebrating Tiny Legs Tim" in Ghent.

== Personal life ==
Tim suffered from severe liver disease most of his adult life and underwent two liver transplants in his twenties. With the third transplant he died during surgery at the age of 43.

== Discography ==
- Please Dr. Please – EP – 2009
- They Say Small Birds Don't Fly Too High – EP – 2010
- One Man Blues – CD/LP – 2011
- Constant Constable – EP – 2011
- Cortisone Blues – single – 2012
- TLT – CD/LP – 2013
- Diggin' Deeper – EP – 2013
- Stepping up – CD/LP – 2015
- Sad Sad – single – 2016
- Live at Sint-Jacobs – LP/CD – 2016
- Melodium Rag – LP/CD – 2017
- Elsewhere Bound – LP/CD – 2019
- Future Poets – single – 2019
- Missy Sippy All Stars Vol. I – LP/CD – 2020
- Call Us When It's Over – LP/CD – 2020
- Death Bells Ringing – single – 2023
- Sing My Title – LP/CD – 2023

== Podcasts ==
- Tiny Legs Tim and UZ Gent Hospital: "Success thanks to teamwerk and the blues". Denkzorg.uzgent.be (in Belgian Dutch). 2019-11-04.
- "A tribute to Tiny Legs Tim". Open.spotify.com. Into the Soul of The Blues (in Belgian Dutch). 2022-07-08.

== Sources and references ==
- "A tribute to Tiny Legs Tim (biography)". Souloftheblues.be (in Dutch). 2022-09-14.
