= Wulverghem =

Wulverghem Wulvergem
- Village
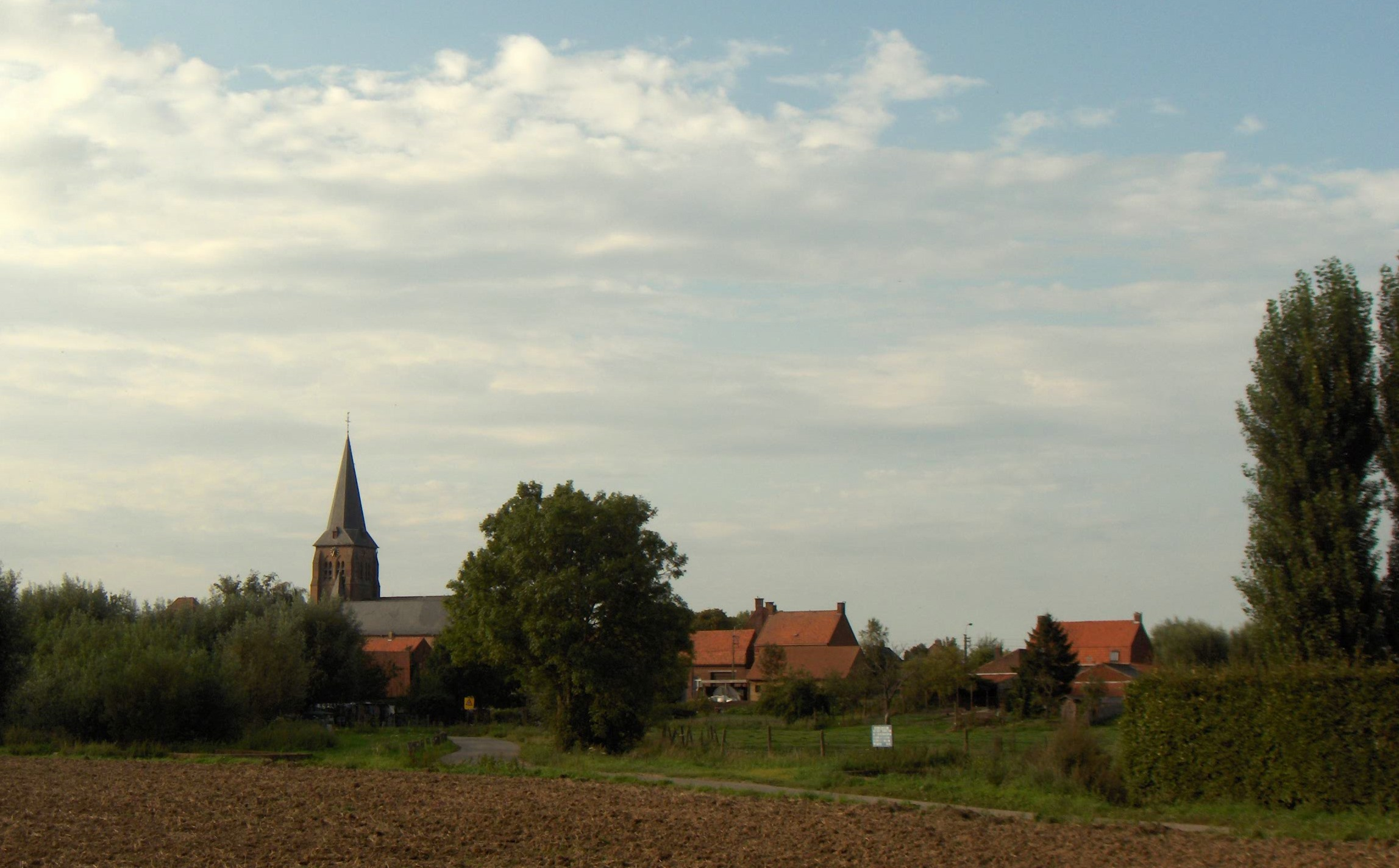
- A view of the town from the south

- Wulvergem's location inside the Huevelland municipality
- Coordinates: 50°45′36″N 2°51′10″E
- Country: Belgium
- Community: Flemish Community
- Region: Flanders
- Province: West Flanders
- Municipality: Heuvelland

Area
- 350 ha (860 acres)

Population
  - Total: 260
- Postal code: 8952

Wulverghem (also known as Wulvergem) is a Belgian village. It is the smallest village in the Heuvelland Municipality, with 260 people, and a total area of 350 hectares.

== History ==
The area experienced many major battles during World War I, as part of the Ypres Salient area. On 30 April and 17 June 1916, the area was the site of two German gas attacks on British troops at Wulverghem.

Wulverghem, along with the village of Frelinghien were believed to be the locations of the Christmas Day Truce of 1914 and the supposed football match that ensued.
