= Kemmel Number 1 French Cemetery =

WWI CWGC cemetery in Ypres, France

Kemmel No. 1 French Cemetery
- Commonwealth War Graves Commission
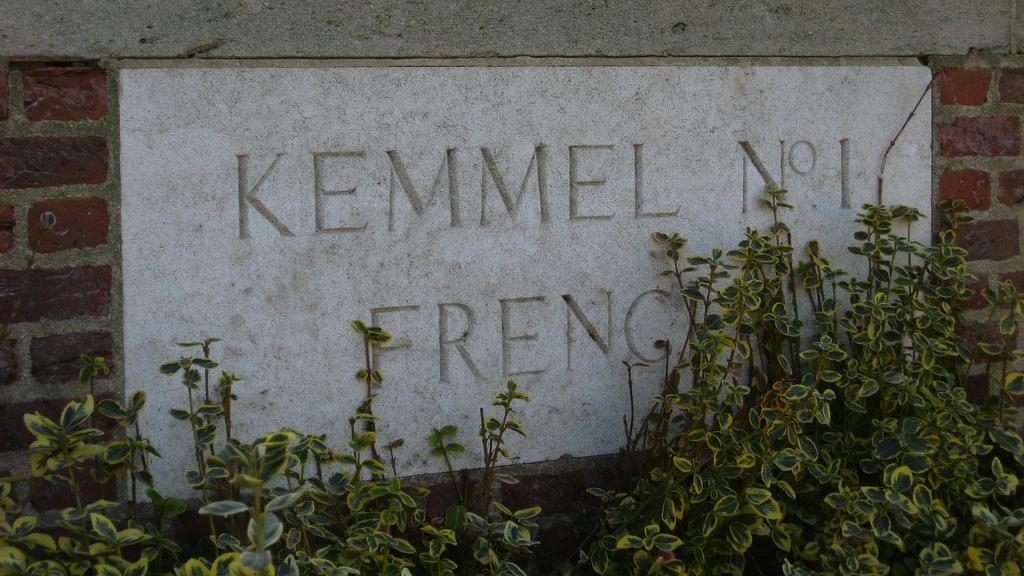
- Used for those deceased Unknown
- Established: Unknown
- Location: 50°48′18″N 02°50′26″E near Kemmel, Heuvelland, West Flanders, Belgium
- Designed by: Sir Edwin Lutyens
- Total burials: 390
- Unknowns: 349

Burials by nation
- Allied Powers: United Kingdom 278; Australia 12; Canada 3; New Zealand 3; Central Powers: Germany 94

Burials by war
- World War I: 390
- Statistics source: WW1Cemeteries.com and CWGC

Kemmel No. 1 French Cemetery is a Commonwealth War Graves Commission (CWGC) burial ground for the dead of the First World War located in the Ypres Salient on the Western Front.

The cemetery grounds were assigned to the United Kingdom in perpetuity by King Albert I of Belgium in recognition of the sacrifices made by the British Empire in the defence and liberation of Belgium during the war.

== Foundation ==
The cemetery is unusual for having unknown origins. It was discovered by the French after the Armistice and contained the bodies of Commonwealth, French and German troops. Despite the name of the cemetery, the French graves were removed to Kemmel French Ossuary and the large French cemetery at Potyze, leaving the Commonwealth and German graves.

The cemetery was enlarged by concentrating nearby battlefield graves and three British graves, two from a local churchyard and one from a nearby German cemetery. Also included in the concentration were more German graves found in the former battlefields by the Belgians. The cemetery was designed by Sir Edwin Lutyens.

== See also ==
- Kemmelberg
