= R.E. Farm Cemetery =

WWI CWGC burial ground in Ypres, Belgium

- Commonwealth War Graves Commission
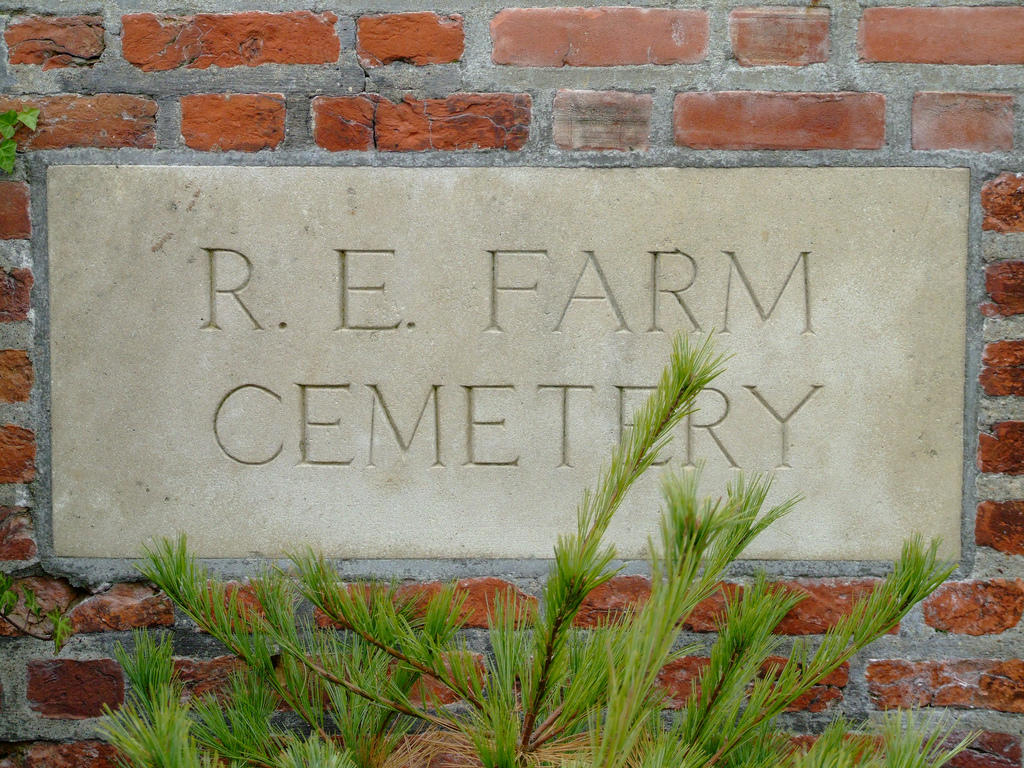
- Used for those deceased 1914–1918
- Established: 1914
- Location: 50°46′03″N 02°51′37″E near Wytschaete, Heuvelland, Belgium
- Designed by: Wilfred Clement Von Berg
- Total burials: 179
- Unknowns: 11

Burials by nation
- Allied Powers: United Kingdom 132; Canada 47

Burials by war
- World War I: 179
- Statistics source: WW1Cemeteries.com and CWGC

R.E. Farm Cemetery is a Commonwealth War Graves Commission (CWGC) burial ground for the dead of the First World War located in the Ypres Salient on the Western Front in Belgium.

The cemetery grounds were assigned to the United Kingdom in perpetuity by King Albert I of Belgium in recognition of the sacrifices made by the British Empire in the defence and liberation of Belgium during the war.

== Foundation ==
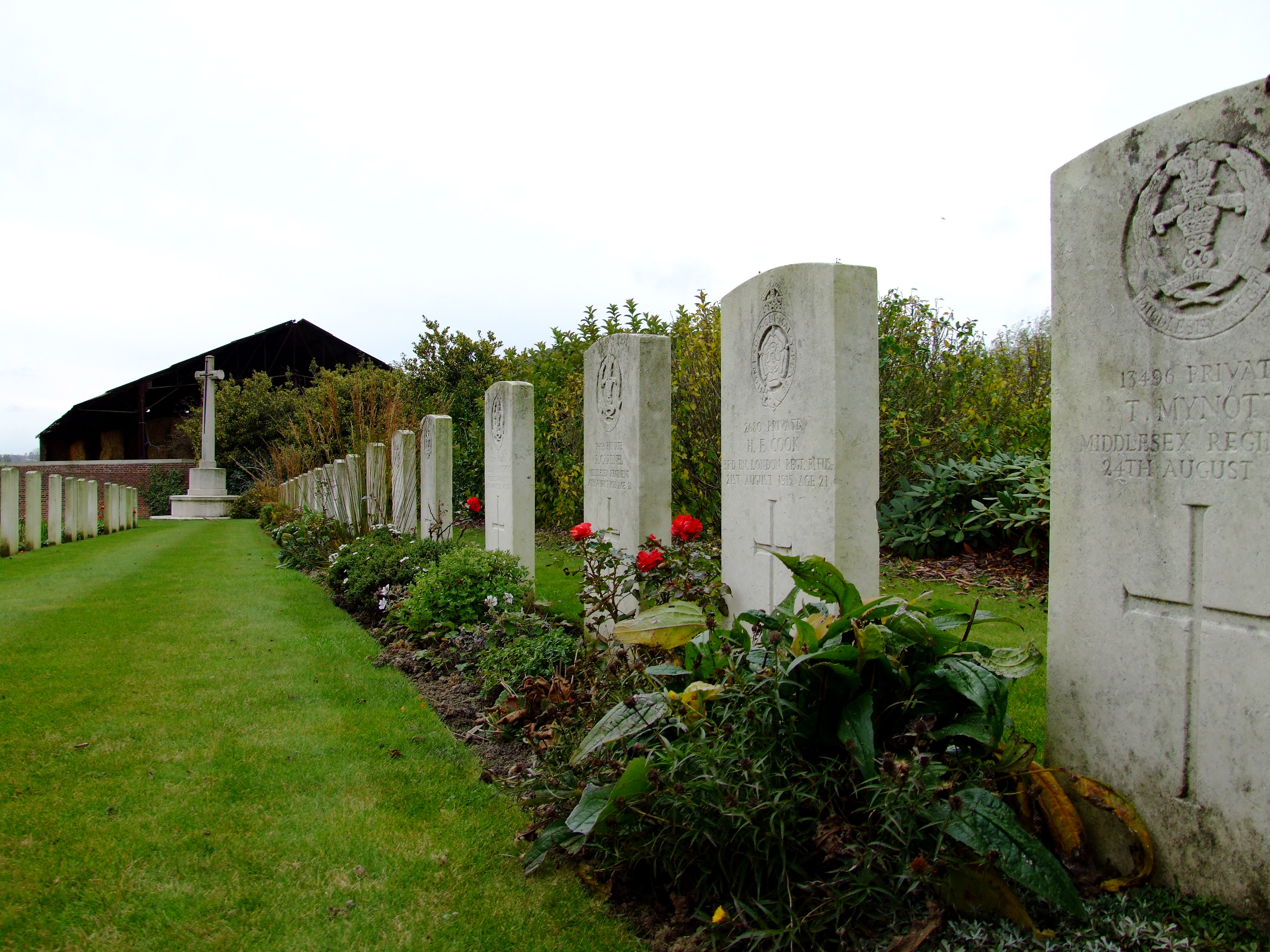
Graves in RE Farm cemetery

The area around R.E. Farm Cemetery was much fought over during the Great War. The invading German armies took Wytschaete on 1 November 1914; it was retaken in June 1917 but lost during the Spring Offensive in April 1918; the Allies finally retook the area in September 1918 as the fighting swept out of the Salient with the crumbling of German forces in the face of the Hundred Days Offensive. The site of the cemetery itself remained in Allied hands until the Spring Offensive. The site originally held a farm building, known officially as Ferme des douze Bonniers. British troops called this R.E. Farm.

The cemetery was established by the 1st Dorsets in December 1914. A second cemetery was established nearby, also by the Dorsets, which was concentrated into R.E. Farm Cemetery after the Armistice.

The cemetery was designed by WC Von Berg.
