= List of works by Christopher Whall =

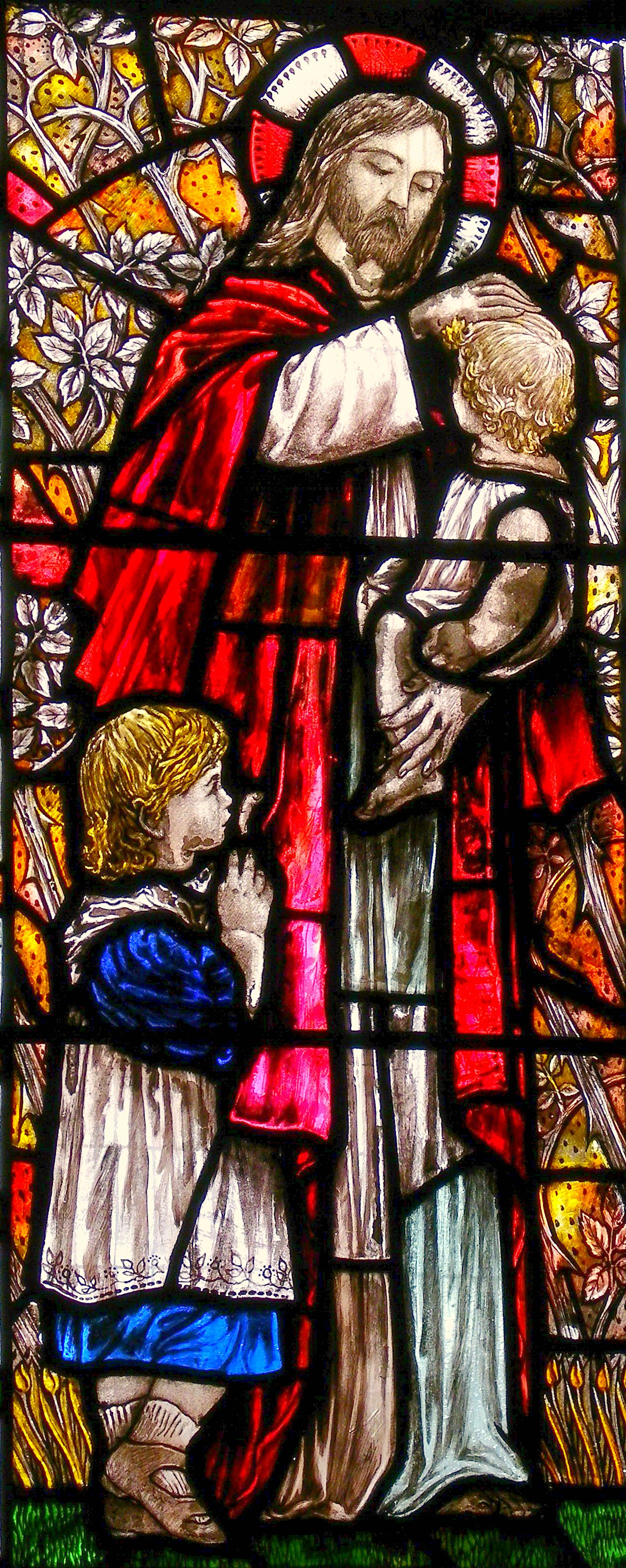
Jesus blessing the children a work by Whall in Holy Trinity Church, Bracknell. Shown courtesy Robin Croft.

This is a list of the stained-glass works of Christopher Whall (1849–1924).

He was a gentle, friendly, great-hearted man, in spirit very like the knightly crusaders and wise friendly saints who feature in his own windows in silver and jewels...He was of those "Dreamers whose dreams come true...."

— Tribute from Charles Connick on Whall's death

Whall's works include:

- Gloucester Cathedral
- War Memorial windows
- Works in Scotland
- Cathedral and minster windows

== Works in parish churches ==
Church	Location	Date(s)	Subject, notes and references
Holy Trinity	Sloane Street Inner London		Whall completed eight windows at Holy Trinity in Sloane Street. Holy Trinity was called "the Cathedral of the Arts & Crafts" by John Betjeman and it is certainly a treasure-house for lovers of stained glass. It holds some of Christopher Whall's finest work and along with his work at Gloucester Cathedral, the Holy Trinity windows constitute the most extensive surviving schemes of his stained glass. Christopher Whall designed the two windows on the South side of the church and also six clerestory windows. One of the two windows on the South side is "The Adoration of the Magi and the Shepherds." It is a three-light traceried window, designed by Whall and made by him and his assistants in the workshops of Messrs. Lowndes and Drury. These workshops were in The Glass House at 11 Lattice Street in Fulham, London. Christopher Whall and Alfred Drury designed the building, built in 1906, that was to become a centre for prominent stained glass artists. "The Adoration of the Magi and the Shepherds" was given to the church by Mrs E. Harvey in memory of her husband Edmund Harvey. In his pamphlet Peter Cormack (Note: Peter Cormack has worked tirelessly over the last 35 years to make the work of Whall and his school better known and his effort should be acknowledged. From 1979 onwards, for example, he organised the first ever exhibitions (at William Morris Gallery) about Whall, Woodroffe, Parsons, Holiday, Women Stained Glass Artists, etc., each of which was accompanied by a catalogue - the first modern publications on their subjects. Before Cormack started work in this field it is fair to say that this type of stained glass was entirely ignored by art historians and it is largely due to Cormack's pioneering work that this omission has been rectified.) states that "The Adoration of the Magi and the Shepherds" adapted a design by Whall for a painted altarpiece (triptych) for the chapel of Douglas Castle in Lanarkshire. Whall subsequently made several versions of this triptych in stained glass. The second window is a four-light traceried window entitled "The Holy Spirit and Pentecost". This window was designed by Whall and made by him and his team of assistants at 1, Ravenscourt Park, Hammersmith. Whall now had his own premises and no longer used those of Lowndes & Drury. This window was given by Mrs. Frederick Cook in memory of her husband, Wyndham Francis Cook. The memorial inscription runs across the base of the four lights and reads-"To the Glory of God and in memory of Wyndham Francis Cook. Born Aug. 21, 1860. Died May 17th 1905. This window is dedicated by his widow. I thank God upon every remembrance of you." Some images of "The Holy Spirit and Pentecost" and "The Adoration of the Magi and the Shepherds" are shown below mostly courtesy Sheepdog Rex. During the period when the Holy Trinity windows were made, the following were amongst those who worked as Whall's assistants: Edward Woore (1880–1960), Mary Hutchinson (1876–1930), Karl Parsons (1884–1934), Arnold Robinson (1888–1955) and John E. Tarbox (1886–1968). By the 1910s his daughter Veronica Whall (1887–1967) increasingly played an active part in Whall's studios. With the founding of Whall & Whall Limited in 1922 the father-and-daughter collaboration was formalised. At other times Whall was to be assisted by Louis Davis (1860–1941), and Paul Woodroffe (1875–1954).

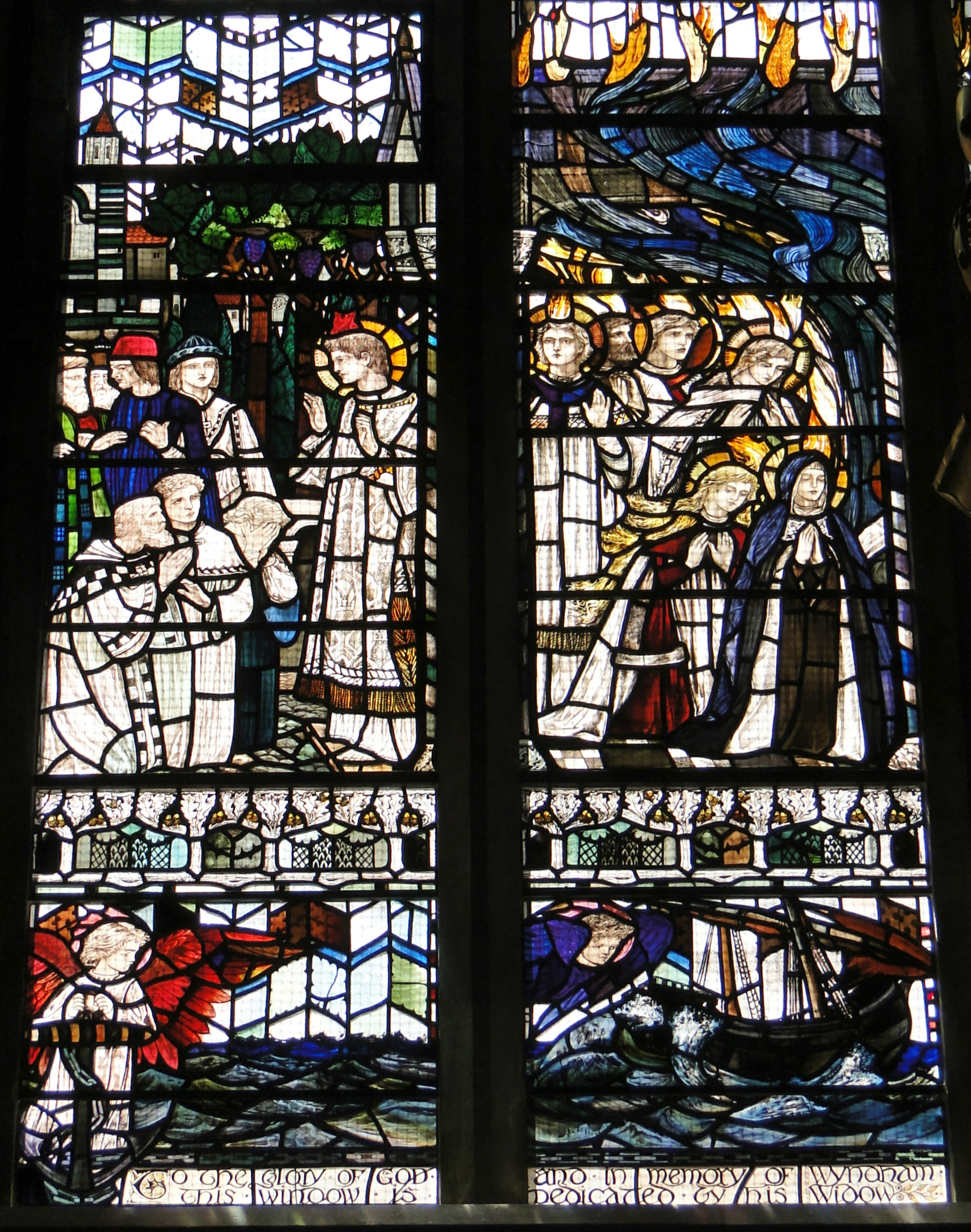
First and second lights in Whall's four-light traceried window "The Holy Spirit and Pentecost" at Holy Trinity Sloane Street.

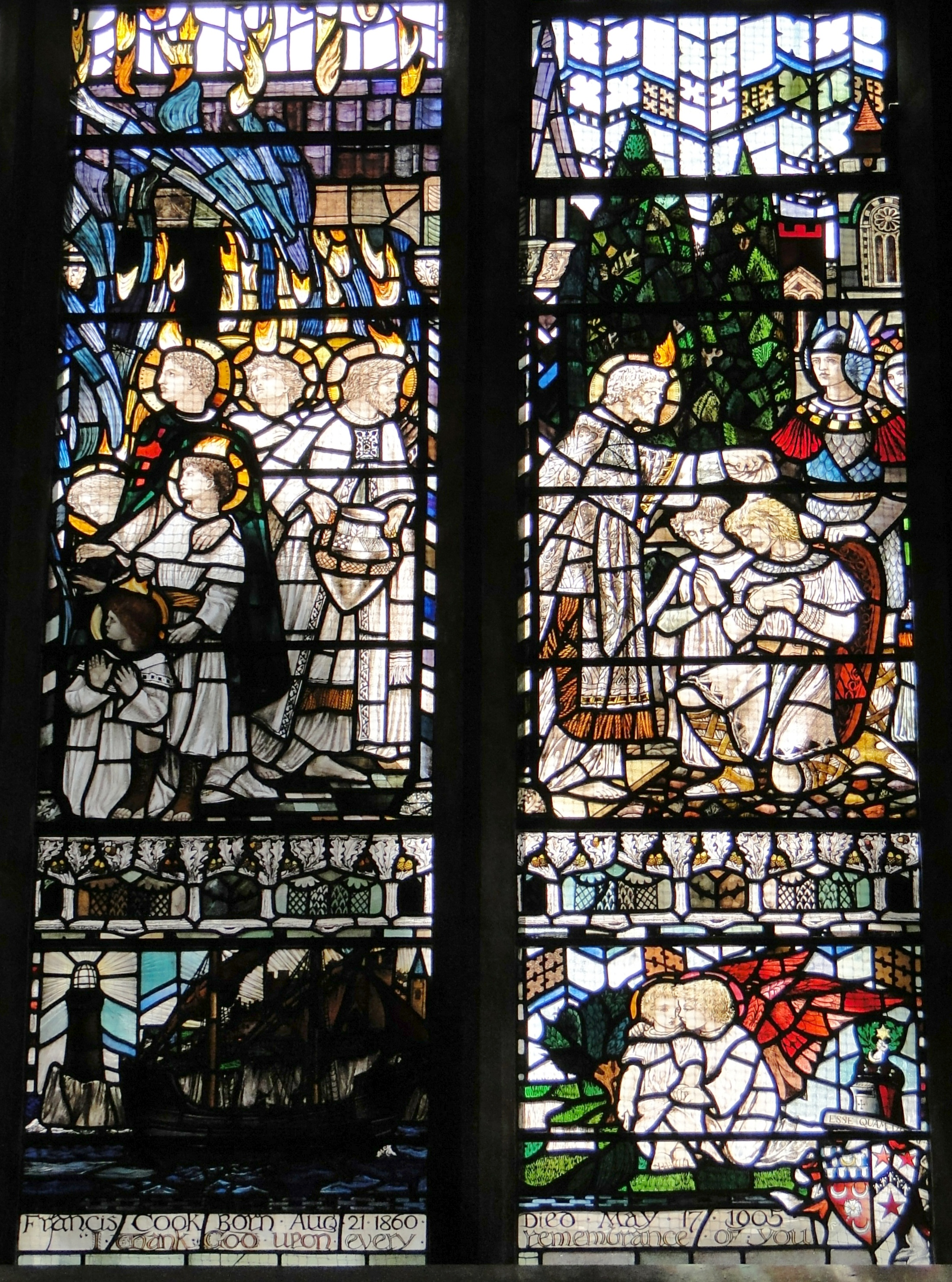
Third and fourth lights in Whall's four-light traceried window "The Holy Spirit and Pentecost" at Holy Trinity Sloane Street.

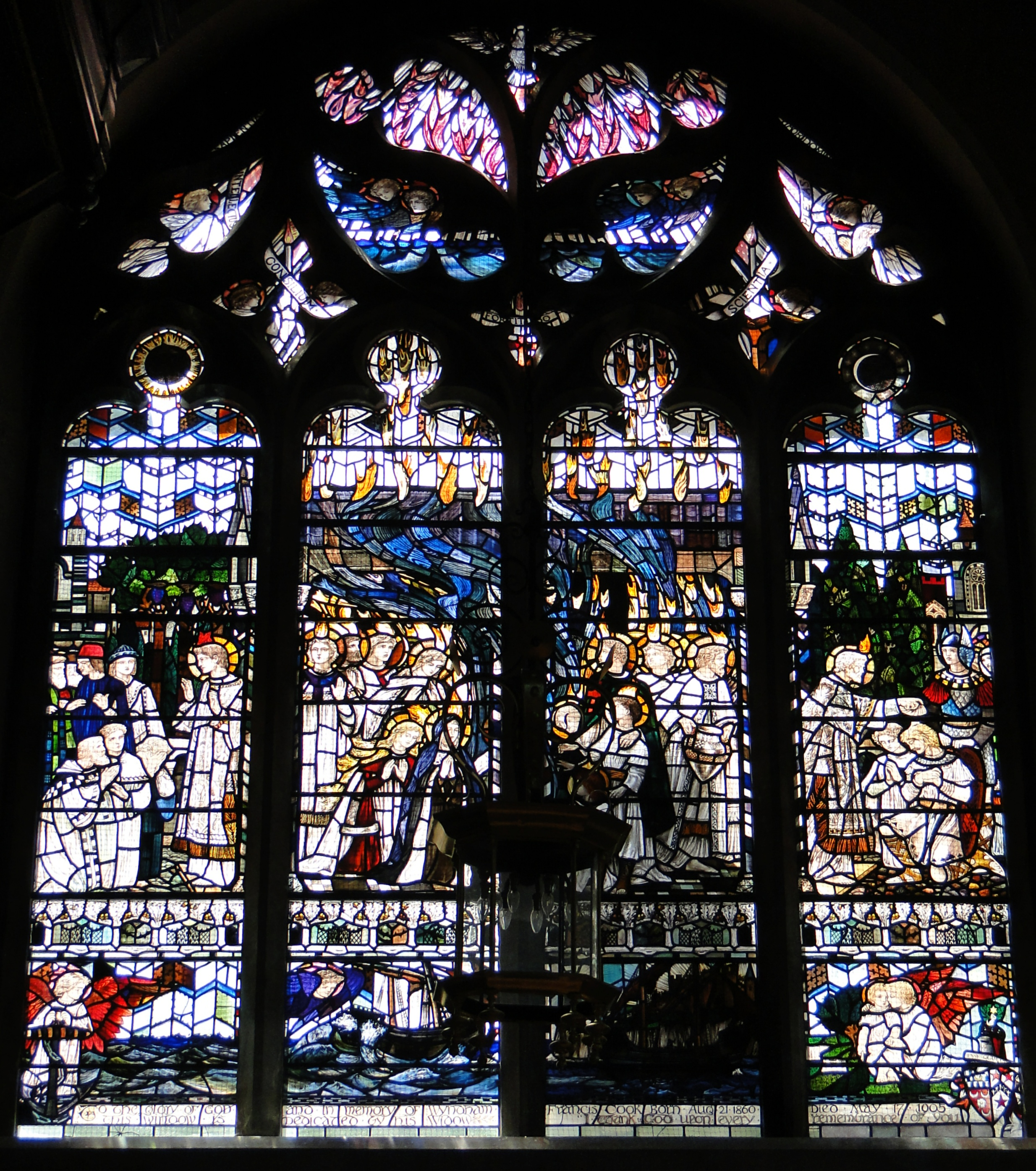
View of the complete four-light traceried window "The Holy Spirit and Pentecost" at Holy Trinity Sloane Street.

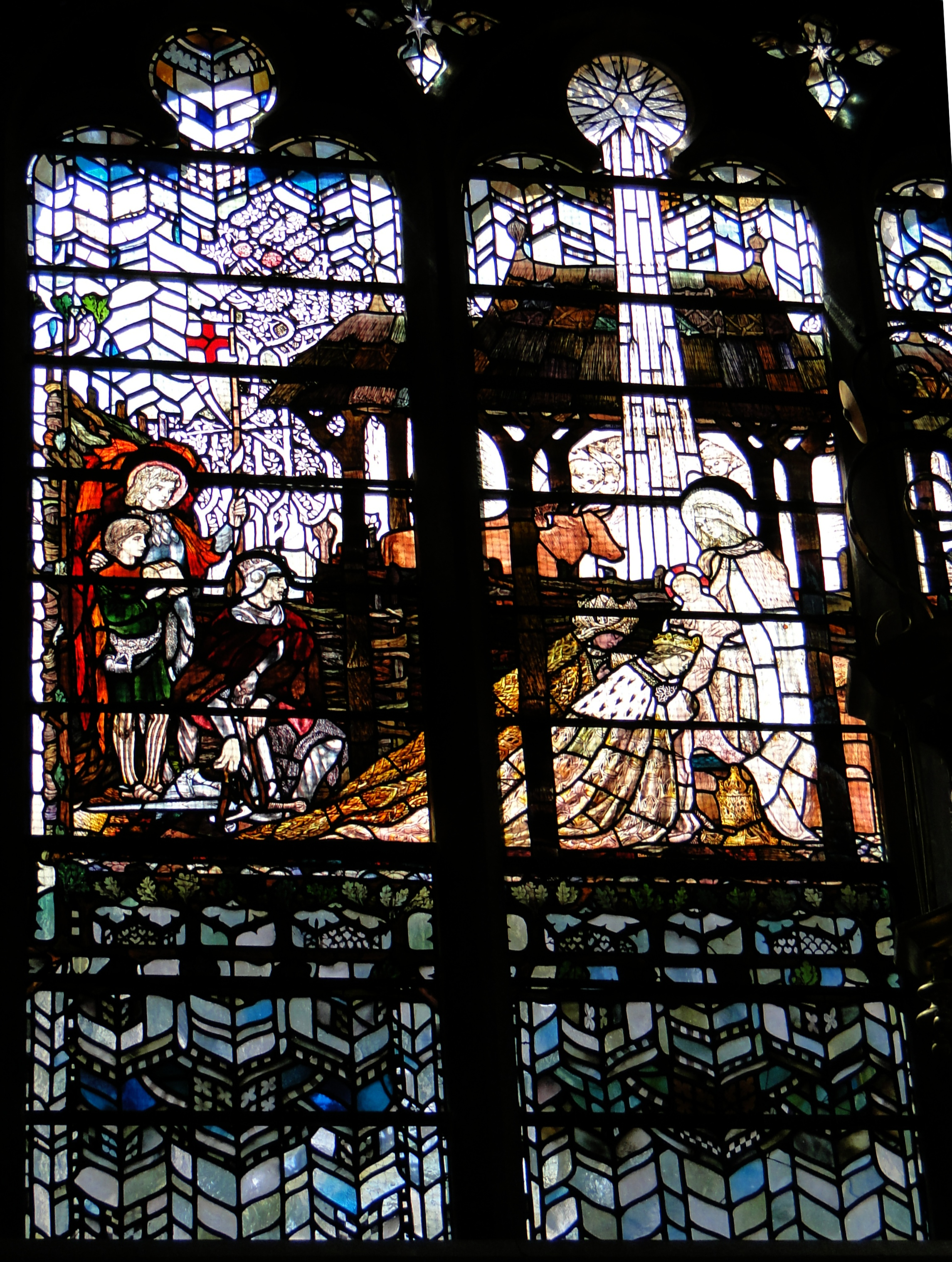
Part of Whall's window "The Adoration of the Magi and the Shepherds" at Holy Trinity Sloane Street.

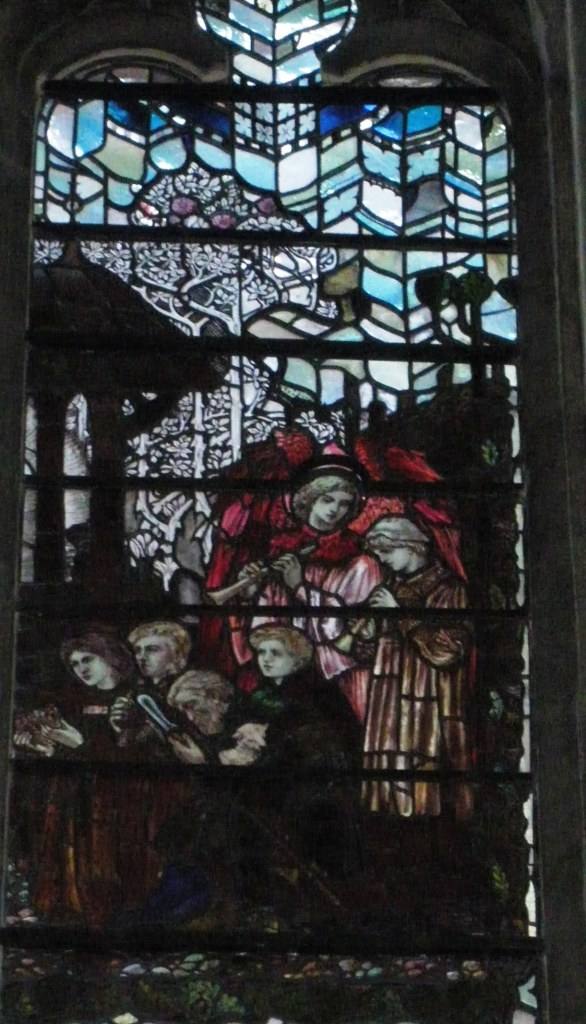
Part of Whall's window "The Adoration of the Magi and the Shepherds" at Holy Trinity Sloane Street.

Church	Location	Date(s)	Subject, notes and references
St Martin	Litchborough, Northamptonshire	1888	Whall designed a five-light window for this church, a commission through James Powell and Sons. It is an East window in memory of the Rev W.T.Browning (1823–1883). In the upper lights Whall depicts "Christ in Majesty" and four adoring Angels and in the lower lights, Christ the Good Shepherd, St Peter, St John the Baptist, St John the Evangelist and St Paul. The predella subjects at the base of the window are the Charge to Peter, St John the Baptist preaching, Christ blessing children, the Adoration of the Lamb and St Paul at Miletus- Farewell to the Elders. Acts XX 28.
St Giles	Stanton St Quintin, Wiltshire	1888	Working through James Powell and Sons, Whall completed a three-light window for the Nave of this church depicting Jesus with cross, John the Baptist and Paul. See images in gallery shown courtesy Hilary Greene.
St Patrick	Hove, Sussex	1889	Whall designed an Opus Panel for this church through James Powell and Sons entitled "Suffer Little Children". See image in gallery below shown courtesy Richard and Enid Lovett.
Birkdale United Reformed Church	Birkdale, Merseyside	1889	The East window in this Congregational church was designed by Whall for James Powell and Sons.
Convent of Notre Dame	Birkdale, Merseyside	1889	Again through James Powell and Sons, Whall designed five windows for the Convent's Chapel. However the Convent and Chapel were extensively altered in the 1960s and then demolished and rebuilt in the early 1980s and it seems that the windows were lost at some point during these changes.
St Seiriol Church	Penmaenmawr	1889	The church was built in 1867 in the parish of Dwygyfylchi, to serve the expanding population of Penmaenmawr and designed by Alfred Waterhouse. It is built in the Gothic Revival style and was in fact built at the instigation of William Ewart Gladstone, the great Victorian prime minister, who had a house in the Dwygyfylchi area. The freestanding tower was added in 1885. St Seiriol's retains many of the original fittings that were designed by the architect. There is a Whall commission in this church. See image in gallery below shown courtesy Peter Jones. Whall's window dates from 1889 and is a two-light window and was made in the studios of James Powell & Sons. In the left-hand light Christopher is shown wading through the waters with the Christ-child on his shoulder. In the right-hand light a male figure kneels before a vision of the Christ-child surrounded by child angels. Further images of children with biblical texts feature in the trefoils above. The window is situated on the North wall of the Lady Chapel. The texts below the main lights read "When thou passest through the waters, I will be with thee" (Isaiah 43:2); "Inasmuch as ye have done it unto one of the least of these my brethren, ye have done it unto me" (Matthew 25:40). The texts in the upper trefoil lights read : "'So when they cry unto the Lord in their trouble, He delivereth them out of their distress"' (Psalm 107:28); "For He maketh the storm to cease so that the waves thereof are still"' (Psalm 107:29); "Then are they glad because they are at rest and so He bringeth them unto the haven where they would be" (Psalm 107:30). The dedication on the window reads- To the Glory of God and in loving memory of Robin the youngest child of William and Hannah Watts Jones, born 21 February 1880, died at sea 3 November 1885
St Mary	Ticehurst, Sussex	1890	A window of three lights. Here again Whall was working for James Powell & Sons. The window depicts Christ blessing children. It was formerly in the South Aisle area but is now the East window of the new extension.
St Alban the Martyr	Holborn, London	1890	This Butterfield church was hit badly by German incendiary bombs in 1941 and a good part of it had to be rebuilt after the war. Whall executed a wall painting entitled "Christ in the Sepulchre" and this survived the bombing and is in the Mortuary Chapel of the Holy Sepulchre which now serves as the Sacristy. The Chapel was designed by C.H.M. Mileham.
St Mary	Stamford, Lincolnshire	1891 and 1893	Whall designed the Lady Chapel East window in 1891. This was Whall's first independent commission and was given to him by John Dando Sedding. Whall described the window as "the foundation and beginning of everything". Indeed Whall designed and made the window, with the help of one assistant, in a cowshed at Stonebridge, near Dorking in Surrey which Whall was using as a workshop. Meticulous preparation was said to have gone into producing the window, including the making of a suit of armour for the St Michael figure from papier-mâché - which his assistant had to wear! The window shows Adam and Eve in the outer main lights flanking Gabriel and St Michael with the Virgin & Child in the centre light. The tracery lights are based on the Mysteries of the Rosary. At the apex of the tracery is the Coronation of the Virgin. The firing and glazing were carried out by Britten & Gilson. The image in gallery below is shown courtesy Peter Jones. In The Buildings of England: Lincolnshire by Nikolaus Pevsner and John Harris they say of this window "in a style derived from the Pre-Raphaelites but more hard edged and Impressionist". There is a second window dating to 1893 in the North side of the Lady Chapel this completed jointly with Louis Davis.
St James Church	Somerton, Oxfordshire	1893	The window at the East end of the North aisle is known as the "William Barnes Memorial Window". It depicts the Risen Christ with St James and St Paul and is one of Whall's earlier works. Notable for its simple but effective colour scheme of deep blues combined with silvery white and off-white tints of glass. The window was made under Whall's direction by James Powell & Sons. It is recorded that the armour worn by the sleeping soldier below the figure of Christ was designed and made up in cardboard by Whall, this to be worn by the model who posed for the figure. William Barnes was the Rector of Somerton from 1875 to 1923. The window was installed in the church on 29 September 1893.
St Cynfarch and St Mary	Llanfair Dyffryn Clwyd, Denbighshire	1893	John Dando Sedding was involved in some restoration work for this church from 1870 to 1872. Whall was responsible for the middle light of the window in the westernmost position on the South side of church. This window was made by James Powell & Sons and designed by Whall and dates from 1893. The three-light window has outer lights mainly of quarries, some of which are medieval, with a few other medieval fragments. The central light depicts the seated figure of Christ with three children, and has further quarries above and below. The work was entitled "Christ with Children". The dedication on the window reads-"To the memory of Helen Louisa Gertrude infant daughter of Basil M. Jones MA Vicar of this parish and Emily his wife 13 June 1890." Apart from this dedication the window also carries the text "He shall gather the Lambs with His arm" (Isaiah 40:11).
St Augustine	Archway Road, Haringey, London	1895	For this John Dando Sedding church, Whall executed a watercolour painting for the Lady Chapel altar; a rare excursion from his usual stained glass work. The watercolour depicts "The Annunciation".
Holy Trinity	Bothenhampton, Dorset	1895	There are two Holy Trinity Churches in Bothenhampton, the "old" church and the "new" church. Holy Trinity Old Church in Bothenhampton, Dorset, England was built in the 14th century. It has been designated by English Heritage as a Grade I listed building, and is now a redundant church in the care of the Churches Conservation Trust. It was declared redundant on 1 April 1971, and was vested in the Trust on 23 October 1972. The "new" church was designed and built by the English Arts and Crafts architect, Edward Schroeder Prior in 1890. Prior was an Arts and Crafts architect. The church has a front panel in painted gesso by William Richard Lethaby. Whall was responsible for the 1895 window in the church although there is every possibility that Lethaby also played some part in the creation of this window. In his series "The King's England" and the volume dealing with Dorset, Arthur Mee wrote regarding the East window- "The window is specially interesting to craftsmen because it was one of the first glazed with a new kind of glass known in the craft as Early English glass, devised by Professor Prior, who with Christopher Whall raised the standard of our modern stained glass craft. One of the lights in the window was shown at an exhibition in London as an example of this new glass".
St Clement	Boscombe, Hampshire	1894	This Grade I listed Victorian Gothic church by John Dando Sedding (1838–1891) has two windows by Whall each of two-lights, these supplied through James Powell & Sons. One depicts the "Resurrection" and the other "Christ appearing to the disciples by the Sea of Tiberius". The windows were a memorial to Father Purton, the church's second vicar. They have a brown and silver wash effect. This was Sedding's first major church and dates from 1871-3 although the tower was added after Sedding's death and was designed by Henry Wilson.
St Martin	Marple. Cheshire	1892 to 1896	St Martin's Church is a Grade II listed building and was built in 1869-70 for Maria Ann Hudson of Brabyns Hall. The church was designed by John Dando Sedding. The Lady Chapel was added in 1895-6 and was designed by Henry Wilson. Whall painted an "Annunciation" for the reredos in the Lady Chapel and with Wilson he designed various decorations and furnishings for that chapel. In the same church Whall was responsible for two West and South West windows in 1892 and 1899. Whall also painted a gesso panelled ceiling in the Lady Chapel, this work being carried out in around 1895-96. This included trees, animals and birds including flying martins. The 1892 two-light window was commissioned through James Powell & Sons and has St Martin in one light. The 1899 window depicts Christ appearing to the disciples by the Sea of Tiberius.
St Mary's Church, Berry Pomeroy	Berry Pomeroy, Devon	1897 and 1908	In 1897 Whall designed the church's East window and in 1908 worked on two Chancel windows. One entitled "The Elders" was erected in memory of the Reverend H.S.Prinsep. See image of "Nativity" in gallery below.
St Mary	Marston, Lincolnshire	1897	The church has an Early English tower. The Chancel was restored by Charles Kirk in the 1880s. The church is a Grade I listed building. Whall's two-light window in the South Aisle West celebrates the 60th anniversary of Queen Victoria's rule. The left-hand light shows a mother with two children and the right-hand light shows a child sitting on Christ's lap. Inscription in left-hand light reads "Suffer the little children to come unto me" and that in the right-hand light reads "For such is the Kingdom of Heaven." At the foot of the left-hand light is a crown and the date 1837, and at the foot of the right-hand light is V.R.I. and the date 1897. See image in gallery below.
St John the Baptist	Fawley Chapel, Herefordshire		Whall designed a window for this church.
St Denis	Silk Willoughby, Lincolnshire	1897	Whall worked on a five-light window in this church, this in memory of the Revd McKnight who was the St Denis Rector from 1879 to 1896. In The Buildings of England: Lincolnshire by Nikolaus Pevsner and John Harris, they say about this window "identical to one at Berry Pomeroy in Devon, The background details-bunches of grapes, wicker fence etc have a particular freshness".
All Saints	Dogmersfield, Hampshire	1898	All Saints has a window by Whall which shows a representation of "The Annunciation".
St Luke	Milland, Sussex	1899 and 1904	Whall designed two windows for this church. The first in the South Aisle is dated 1899 and that in the North Aisle dates from 1904. A photograph of the 1899 window is shown in the gallery below. In the 1899 window the subjects were David, St George and Jonathan.
St James	Pensax, Worcestershire	1899	In their volume on Worcestershire, Nikolaus Pevsner and Alan Brooks wrote of Whall's Pensax windows- "Excellent East and Chancel North windows".
St Andrew	Farnham, Surrey	1899	Whall executed a small two-light window in the South Transept entitled "Playful Angels". This is a Grade I listed late Norman/Early English church. In this church is a plaque noting that it was there that Augustus Toplady wrote the hymn "Rock of Ages". The window commemorates the mother of Harold Falkner, the Farnham architect..
St Peter and St Paul	Sustead, Norfolk	1899	Windows by Whall can be seen in this church. They depict the stories of the Good Samaritan and the Prodigal Son.
St Peter the Apostle	Walton-on-the-Hill, Surrey		Whall designed a two-light window for this church. In the right hand light is the figure of St George and in the left hand light an angel offers the "Crown of Life" to St George.
St Martin	Preston, Hertfordshire	1900	This church dates to 1900 and was designed by Thomas Carter. Whall completed a three-light window in 1900 on the theme of the "Jesse Tree". This is the East window which was erected in memory of Thomas Warrin who died in 1888.
St Mary	Haversham, Buckinghamshire	1901	Whall completed a three-light East window for this church dedicated to the Rev.Arthur Bruce Frazer who had been the Rector from 1856 to 1889. The central light shows Christ giving a blessing and the other two lights show St Peter and Saint Paul. There is a representation of "The Last Supper" at the bottom of the window. St Thomas looks most furtive and is given a black halo!
St Peter and St Paul	Chipping Warden, Northamptonshire	1902	Whall was responsible for the East window which features the Adoration of the Wise Men and various scenes from the lives of St Peter and St Paul. It was donated by Anne Douglas in memory of her parents.
St Peter and St Paul	Horndon-on-the–Hill, Essex	1901	The church of St Peter and St Paul, Horndon on the Hill is a Grade I listed building, situated on top of a hill, possibly on the site of a Saxon church. The present building dates from the 13th century. It has an Arts and Crafts interior by C. R. Ashbee and W. D. Caroe. At the West end of the North Aisle is a window designed by Whall featuring a depiction of the church.
St Ethelbert	Herringswell, Suffolk	1902	Church rebuilt by Arthur Blomfield in 1869-70 when the existing church was destroyed by fire. This church has a remarkable collection of glass by Arts and Crafts artists including three stained glass windows by Whall. These include "The Good Shepherd" of 1902 and the "Resurrection". "The Good Shepherd" is the East window and depicts Christ as the Good Shepherd, with quotations from Psalm 23 in the surrounding scenes. The window was commissioned by Mr.Leonard Davies in memory of his brother Herbert Davies and the black-faced sheep in the scenes were drawn by Whall's sister-in-law, Alice Chaplin, who was sculptor to Queen Victoria. It is recorded that the sheep depicted are exact portraits of sheep in the pedigree flock owned by Mr.Davies. The Whall window on the South side of the church is that depicting the "Resurrection". Note the symbolic "fish nimbus" which surrounds the figure of Christ. Whall also designed the window at the back of the choir, this in memory of the late Dr.Image, the uncle of Selwyn Image, a fellow stained glass artist and friend of Whall. Also in St Ethelbert is the window titled "Come unto Me, all ye that are weary and heavy laden, and I will give you rest" this done by Jasper Brett, a pupil of Christopher Whall. The church also has two stained glass windows which contain no figures but are studies of Herringswell in Spring and Autumn. They are by the artist James Clark The church also has a window by Paul Woodroffe another pupil of Whall.
St Margaret	Lowestoft, Suffolk	1903	The West window in the North Aisle of St Margaret's church features Evangelists. This window was moved from St Peter's church.
St Michael	Macclesfield, Cheshire	1903	A three-light window in the Nave South East area features "Christ in Majesty" in the centre light with St Peter (with key) and Mary Magdalene in the side lights. This window is dedicated to George Woodhouse.
St Michael	Ledbury, Herefordshire	1905	A three-light traceried window has St Michael and Dragon in the central light and "Fortitude" and "Soul's journey" depicted in the other lights. This church also has a fine window by Veronica Whall from the 1930s. This features a horsed St Martin of Tours cutting off part of his cloak for a beggar. According to legend whilst St Martin was still a soldier at Amiens he experienced the vision that became the most-repeated episode from his life. He was at the gates of Amiens with his soldiers when he met a poorly dressed beggar and he was sufficiently moved to cut his own military cloak in half and shared it with the beggar. That night he dreamed of Jesus wearing the half-cloak Martin had given the beggar and in his dream he heard Jesus say to the angels: "Here is Martin, the Roman soldier who is not baptised; he has clad me."
St Mary	Doddenham, Worcestershire		The Whall window in St Mary's was described by Alan Brooks and Nikolaus Pevsner as "very good"
St Mary	Ware, Hertfordshire	1905	There are two Whall windows in this church. One dates from 1905 and is of three-lights. This window remembers five men who died in the Boer War and celebrates the safe return of another. The window depicts St George, St Michael and St Alban. The 1908 window is of five-lights and depicts "Christ in Majesty", with various Saints around Him. Writing about the 1908 window, Pevsner states "Inspired by the Pre-Raphaelites but refreshingly different from the ordinary run of early C20 windows"
St Oswald	Ashbourne, Derbyshire	1905	This church has a spire of 212 feet (65 metres) referred to by George Eliot as the "finest single spire in England". The church was consecrated in 1241 and is dedicated to St Oswald, the King of Northumbria, who died in 642 A.D. In the 1870s Sir Gilbert Scott carried out some restoration work which includes some choir stalls. There is much stained glass in the church including a Whall window dating to 1905. It was given to the church by Mr and Mrs. Peveril Turnbull of Sandybrook Hall and it commemorates their daughters, Monica and Dorothy, who died in a local fire in 1901. Monica is depicted in the window as St Barbara and Dorothy as St Dorothy of Cappadocia. See image in gallery below courtesy Sue Hasker.
St Alban	Hindhead, Surrey		Whall completed a three-light window for this church entitled "The Good Shepherd". The centre light shows Christ and in the right and left hand lights there are various images of sheep.
Trinity House Almshouses/The Newarke	Leicester, Leicestershire	1905	These almshouses were founded in 1331 by Henry Earl of Lancaster and Leicester and were rebuilt in 1901. The original almshouses were known as the "Hospital of Annunciation of the Virgin Mary". They were for a warden, 4 chaplains and 50 poor and infirm people, 20 of whom were to be resident there. By 1354 the number of resident poor people had doubled to 40. The almshouse survived the dissolution and was renamed Trinity hospital in 1614. Whall executed an East window for the Chapel.
St Saviour	Folkestone, Kent	1901	Whall designed two windows for this church.
St Mary	Kemsing Kent	1905	St Mary's contains several Arts and Crafts pieces many by Henry Wilson. There is a stained glass window representing the "Transfiguration" dating from 1905, this a work of cooperation between Wilson and Christopher Whall.
Holy Trinity and St Thomas of Canterbury	Ettington, Warwickshire	1906	Whall's composition depicts Christ the Good Shepherd surrounded by various sheep.
All Saints	Brantingham, Yorkshire	1906	Whall completed a window in All Saints' South Chancel.
Church of St Saviour-on-the-Cliff.	Shanklin, Isle of Wight	1906	The church dates from 1869 and was designed by the architect Thomas Hellyer. It has a Whall window which is a three-light window and covers the "Nativity".
All Saints	Lindfield, Sussex	1906	Whall was responsible for the third window in the South Chapel. It depicts "Justice and Prudence"
St Peter and St Paul	Upton upon Severn, Worcestershire	1905/6	The "new" church in Upton was finished in 1879, and was built after the 'old' church was deemed to be in a bad state of repair and not big enough to serve the growing town's population. Arthur Blomfield drew up the plans for the "new" church and the site was donated by Mr G E Martin who owned the big house which was already on the site chosen; this was later to become the Rectory. The church has a four-light West window by Whall. The stone tablet in the church commemorating the donor of the window was carved by Eric Gill
St Margaret	Bagendon, Gloucestershire	1906	The present church was started around 1100 and remodelled in the Perpendicular style in the 15th century. Saxon and Norman fragments are still visible. The bell tower was originally divided into two small chambers to be used by visiting priests. Whall was responsible for the 1906 North Chancel window. This is known as the "Agnes Haines Memorial" and shows St Mary and St John at the foot of the Cross. St John is receiving Christ's injunction to treat Mary as his mother. The window includes Christ's words from the Cross- "Mulier ecce filius tuus … ecce mater tua/. Woman, behold thy son! [Son] behold thy mother!" Jesus bids John to take care of his mother.
St Mary the Virgin	Lynton, Devon	1907	Whall designed a single lancet window for the North wall of the Lady Chapel of this church. The window shows the Virgin Mary with her mother Saint Anne.
St John the Baptist	Burford, Oxfordshire	1908	Wall's three-light window in the South Transept shows scenes of St John's life in the left and right windows, and the centre light depicts the Revelation of St John.
Church of the Holy Cross	Avening, Gloucestershire	1908	Whall executed two traceried windows for this church each of two lights. The first, the theme of which was Christ's resurrection from the tomb, was commissioned in his memory by the children of Robert Calcutt of Avening Lodge. The first of the two lights shows Jesus standing in a yellow mandoria which has a spiky exterior as though formed from rock crystals. In His left hand he carries the banner of the resurrection, a red cross on a white background while His right hand signals a blessing. To His left is a branch of a tree bearing red fruit (possibly pomegranates, a symbol of resurrection). The second light shows an angel kneeling before Christ. The second two light window also remembers Robert Calcutt and this window was dedicated by his widow. The theme of these two lights is the birth of Christ. The first light features the Star of the Nativity on the right side against a blue background and beneath this are three angels. At their feet is the baby Jesus who lies on straw. The second light features Mary who kneels on straw in front of Jesus. Behind her cattle look over a wooden barrier and above them is the snow-covered stable roof with icicles hanging from it. Two images are shown in the gallery below.
All Saints	Killington, Cumbria	1907 to 1908	Whall produced All Saints' East window between 1907 and 1908. The subject was the appearance of Christ to the assembled disciples after His Resurrection. "Christ appears after the Resurrection, ringed in fire, to his gathered followers. Outside a starry night and angels".
St Paul's Church	Over Tabley, Cheshire	1908	This church was built in 1853 and has two stained glass windows by Whall in its nave. One window is a two-light window dating from 1908 and deals with "Christ's charge to Peter" and "Paul bidding farewell to the Elders at Ephesus". The second window also features St Peter and St Paul.
St Mary	Bleasby, Nottinghamshire	1910	Known as the "Magnificat" window and the easternmost window in the south wall of the nave, this window is a memorial to Henry Lewis Williams, who was the vicar at St Mary's for twenty-two years, from 1888 to 1910. It has three lights with St Mary with the child Jesus in the central light. The two side lights feature angels playing musical instruments. The principal inscription on the window is the opening words of the Magnificat: "My soul doth magnify The Lord and my spirit rejoices in God my saviour". In the bottom right hand corner an inscription reads: "To the Glory of God, and in loving memory of Henry, Lewis Williams: for twenty-two years Vicar of this parish 1888–1910".
All Saints	Little Casterton, Rutland	1911 and 1919.	The East and West windows are by Whall and are in memory of former tenants of Tolethorpe Hall. The east window depicts St Hubert, "Christ in Majesty" and St Francis and is in memory of Hubert Francis Joseph Eaton. The west window features St George and dates to 1919. According to legend, St Hubert was an eighth-century nobleman who was converted to a religious life by the vision of a stag bearing a crucifix between its antlers, seen when hunting in an Ardennes forest on a Good Friday.
Holy Trinity Church	Wickwar. Gloucestershire	1911	Whall executed a four-light window for this church.
St Nicolas	Cranleigh, Surrey		A two-light Whall window in the south aisle of this church features St Catherine of Siena and St Elizabeth of Hungary.
St Andrew	West Stafford, Dorset	1912	Whall was responsible for the east window which was a memorial to Caroline Egerton, a daughter of Reginald Southwell Smith. The window saw a re-use of glass in the tracery partly from the former East window and partly from an even earlier window.
St John the Divine	Richmond, Surrey	1912	St John's was opened in 1831 and was originally a Chapel of Ease for St Mary Magdalene, Richmond ’s Parish Church. St John's was designed by Lewis Vulliamy for the Church Commissioners. Since the beginning of this century, St John's has been renowned for its standard of music and worship and amongst the congregation there have been famous names like T.S.Eliot and Dorothy L. Sayers. In 1905, Arthur Grove extended the church by adding the sanctuary and Lady Chapel and the latter includes a Whall window installed in 1912. In this window there are five images from the life of Mary; the Annunciation, Mary with Elizabeth, the Nativity, the presentation in the Temple and Christ, aged 12, preaching in the temple.
St Mary and All Souls	Whalley, Lancashire	1913	This church has a Whall window dating from 1913 and also has a window by Trena Cox. The Whall window is a three-light window and is in memory of Harriette Sawyer the wife of H.W.Worsley-Taylor KC of Moreton. Worsley-Taylor was a judge. The window portrays the Virgin and Child with angel in the central light (and a small rabbit).
St Michael and All Angels.	Bournemouth, Dorset	1914	Whall designed the West window in this church in 1914. This church, designed by Norman Shaw in 1873, has joined with St John's church as St John with St Michael. There is also a sculpture in the St Michael War Memorial Chapel by Sir George Frampton. Whall wrote a description of the West window which read- "The window is founded on the conception of the Angelic Hierarchies and the Nine Choirs into which they are divided, as set forth in the writings of Dionysius, the Areopagite, (St Denis) and the Homilies of St Gregory. The First Hierarchy of COUNSELLORS; consists of Cherubim, Seraphim and Thrones. The Second of GOVERNORS; consists of Virtues, Dominations and Powers. The Third of MINISTERS; consists of Principalities, Archangels and Angels," Whall explained that the width between lights necessitated an isolated form of treatment and that he endeavoured to tie the window together by placing a rainbow in the centre. "In sight like unto an emerald" as described in Revelations. Whall continued "The background is conceived as a suggestion of a battlemented structure: the "crystal battlements" of Milton or the "rampart of God's House" of Rossetti and is carried out chiefly in the crystal, slab glasses known as "Prior's Glass". In his notes Whall wrote of the Cherubim "Symbolizing Wisdom. Holds a globe which mirrors the Heavens." Of the Seraphim he wrote "Love and Adoration. On the Gospel side of the church, as having the greater dignity" and for Thrones. "Holding a Throne". For the Governors and Dominations Whall explains that the "sword and sceptre are in even balance" and for Powers we see "Evil in chains". For the Minsters and Principalities Whall depicts "Guardian Angels of the Kingdoms of this world" that are to become "The Kingdom of Our Lord and His Christ". It holds the vial which Whall has taken to symbolize the receptacle of the delegated trust, a well recognised allegory as e.g. St. Paul "We have this treasure in earthen vessels" (2 Cor.4.7) and the "vials" of the Revelations. It also holds the lily which may probably symbolize purity of rule, the Heavenly Government, incorruptible, set as a type and exemplar for earthly kingdoms to follow, Whall says that these symbols are traditional and found in ancient art. The Archangels are Gabriel and Michael and as Angels Whall depicts "The Guardian Angel, vested as for administering the Sacrament of Baptism, who points out to the Newly Baptized Infant the Journey of Life". Whall finished his notes "While studying, not for the first time, the English 15th century glass in the clerestory of Malvern Priory (a church also dedicated to St Michael and All Angels) the artist was delighted to discover, by the aid of field glasses, five out of the "Nine Choirs" of angels with their names still attached to them and with all the attributes and symbolism identical with that here employed and with that of the painted Norfolk screens from which the details had first been derived. The glass at Malvern has been much mutilated and rearranged, and many figures are missing, but it is quite evident that the "Nine Choirs of angels" must originally have formed the scheme of that lovely series of windows, and have been a subject familiar to Ancient English Art".
St Mary	Ashby Folville, Leicestershire	1913	Whall designed the East window for this church. It was commissioned by Herbert Hanbury Smith-Carington. The five main panels represent the Annunciation, the Visitation, the Presentation in the Temple, the Finding of Jesus in the Temple and the Incarnation. A rabbit is shown quietly feeding at the bottom of the central panel. See image in gallery below courtesy Mrs.Rosemary Holt.
Church of the Holy Cross	Sarratt, Hertfordshire	1913/1921/1923	Whall was responsible for the "Charity" window in this church. It is the East window in the North Transept. The window dates from 1923. The Church dates back to circa 1190. Whall was responsible for two other windows, "St Cecilia" and "Bringing the children to Christ". The "Charity" window comprises two lights featuring angels. There is a panel below each light and in the panel below the left hand light is a heart and below the words "Deus Caritas Est". "Bringing the Children to Christ" is the earliest of the three windows and was installed in the West of the tower in 1913. It is a two-light window and in the left hand light we see a mother with two children. They look towards the right hand light in which we see Jesus with a third child. In a roundel above the two main lights, two angels are shown and the inscription "In Heaven their angels do always behold the face of the Father." The window "St Cecilia" was installed in 1921 and is the South window, South Aisle. St Cecilia sits at a piano. The window was commissioned in her memory by the children of Emily Catherine Hamilton Ryley.
St Stephen	Brough, Nottinghamshire	1914	This church contains a tablet and a window in memory of Thomas Cecil Smith Woolley. They were dedicated at Evensong on Sunday 28 June 1914. The bronze tablet was designed by Sir George Frampton and the window by Christopher Whall. In Whall's two-light window, the Virgin Mary holds the Infant Christ who wafts His blessing to the Chalice held by St Hugh, in which Chalice, according to legend, a vision of the Infant Christ Himself had appeared to St Hugh. St Hugh was the Bishop of Lincoln from 1186 to 1200. For the first nine years of his thirty eight years of service, Woolley served under the Bishop of Lincoln. Brough was then transferred to Southwell. The Cathedral of the diocese of Southwell is the Church of the Blessed Virgin Mary which no doubt influenced Whall's decision that She should feature in the window. Some of the wells of Southwell were famous for having healing properties and Whall remembers these wells by drawing wavelike lines in the glass near the top of the Virgin Mary.
St John the Baptist	Pinner, Middlesex	1914	This church has a 1914 Screen at the West end by Charles Spooner and this has decorative glazing by Whall.
St Laurence	Corringham, Lincolnshire	1915	This church has a fine Norman Tower and was restored by Bodley and Garner between 1882 and 1884. Church contains a two-light window by Whall in the South Aisle which dates to 1915. The windows are dedicated to the memory of Mary Beckett of Somerby Hall who funded the 1882 to 1884 restoration of the church. The left hand light features "The Good Shepherd" and that on the right is thought to be a representation of the Virgin Mary.
St Bede's Chapel	Greenwich, Connecticut	1915	The chapel, on the campus of Rosemary Hall (an independent girls school), was designed by Theodore T Blake and described in the New York Times in 1909 as the "only example of pure Middle English Gothic architecture in America". The 16 foot stained window at the North end of the Chapel was designed by Christopher and Veronica Whall and installed in 1915. The window honours the Venerable Bede, the patron Saint of Education. The window comprises six main lights and fifteen pieces of tracery. From left to right the lights depict St Bede, St Anne, St Benedict, St Catharine of Sienna, St Gregory and St Francis of Assis. The figures occupy the upper, two sections with their names inscribed above and in the lower section under the saints name is a vignette of girls learning different subjects. These from left to right are Natural Sciences, Grammar, Discipline in the home, Arts, Music and Health and play. In the centre of the tracery is a depiction of some angels, surrounded by quarry glazed tracery pieces. In the lower, large tracery sections are angels holding titles of desirable traits; Vision (Visus) and Admiration (Admiratio), Speech (Oratio) and Prayer (Preces), Hearing (Auditus) and Praise (Laus) and Thought (Mens) and Loving (Spes Amor). Veronica Whall was responsible for the angels in the tracery.
All Souls	Ascot, Berkshire	1916	John Loughborough Pearson designed church dating to 1896-7 and completed by his son Frank. Work by Whall can be seen in the Baptistery. The window has six lights and has images of warrior saints in each lancet. Listed as a Whall and Whall window.
All Saints' Church	Brockhampton-by-Ross, Herefordshire	1902 to 1916	This is a church dating to 1901-2 and set in beautiful countryside high above the River Wye. Brockhampton lies between the historic city of Hereford and the market town of Ross-on-Wye. It is one of the few thatched churches in the country. The Church is open every day for visitors during daylight hours. The present church is a Grade I listed building. It was commissioned by Alice Foster in memory of her parents. In the late 1870s, Mr. Ebenezer Jordan of Boston, Massachusetts had purchased Brockhampton Court, now a retirement home, as a wedding present for his daughter, Alice, and her groom, Mr. Arthur Foster. Alice later commissioned architect, William Lethaby, to build her a parish church nearby as a memorial to her parents. William Lethaby was a leading light in the Arts and Crafts movement. The church contains many examples of Whall's work. Nikolaus Pevsner called this church "one of the most convincing and most impressive churches of its date in any country.". The East window was by Whall with representations of seven saints and two angels. In the top row we have firstly an angel, then a second angel and then St Michael. The middle section portrays St John the Baptist, St Peter and St Agatha and in the bottom section we have St Chad, St Edmund and St Elizabeth. Whall also executed a West window and the South Transept window in 1916, this featuring four angels, three of whom are playing instruments.
St Andrew	Steyning, Sussex	1918	Whall executed the second window in the South Aisle. It is a two-light window and features St Cuthman as both Shepherd and Builder.
Holy Trinity	Bracknell, Berkshire	1919	A quatrefoil by Whall can be seen in the South Transept, East side. It portrays St Theodore and was erected in memory of Henry Thompson Jones who served as a local schoolmaster for 27 years and died in 1917. There is another window in the North Aisle of two lights which features St Martin and St George and this was erected in memory of Lt.Lethbridge. This is said to be a 1900 work. Another single light window in the North Aisle West showing Christ with children and dating to 1906 is dedicated to the memory of Charlotte Emery who died in 1905.
Christ Church	Mount Barker, South Australia	1919	Whall's three-light window for the East side of this church depicts St Francis receiving the stigmata, Christ in Majesty and St Clare.
St Mary	Iwerne Minster, Dorset	1920	Whall completed the five-light East window for this church, this set in curvillinear tracery.
St Mary	Cheadle. Cheshire	1917	Part of Whall's East window depicts "Christ in Majesty". In this window Whall retained a piece of the original medieval glass- part of the Honford Coat of Arms.
St Nicholas	Barkston, Lincolnshire	1920	Church has a Whall window portraying the "Annunciation", this in the Chancel North.
All Saints	Saint-Raphaël, Var, France	1918	Whall designed the window in this church dedicated to George Nelson Hector (1830–1918) a long time resident of St Raphael. The theme is that Good will come out of Evil and that Eternal Justice will triumph over Wrong and Violence. In one light we see St George, the Champion of England, standing on the Vanquished Dragon. In the background we see cities of France in flames and below Christ stilling the troubled waters. In the other is St Michael, with the Heavenly Scales, weighing and assessing the righteousness of the cause. Here in the background the flames of Destruction give place to the "fiery tongues" of the Spirit of God and below the Spirit of God moves upon the face of the waters, bringing Order out of Chaos. In the panel of the "Spirit moving on the face of the waters" the figures below the Dove are the four Winds. Reading from left to right they are the North Wind shown in a drift of snowflakes, the South Wind in a glow of sunshine, the East Wind in a gloomy cloud and the West Wind in the green and gold of spring time. The window was dedicated in March 1921. This church, in a suburb of Saint Raphael, was designed in 1900 by Léon Sergent. At the time it served a community of rich British winter residents. However, when this clientele no longer worshipped regularly in Valescure, it was ceded to the Catholic church (in 1958). It is today L’Église de Tous les Saints, open every Sunday. Harry Stuart Goodhart-Rendel, an architect and one time President of the R.I.B.A inherited the church in 1913 on the death of his grandfather, Lord Rendel of Hatchlands. When the church was refurbished in the late 1920s, Colin Gill was commissioned to paint the frescoes in the chancel.
Church of St Gwyndaf	Llanwnda, Gwynedd	1922	For this church Whall designed a two-light window depicting St George standing on the dragon and St David with leeks behind and daffodils in the surround. The window is in the North wall of the North Transept. The dedication reads-"To the Glory of God and in loving memory of Thomas Jones, born 2nd June 1861, died in India January 17th 1919 buried in Tabor 24th February 1921. This window is erected by his brothers Sir Robert Armstrong Jones, Plas Dinas, Colonel J Lloyd Jones I.M.S. & David Fowden Jones, Eisteddfa Criccieth"
St Leonard	Middleton, Lancashire	1911 and 1923	Whall completed two windows for this church. In The Buildings of England. Lancashire: Manchester and the South-East Clare Hartwell and Nikolaus Pevsner describe the 1911 window thus "two gem-like windows by Christopher Whall. Grisaille, not clear glass, contrasted with intense colour; s.side, Fides, Amos, Spes 1911". For the 1923 window, a window of five-lights in the Assherton Chapel (South East) they wrote "The Ascension plus John the Baptist and St Michael, with a wonderfully moody eternal city in streaky purple."
St Mary	Burton Bradstock, Dorset	1923	In 1897 Edward Schroeder Prior was commissioned to carry out a general restoration. Prior was a leading figure in the Arts and Crafts Movement. The stained glass window in the North wall of the Nave is by Christopher Whall and was installed in 1923.
St Leonard	Wollaton, Nottinghamshire	circa 1924	Church has a two-light window which remembers Henry Charles Russell(1842–1922) who had served as Rector of the church from 1876 to 1922 and features St Francis with a whole collection of birds and St Nicholas with two children, one of whom holds a doll. See also mention of the War Memorial window in the section below. The dedication reads "To the Glory of God and in loving memory of Henry Charles Russell Rector of this Parish/1876-1922- I look for the Resurrection of the dead and the Life of the world to come". See image in gallery courtesy Mary and Malcolm Stacey.
All Saints	Sproughton. Suffolk	1924	Sproughton's church near Ipswich has some fine stained glass windows by both Ward & Hughes and Whall. Whall's window in the North Aisle includes a tall St Christopher flanked by other scenes completed by Whall's daughter Veronica, after his death. See image in gallery below courtesy Wisbey.
William Morris Gallery	Walthamstow. Outer London		Works by Christopher Whall can be found at the William Morris Gallery. These include three scenes from Genesis 1 which were designed by Christopher Whall and made by Saunders and Co. These were part of a scheme of windows made for St Etheldreda's Church in London in 1879.
St James	Bossington, Hampshire	1920	Three-light window completed in the South Nave depicts St George.
St Martin of Tours	Chelsfield, Outer London		Whall designed a two-light window in the South Chancel area featuring "Christ Resurrected". His daughter Veronica designed a two-light window for the church in 1925 this showing St Martin handing half his cloak to a beggar.
St Etheldreda	Hatfield, Hertfordshire	1920	Whall completed a North Aisle window which depicted three angels.
All Saints, Ashmont	Boston, United States of America	1907	Whall's first work for an American church is "The Risen Christ," a clerestory window with three lancets below and six smaller lights above. The left lancet is St Peter, the center lancet depicts the risen Christ, and the right lancet is St John the Evangelist. The lights above depict angel heads with feathers for bodies.
Church of the Advent	Boston, United States of America	1908	The designs involved were Whall's first ensemble for an American church. Five clerestory windows were involved. One depicts St Ignatius of Antioch representing the Syrian church. The other windows depict St Athanasius of Alexandria representing the African church, St Columba representing the Celtic church and St John of Chrysostom is the symbol for the Greek church. Finally St Ambrose of Milan represents the Latin church.

== Gallery ==
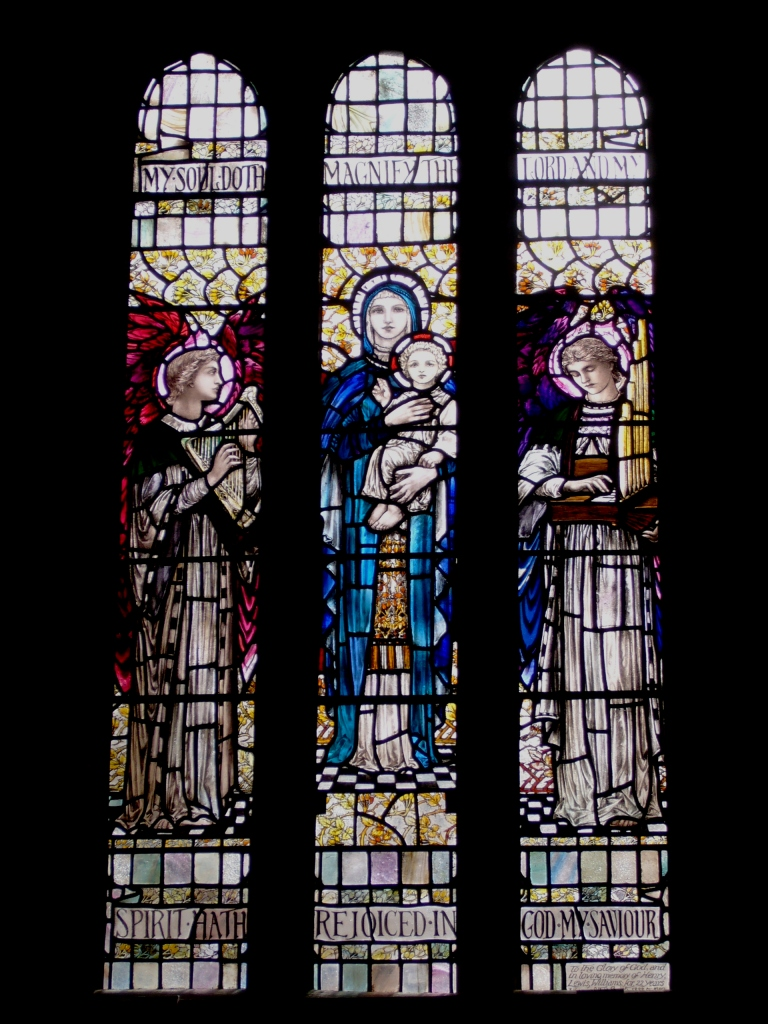
Window in Bleasby Church. Shown courtesy Mary and Malcolm Stacey.

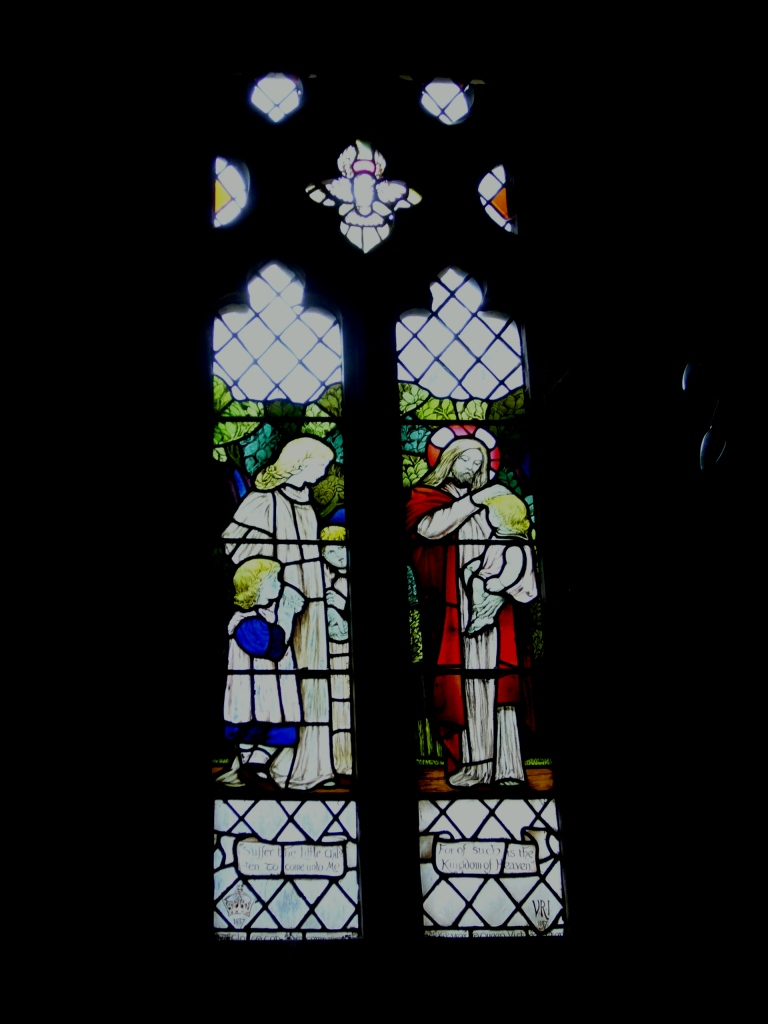
Window in St Mary's Marston.

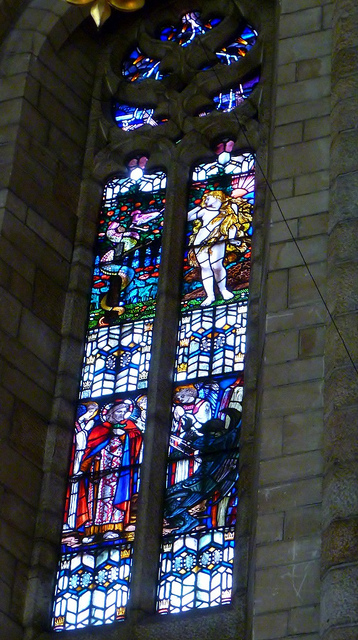
Window in Cape Town Cathedral. Shown courtesy Stewart Harris.

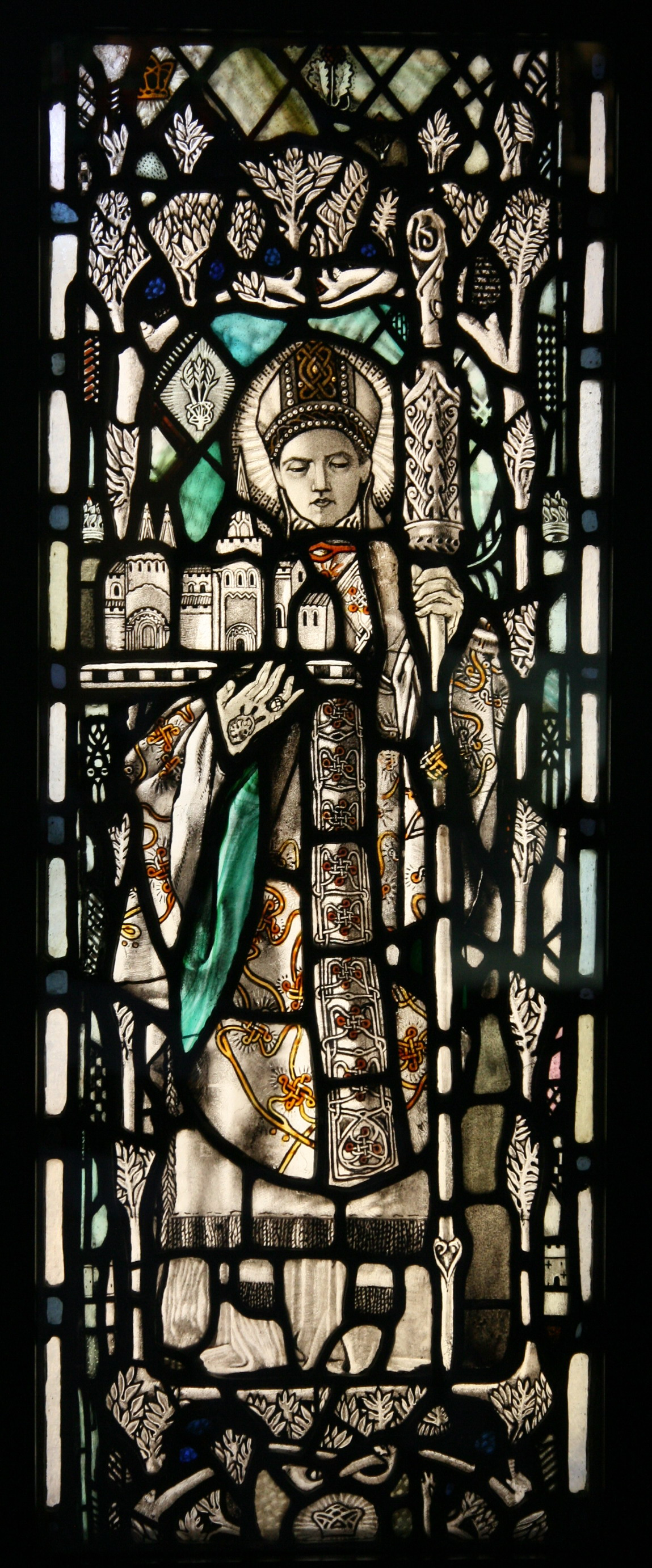
"St Chad" by Whall. Held in Victoria and Albert Museum

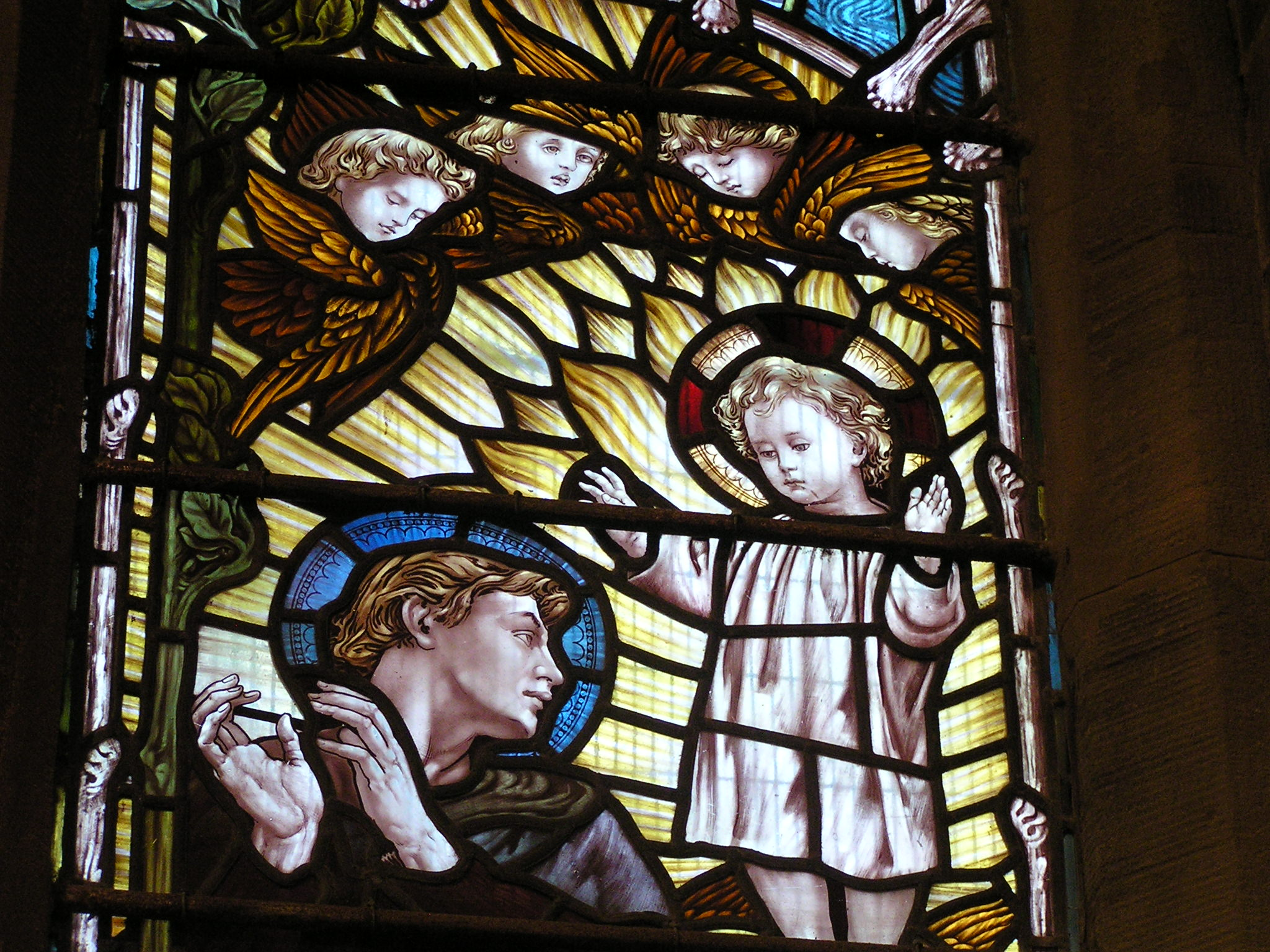
Whall's window in St Seiriol. Shown courtesy Peter Jones

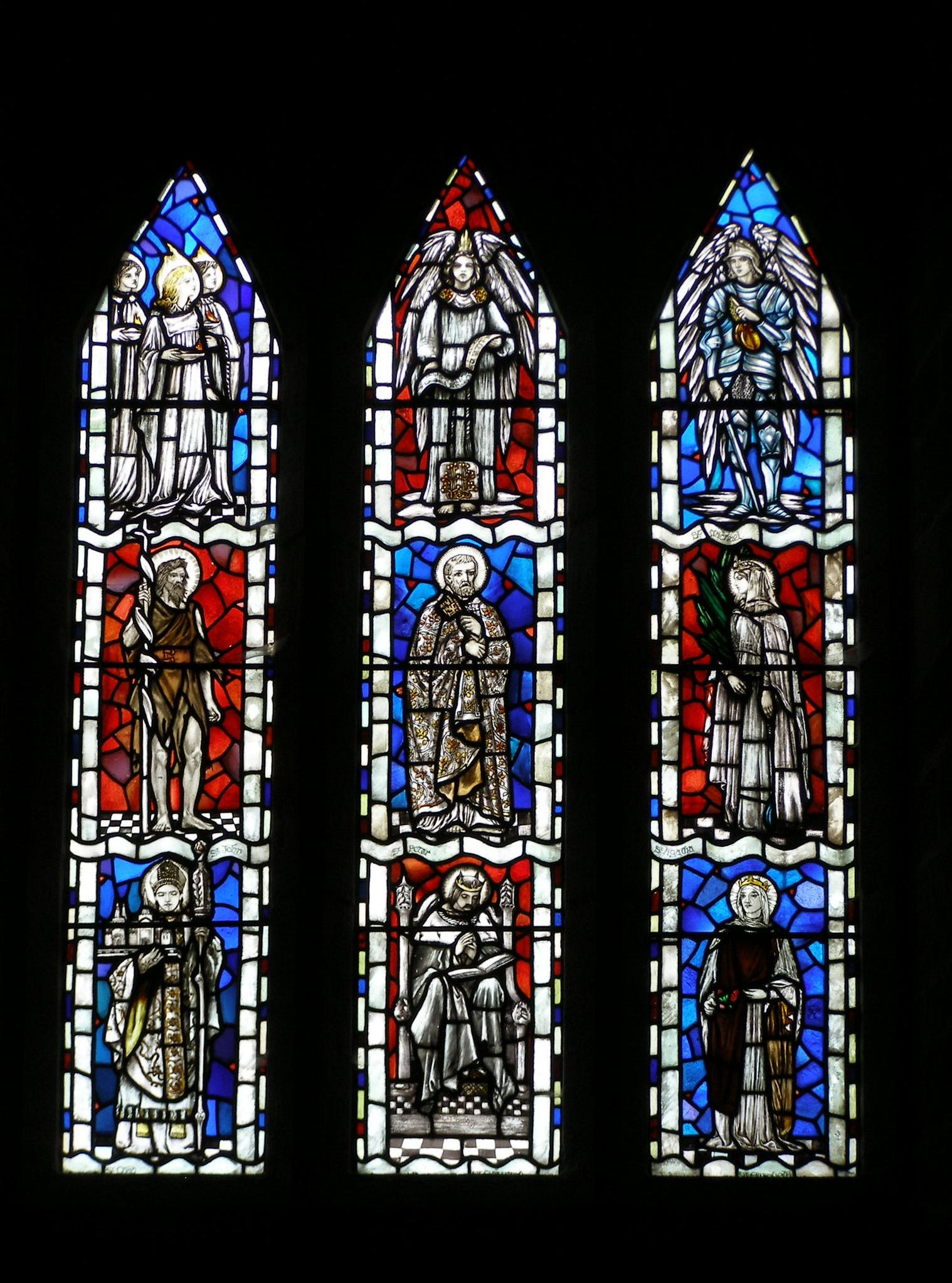
Whall window in All Saints Brockhampton.

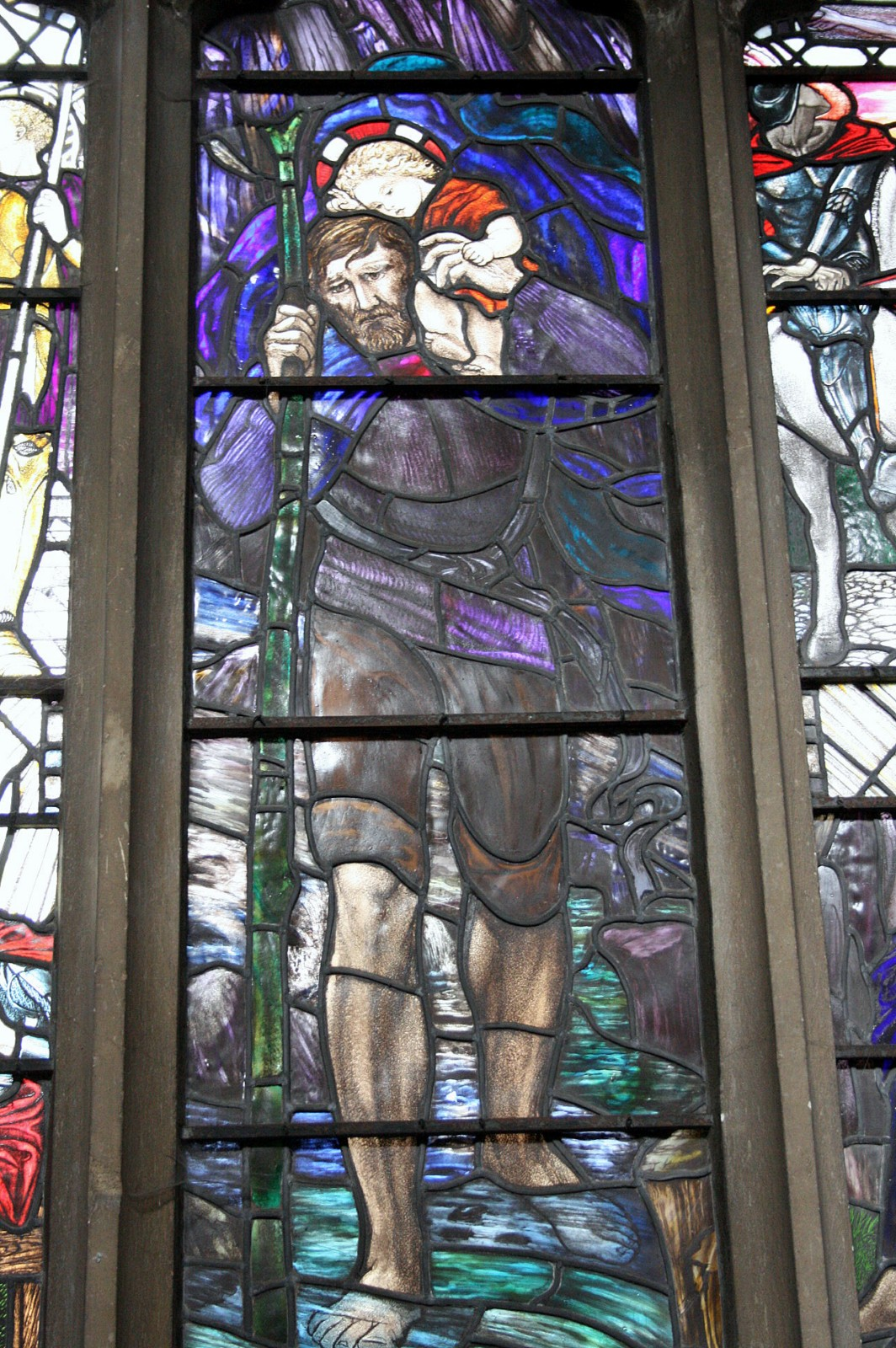
St Christopher in All Saints, Sproughton. Image shown courtesy Wisbey.

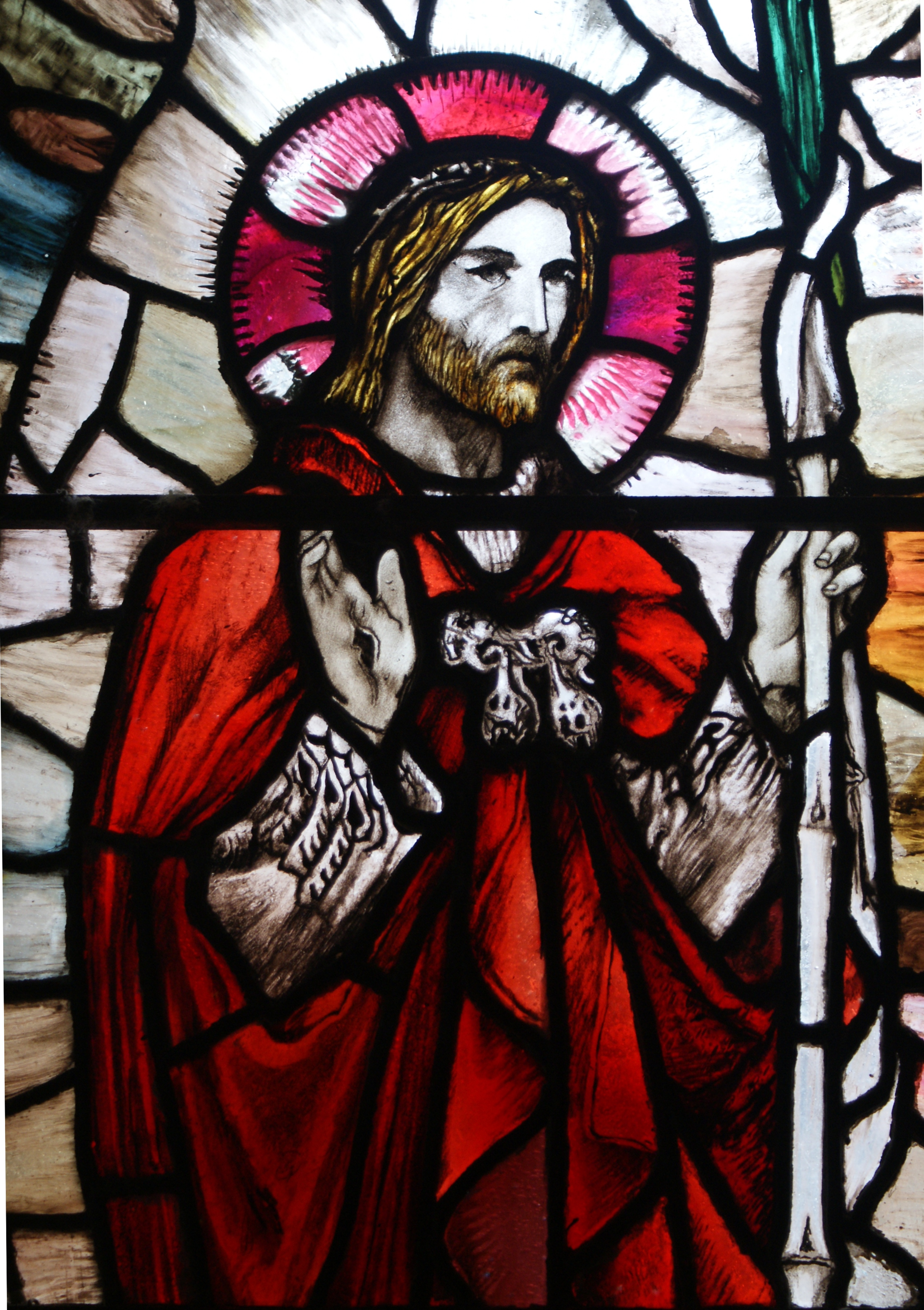
Part of "Resurrection" in St Ethelbert, Herringswell, Suffolk. Image shown courtesy Barking Tigs.

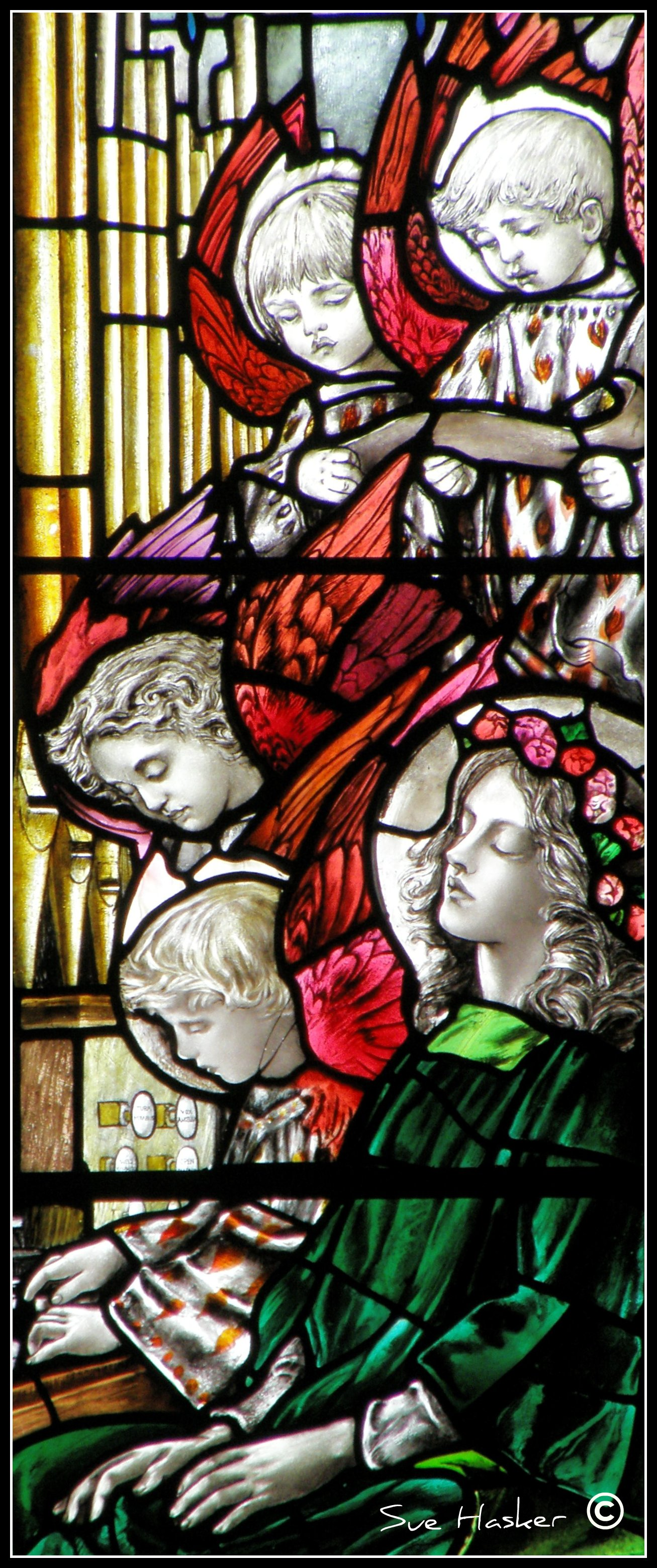
St Cecilia.St Oswald's Church.Ashbourne. Image courtesy Sue Hasker

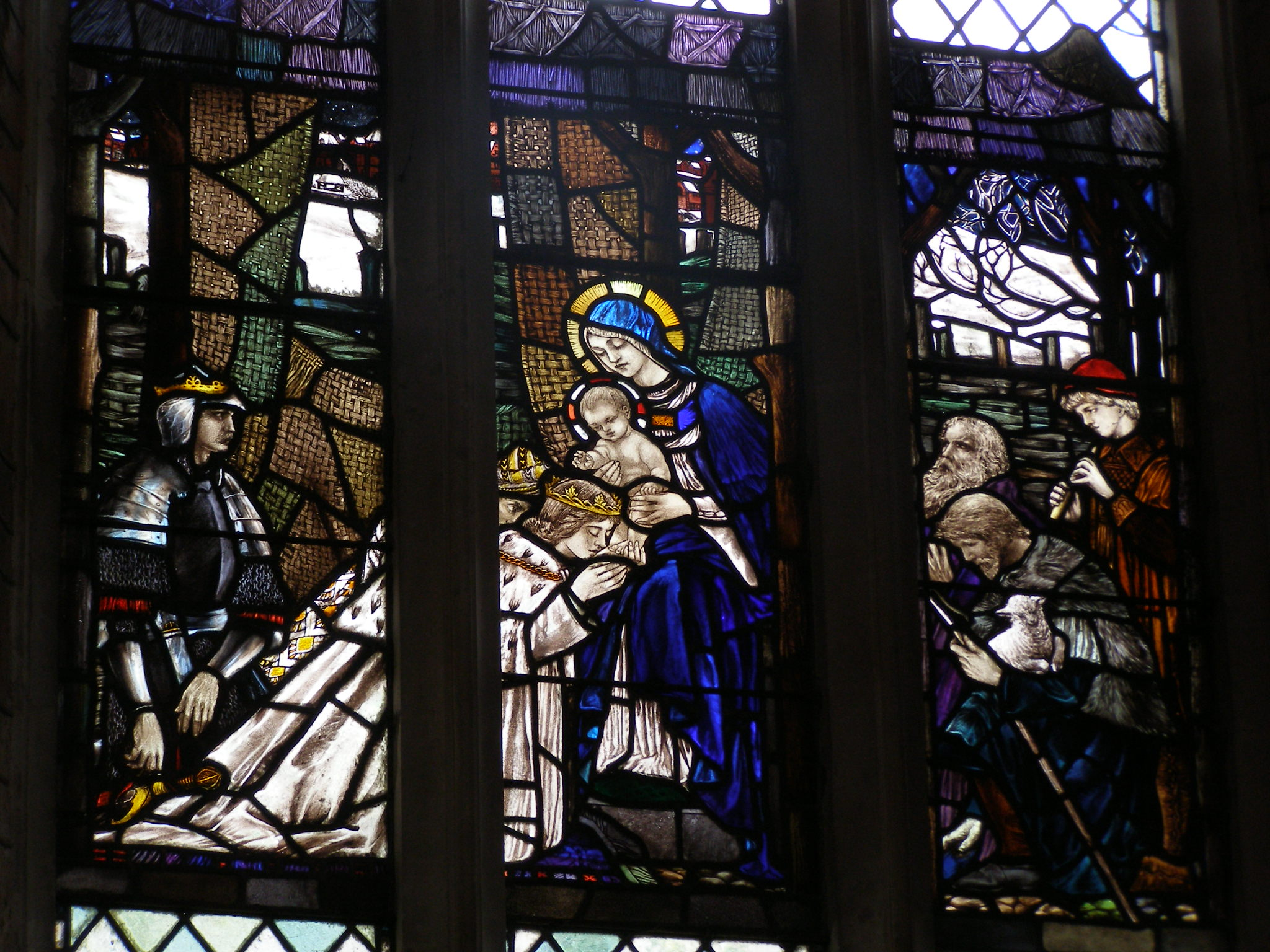
Nativity window at St Mary, Berry Pomeroy, Devon.

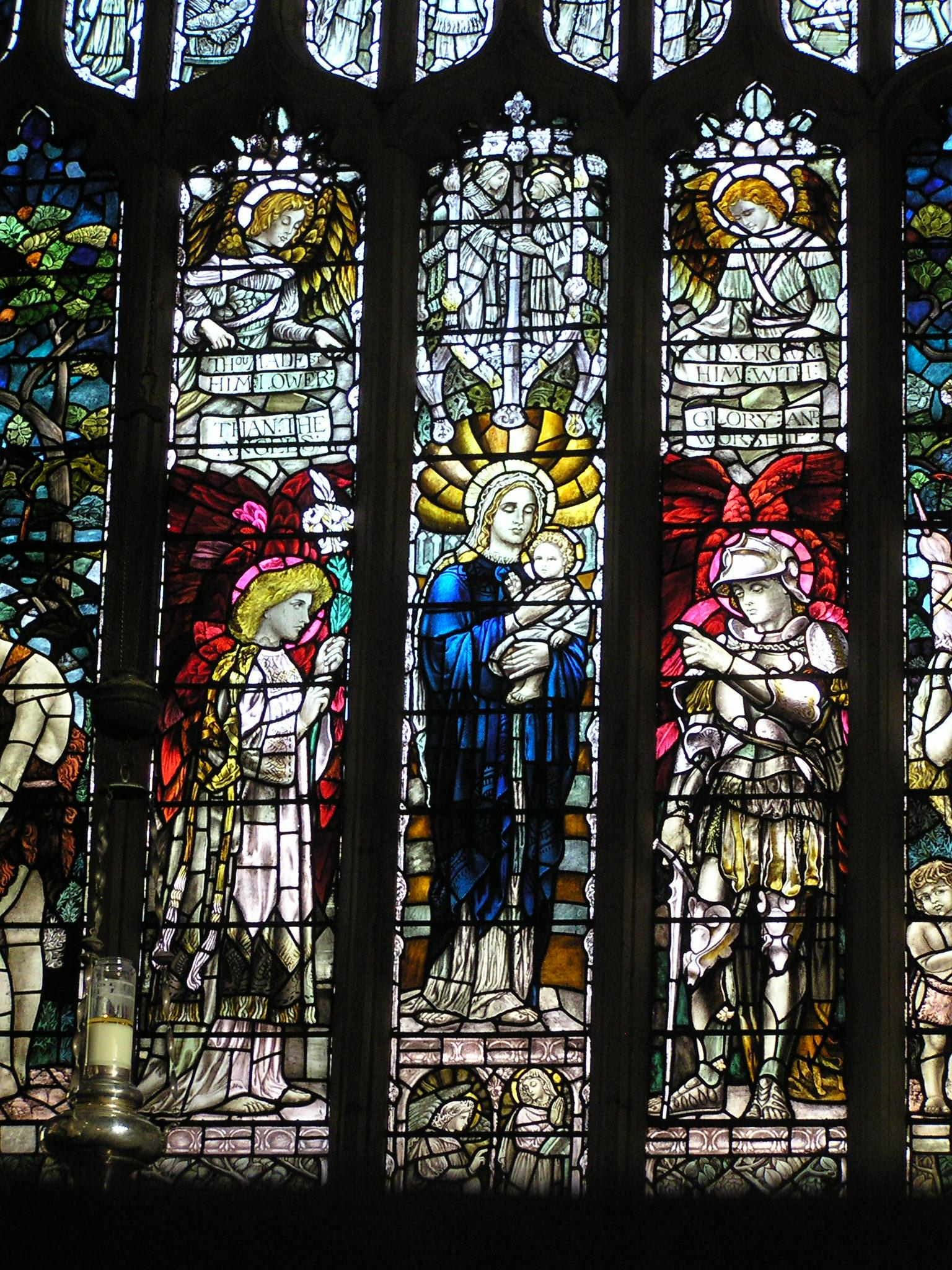
Whall's stained glass window in St Mary's Church, Stamford in Lincolnshire. Whall's first independent commission.

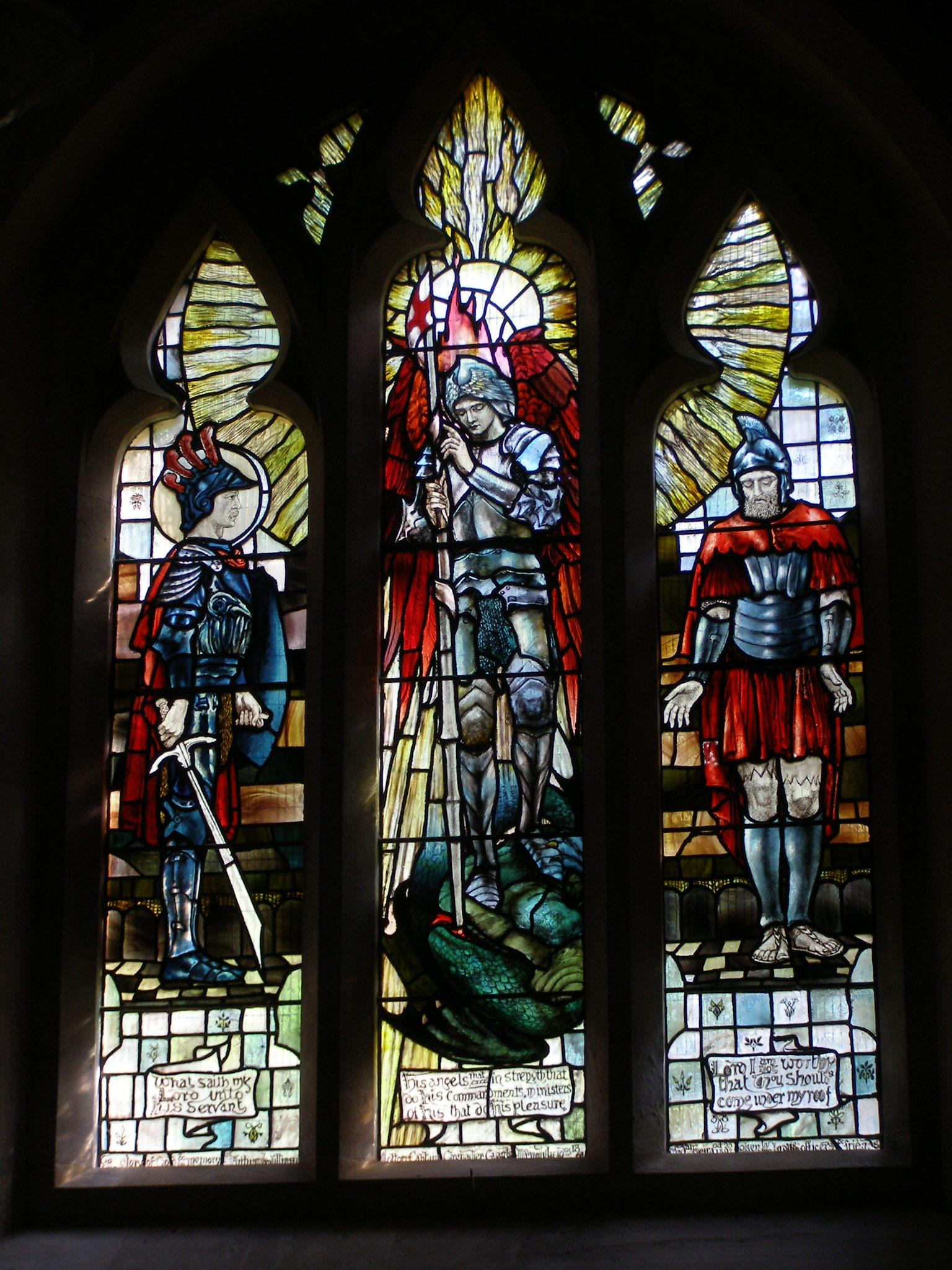
Whall's 1899 window in St Luke's Church. Milland in Hampshire.

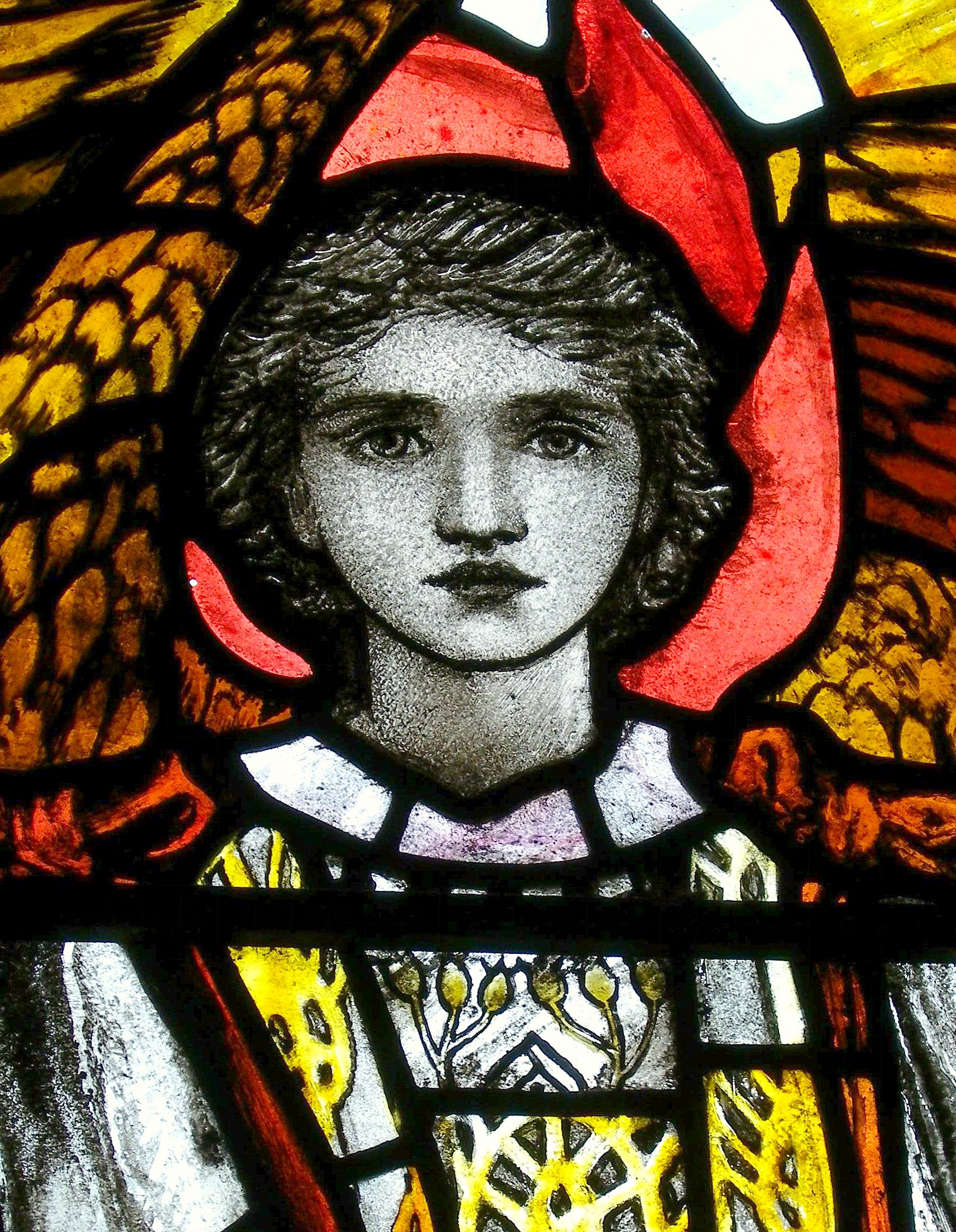
Detail from Whall window in St Ethelreda's Hatfield.

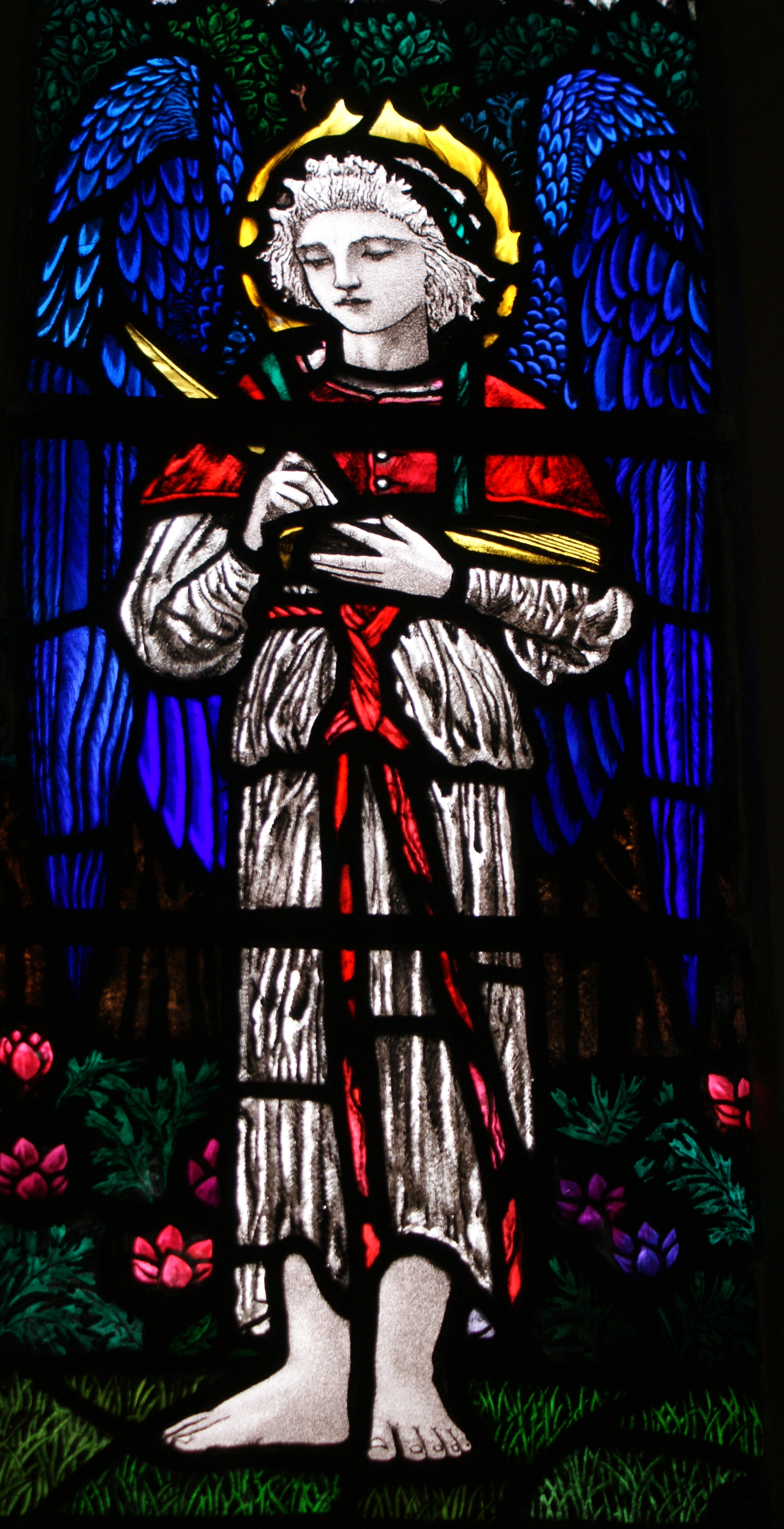
Part of Whall's "Charity" in Holy Cross. Sarratt.

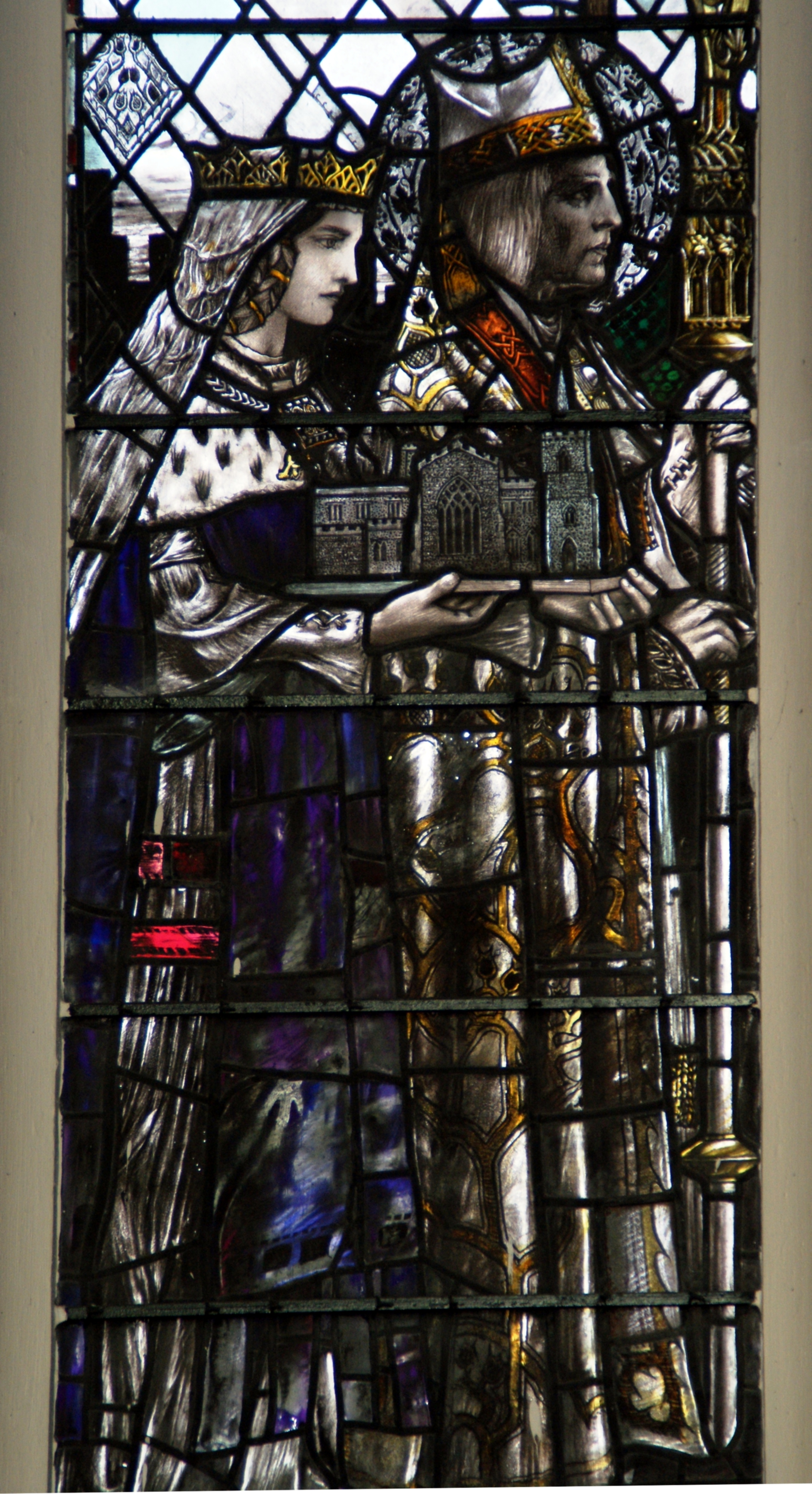
The lower light of the Te Deum window by Christopher Whall, St Mary the Virgin, Ware.

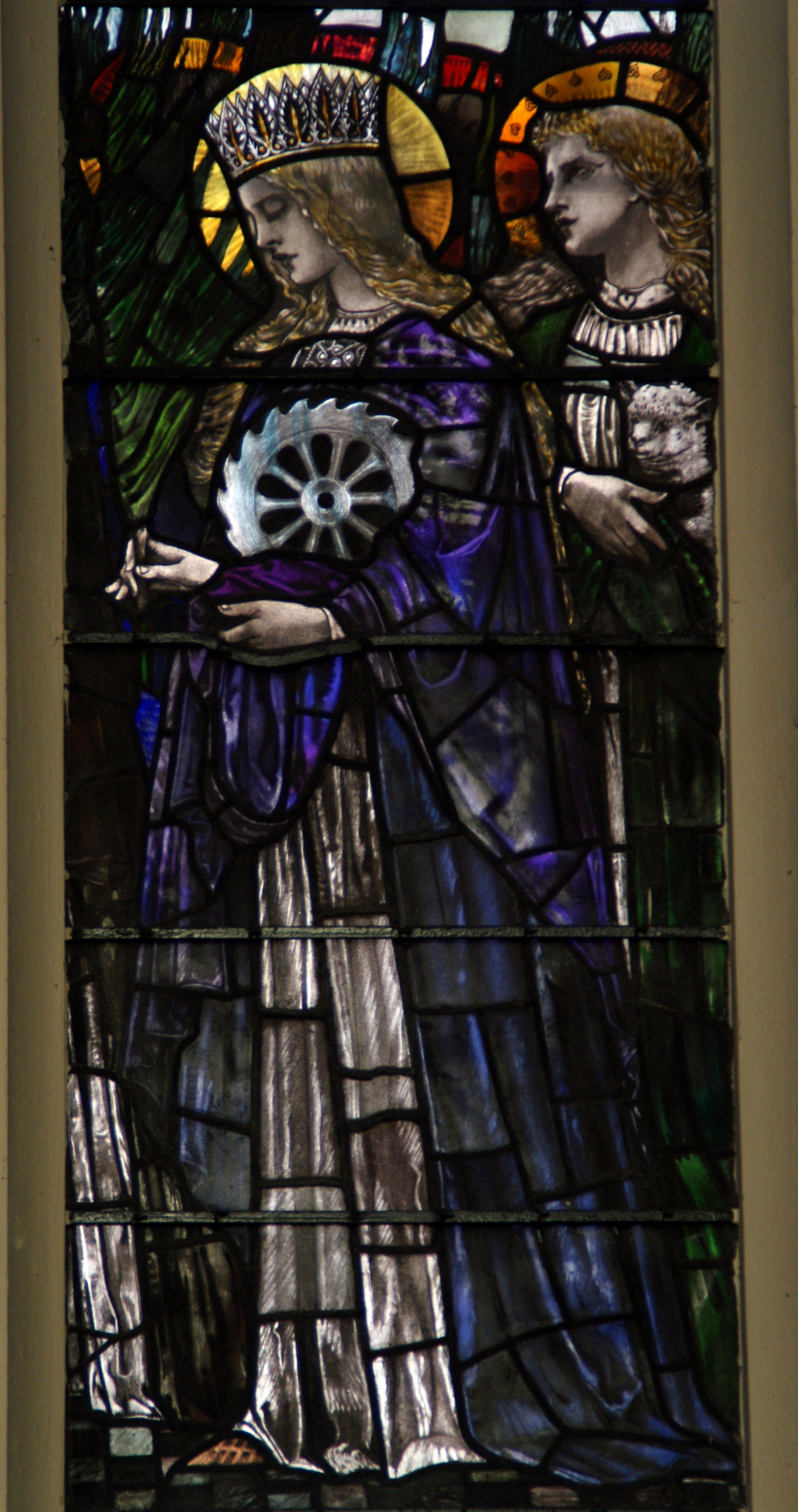
A section of Christopher Whall's Te Deum in St Mary the Virgin, Ware. Shows St Catherine of Alexandria, heading up the Noble Army of Martyrs.

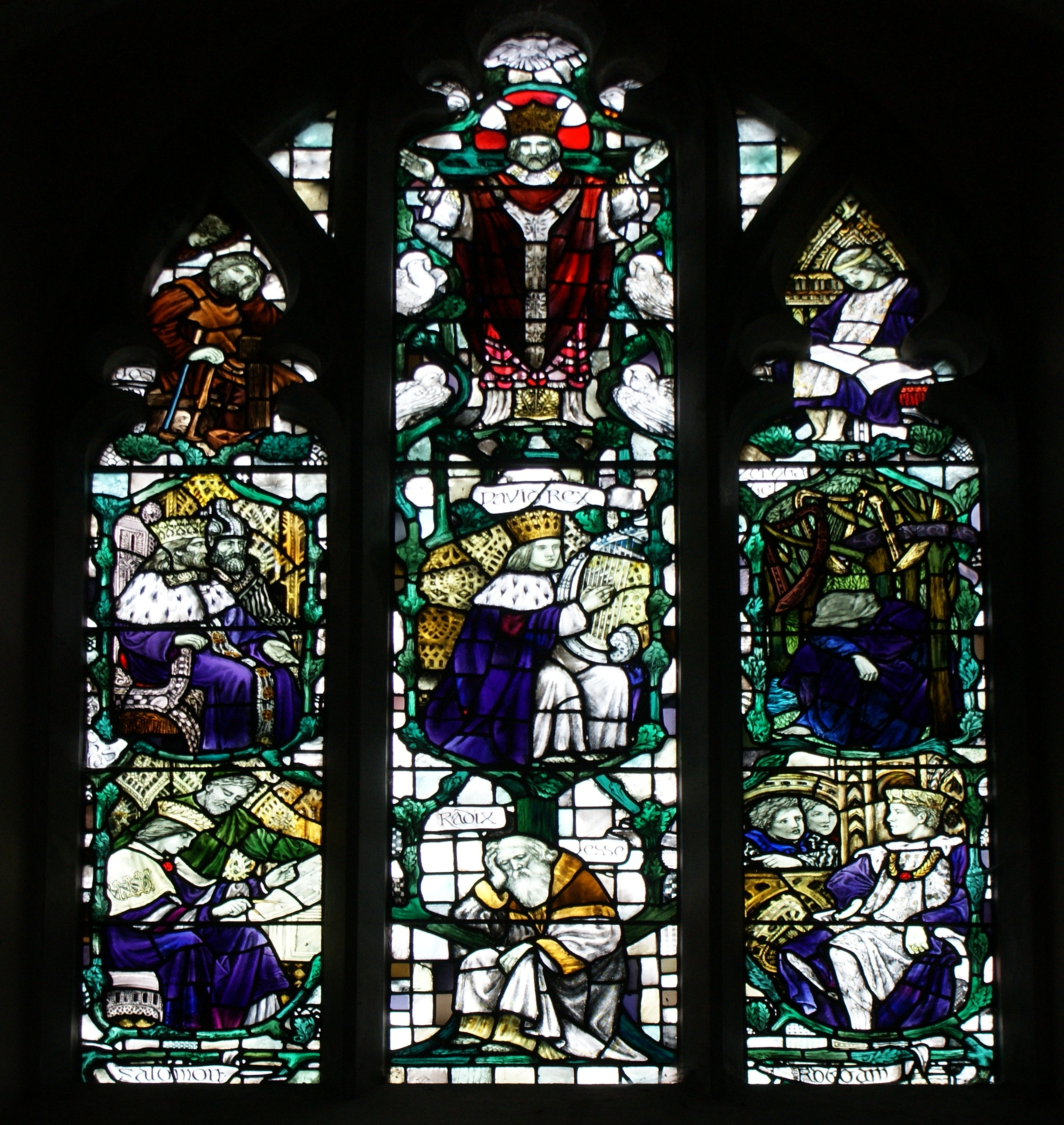
Tree of Jesse window in Preston, Hertfordshire Church.Image courtesy barking Tigs.

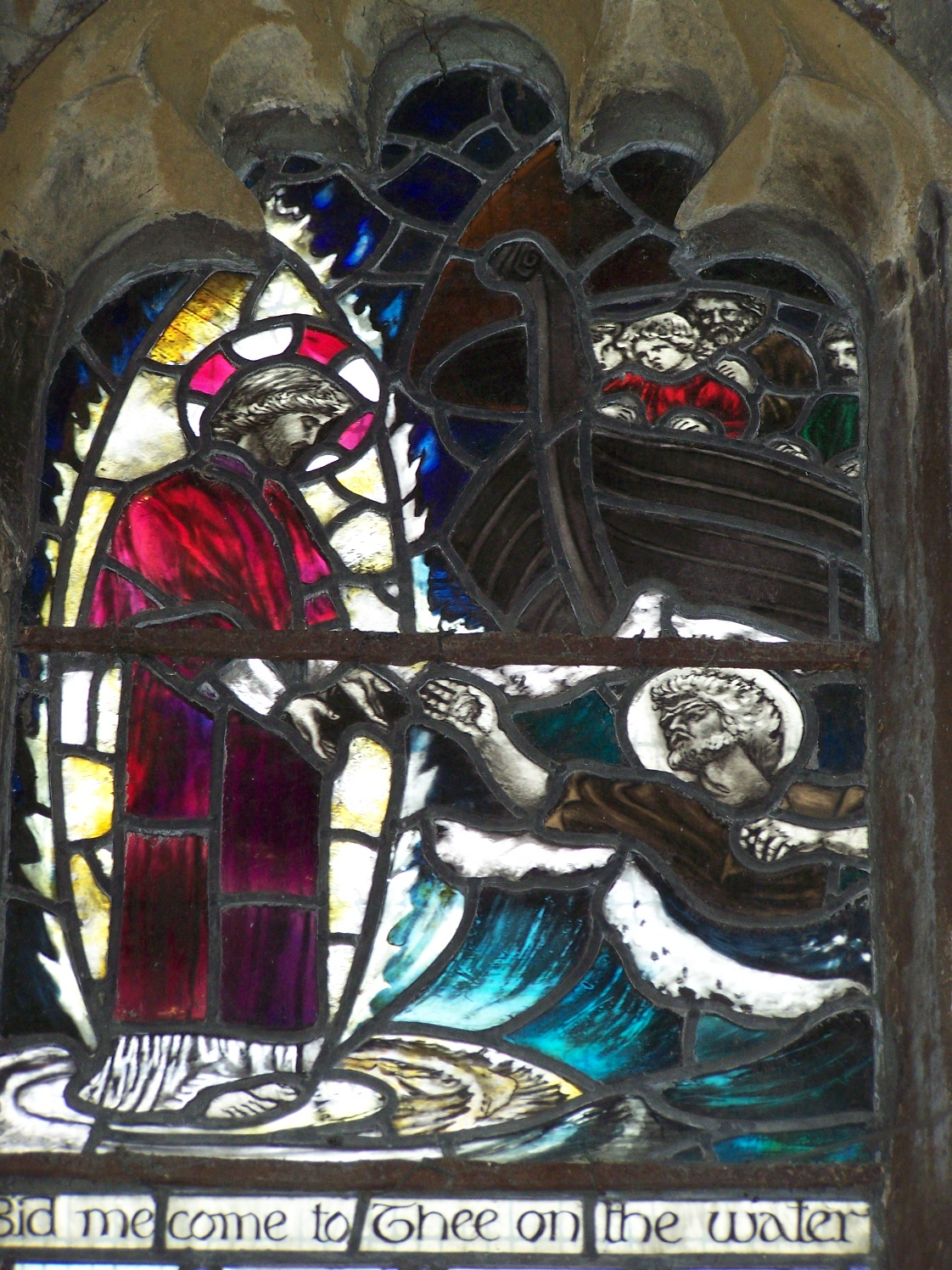
Part of window in St Peter and St Paul Church.Chipping Warden.Northamptonshire. Image courtesy jmc4-Church Explorer.

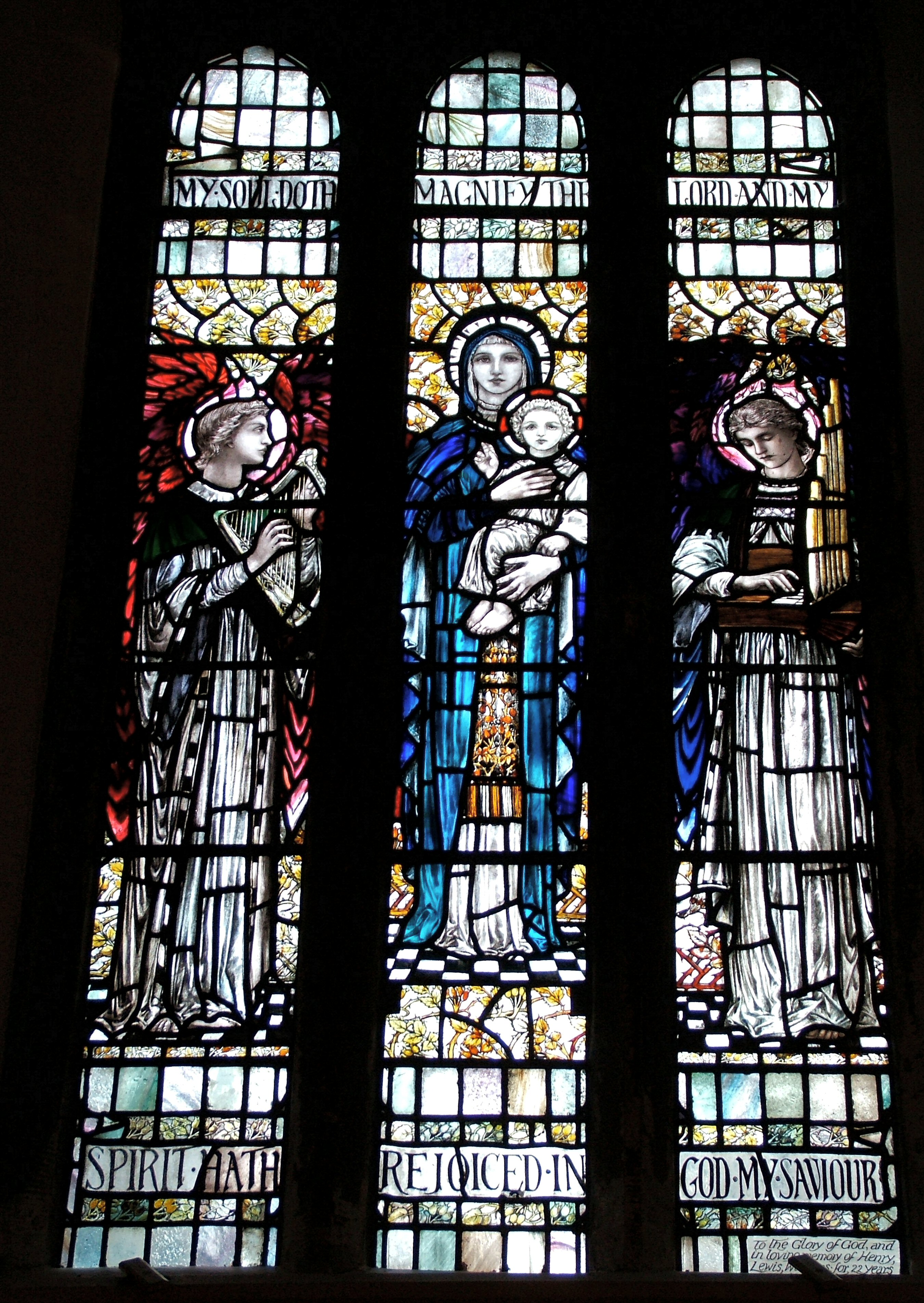
Whall window in St Mary's Church. Bleasby.Nottinghamshire. Image shown courtesy Diana Temperley.

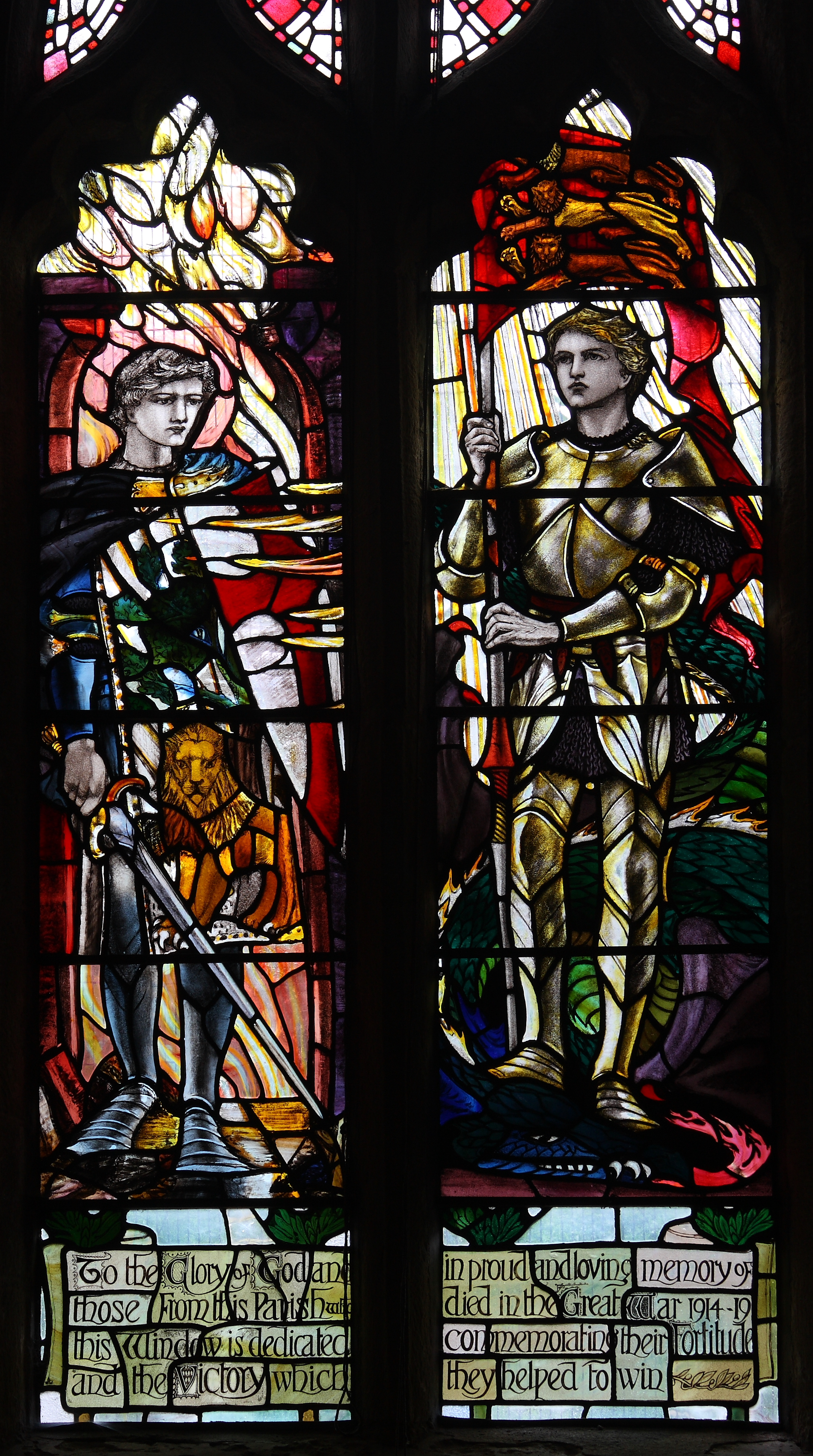
War Memorial window in St Mary's Church.Hornby.Yorkshire. Image shown courtesy Dave Webster.

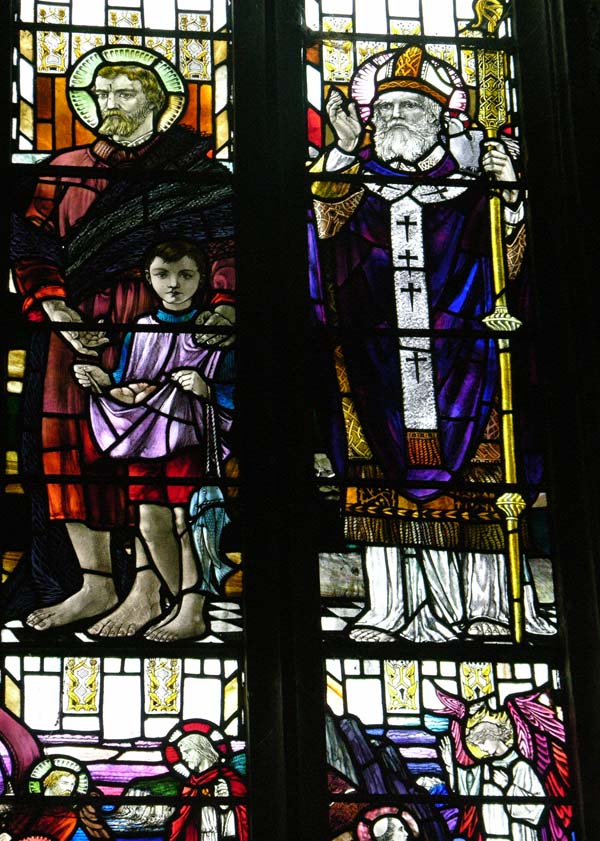
Part of window in Holy Trinity Church. Wickwar. South Gloucestershire.Image shown courtesy Keith Gale.

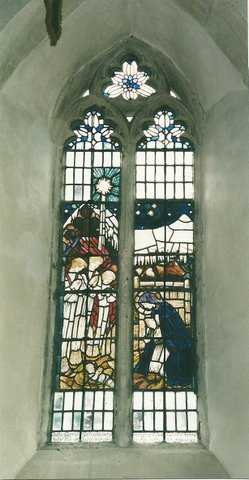
Window in the Church of the Holy Cross.Avening. Gloucestershire. Image courtesy Margaret Barton.

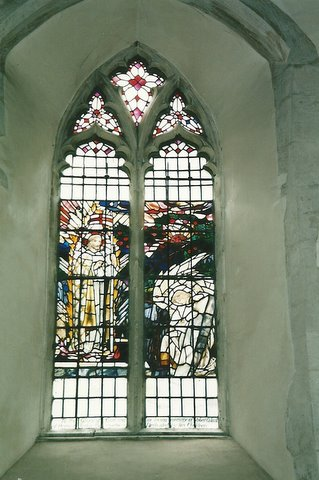
Window in the Church of the Holy Cross.Avening. Gloucestershire.

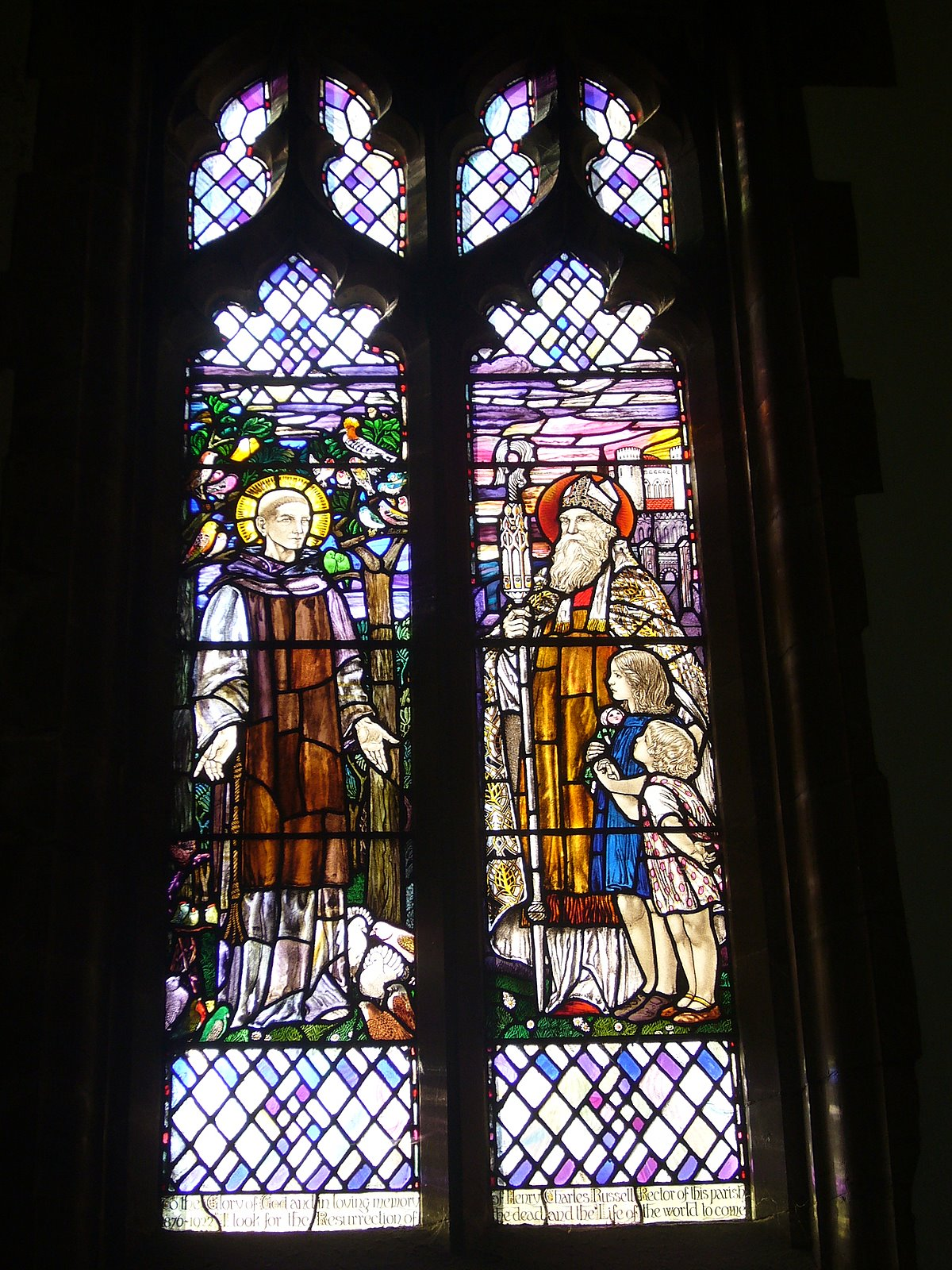
Window in St Leonard, Wollaton, Nottinghamshire.In memory of Henry Charles Russell (1842-1922), Rector of Wollaton 1876-1922.

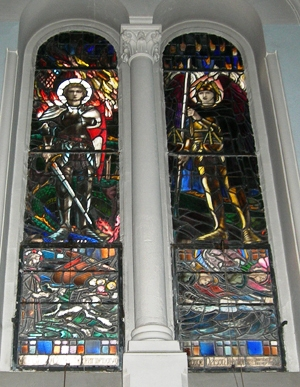
Window in Valescure France with St George and St Michael. Image courtesy Lindsay Benoist.

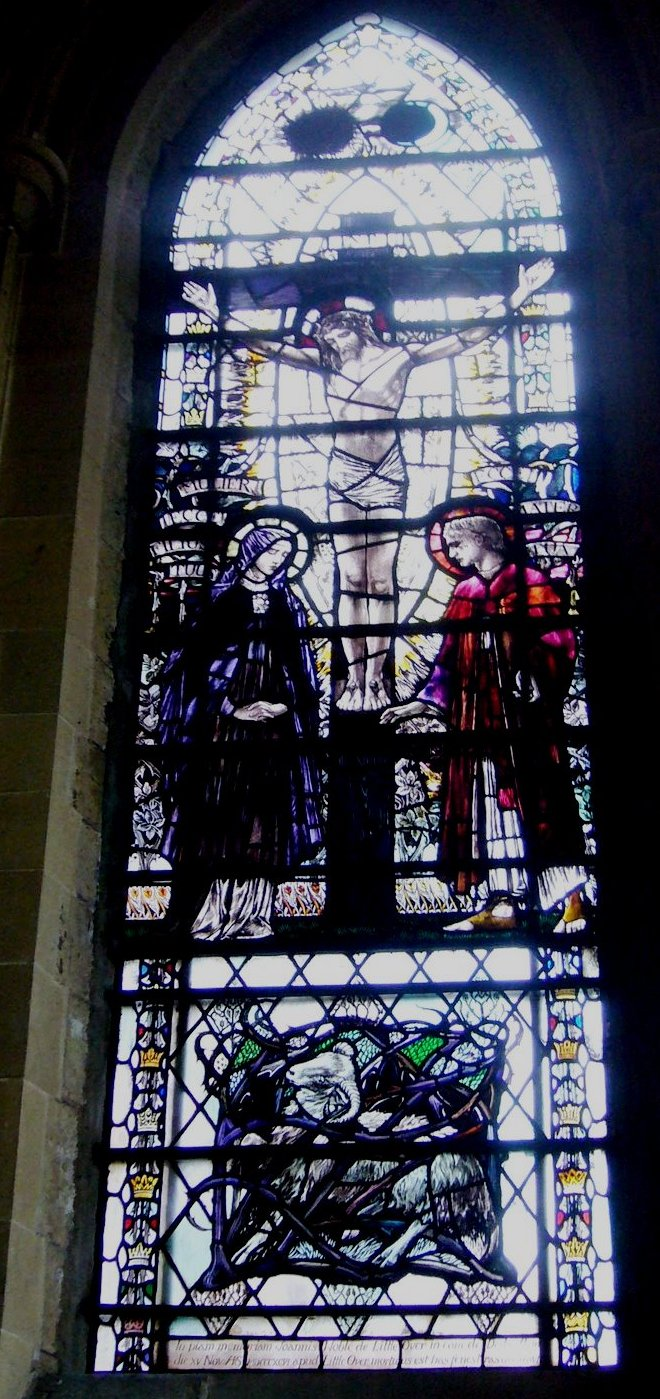
Left hand light of window in Southwell Minster

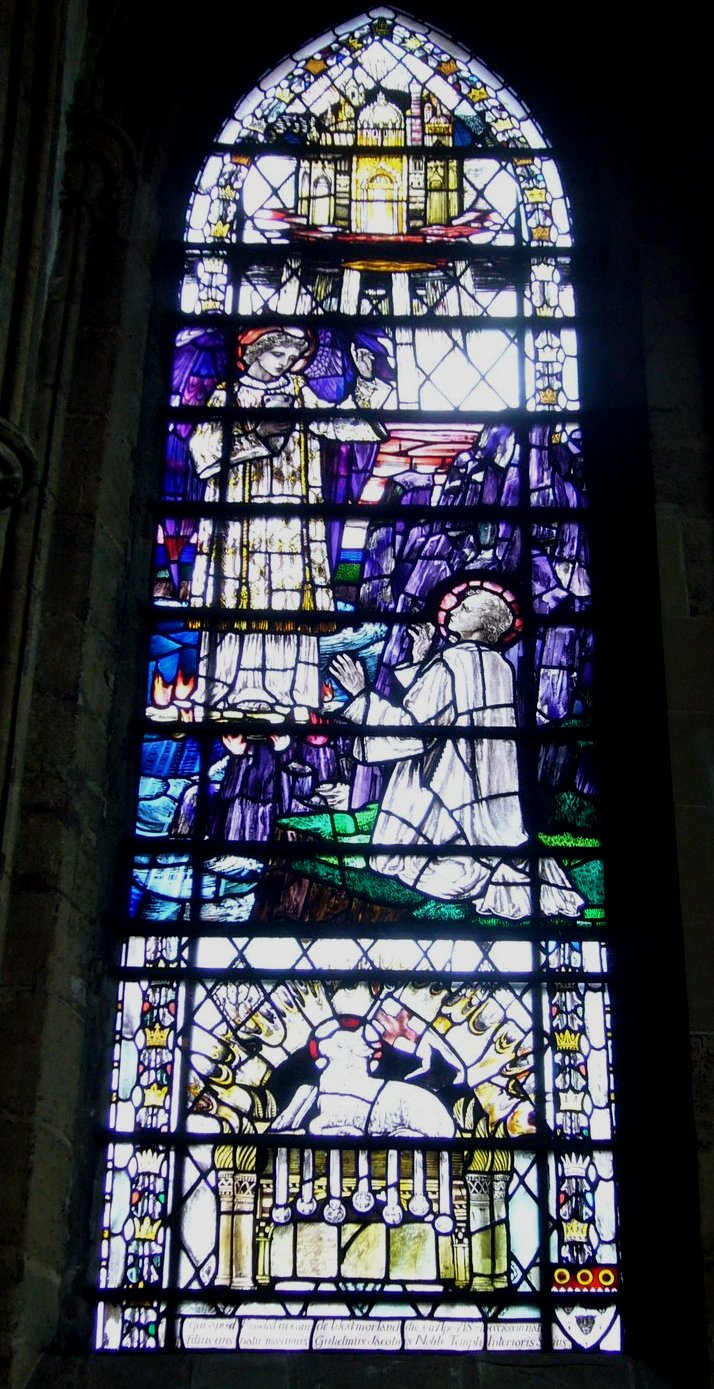
Right hand light of window in Southwell Minster

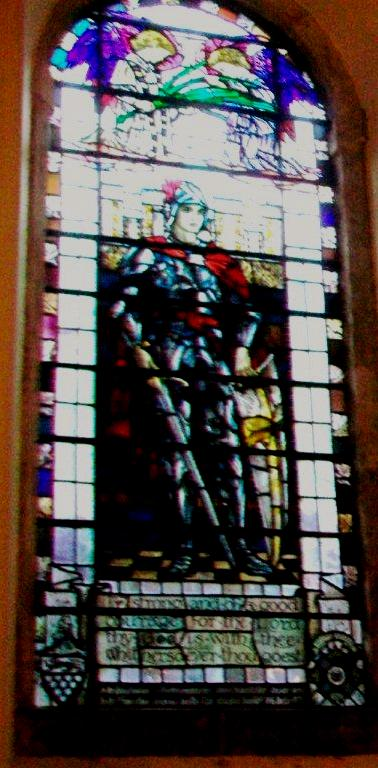
Window in St Andrew's. Wester under Lizard.

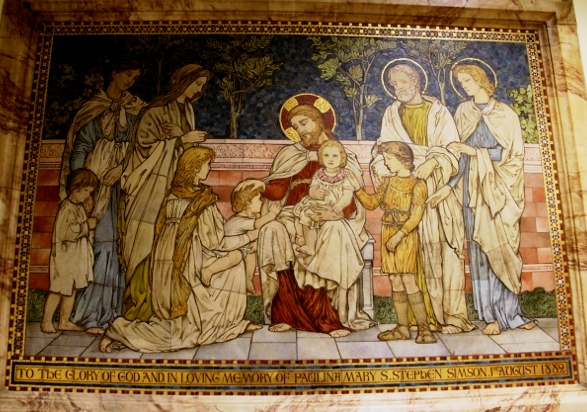
Opus panel in St Patrick's Church. Hove. Sussex

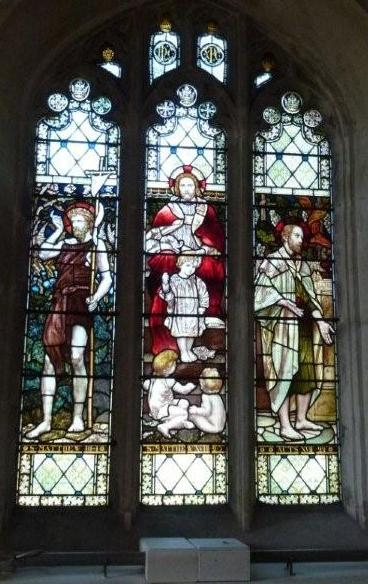
Window in St Giles' Church Stanton St Quintin

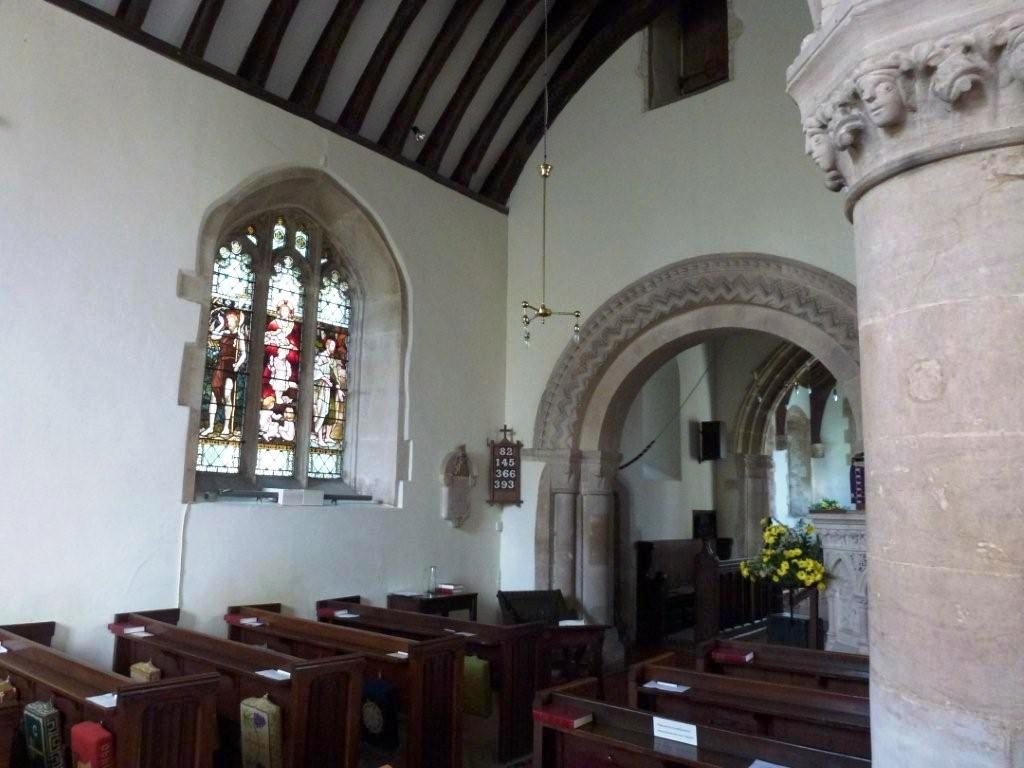
Another view of Stanton St Quintin window

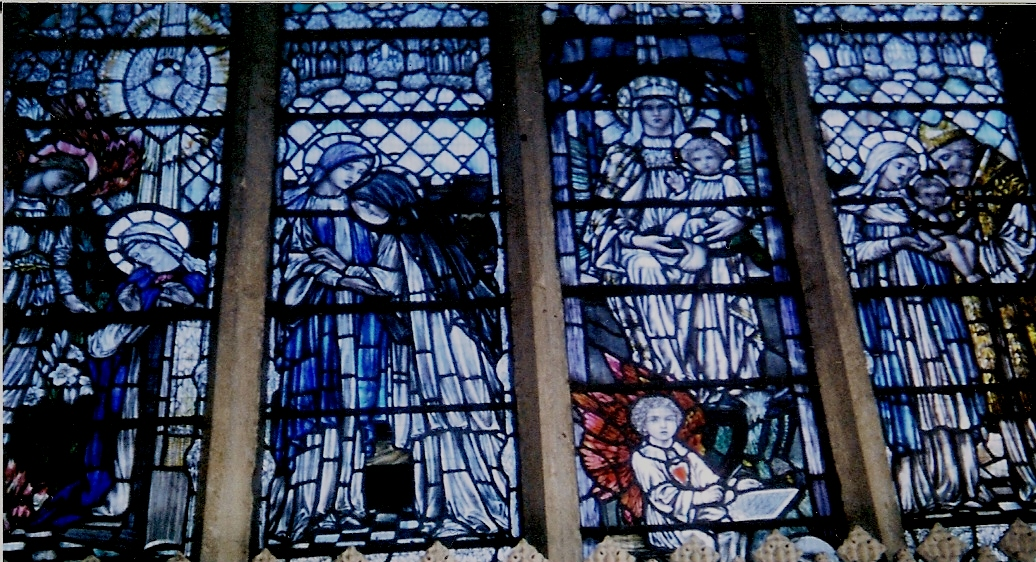
East window in St Mary's Church. Ashby Folville

== Other works ==
As stated above, Whall was educated at Rossall School in Lancashire. He returned there in 1891 to execute a stained glass window for the school chapel working together with Louis Davis. The window by Whall and Davis was dedicated to the Reverend W.A.Osborne who was the Headmaster at Rossall for many years and would in fact have been the Headmaster when the young Whall was a pupil at the school.

In 1890 Whall executed a three-light traceried East window for the South Chapel of Dorchester Cemetery.

John Dando Sedding designed St Saviour's House in Bristol, the building being completed by Henry Wilson. In 1894 Whall executed a window for the quadrangle corridor, this described by Andrew Foyle and Nikolaus Pevsner as "a fine window of the Good Shepherd in a thorny thicket" in their volume The Buildings of England. Somerset: North and Bristol. St Saviour's House is currently used as a Nursing Home.

Whall designed one of the two windows in the regimental chapel of the old London Woolwich Barracks and when these barracks were closed the windows were moved to St Alban the Martyr Church in Larkhill, Wiltshire. Whall's window included scenes of the old buildings of the Barracks. St Alban the Martyr is a Garrison Church and stands next to the main entrance of the Royal School of Artillery. In Whall's own description of the window, held at the Victoria & Albert Museum, he states that the subject of the window is Peace. The window is of five lights and the central light shows Christ in His Mother's arms, surrounded by His Heavenly Court of Cherubim and Seraphim, with Michael and Gabriel in support. Christ blesses the world from His Throne, to which is fixed the olive branch which is the Sceptre of His Kingdom and on which sits the dove with the olive leaf, the symbol of reconciliation. Beneath the Manger Cradle a child angel plays upon a dulcimer. A bodyguard of honour is grouped around the Throne, composed of those old warriors of the past who in their day have done their duty; while at its foot those who are carrying on the task kneel in worship. Another light shows the ruin and desolation of war with a depiction of Ypres in flames. St George stands in the breach and a young trumpeter is ready to sound the note of battle. Below is the kneeling figure of General Borgard, the "Father of the Regiment" and one of Marlborough's officers of artillery. In another light Whall depicts the era of Waterloo and in another he turns to the Crimea. In the lower portion of these two lights are grouped types of the present-day regiments in worship. Whall depicts the Field Service (with Mons ribbon and service stripes), the Padre, the Parade uniform and the Indian Service. The fifth and final light commemorates the Alliances of the late war with depictions of a French and Belgian soldier. These are placed under the patronage of the glorious Crusader, St Louis (Louis IX of France.) In the background is the Sainte Chapelle and at the base of the window is a view of the Royal Military Academy itself and the motto Quo Fas Et Gloria Ducunt.

There were instances where Whall was commissioned to submit designs for windows but in the event the commissions came to nought. In 1913 for example, Whall was asked to produce a scheme for five windows for the fifteenth century Lady Chapel of Christchurch Priory, but the windows were never made. There was opposition to Whall's windows on architectural/antiquarian grounds as his proposal involved the removal of the existing Victorian East window and structural changes to the half-windows on the North and South sides. Another such case involved six side windows for the Kensington Borough Cemetery Chapel at Hanwell. All six side windows were to represent Biblical incidents prophetic of the Resurrection. It is not known why the commission was not carried out.

== Lost works ==
- In the volume West Kent and The Weald, Pevsner refers to some Whall stained glass in the Tonbridge School Chapel. The windows were lost in the 1988 fire which destroyed much of the chapel. Had these windows survived they would undoubtedly be ranged along with those at Holy Trinity Sloane Street and Gloucester Cathedral as Whall's best works. St Augustine's Chapel at Tonbridge School was built between 1900 and 1909 and the headmaster at that time, Rev. Charles Tancock, D.D., had been headmaster at Rossall School when Whall worked on a window there. His daughter, Rachel Tancock, was to become one of Whall's students. Whall's East window in St Augustine's was a complex allegory of Redemption through Incarnation. Whall also designed two windows for the Sanctuary, these on the theme of Judgement. It was intended that the chapel would also have a series of windows representing the lives of English and Scottish patron saints and Whall designed what was known as the Welldon memorial window which depicted St Andrew, his life and his works. This window, in memory of Dr Welldon who was a former headmaster, includes the school motto "Deus dat incrementum", a motto chosen by Welldon. Another such window was what was to be known as the Graham memorial window, this depicting St Margaret of Scotland. In the central panel St Margaret holds in her right hand the Black Cross which she brought with her to Scotland, and which was the origin of "Holy Rood". This window commemorated Isabella Graham, the wife and mother of former Tonbridge pupils. The next such window, the South African War Memorial window, was of three-lights, and represented St George of Cappadocia and incidents from his life. This window includes the motto of the Skinners Company "In Christo Fratres". This series of windows featuring patron saints was continued in later years by Karl Parsons, Lilian Pocock and Rachel Tancock, all of whom had studied under Whall. Her best known work is the stained glass window in St Botolph's Church, Cambridge.
- The same Pevsner volume refers to work by Whall in All Saints Church, Swanscombe, Kent. This Norman Shaw designed church, dates from 1893, opened in 1895 but was closed in 1971 and converted to apartments. The Whall window may still be intact but within the apartment block.
- Whall completed a Great War memorial window in 1918 for St Mark's Church in Leeds. It shows the stoning of Stephen, the first Christian martyr. The window commemorates Second Lieutenant Cecil Wellesley Ward, Royal Fleet Auxiliary, elder son of the Rev George Nussey Ward of Askham Bryan near York. He was killed in action in 1917 during the First World War. Although closed between 2001 - 2014, this church has now been restored by Gateway Church, Leeds as a place of worship and community use.

== Notes ==
Please see Peter Cormack, Arts & Crafts Stained Glass (Yale University Press, 2015)
