= Institute for East West Strategic Studies =

UK think tank

- Formation: 1997
- Type: Think tank
- Headquarters: Apethorpe Palace; Apethorpe, England
- Chairman: Professor Jean Christophe Iseux von Pfetten

The Institute for East West Strategic Studies (RIESS) is a think tank, incorporated as a charity registered in the UK since 17 October 1997 under number 1068421. RIESS has a strong relationship with the University of Oxford and the University of Cambridge, with many alumni sitting either on its advisory board or on its board of trustees.

== Purpose ==
The goal of RIESS is to enhance better communication between East and West at leadership level. RIESS used to be hosted by Merton College, Oxford. Its permanent seat is now within the premises of the secluded former royal palace of Apethorpe.

Governance is handled by a board of trustees constituted of one permanent director (also called chairman) seconded by two vice-chairmen (Owen Matthews and Paul Laikin). The Board also includes the current President and former Presidents of the advisory board as well as two Academic representatives from respectively Oxford and Cambridge Universities. RIESS is privately funded and free of any political affiliation.

RIESS holds periodic seminars on various facets of East West strategic relations using Track II diplomacy and applying Chatham House Rule.

RIESS is supported by an advisory board constituted of fifty former Minister level Thought Leaders. Bob Hawke, former Prime Minister of Australia, was President of the advisory board from 2005 to 2019. He was succeeded by former French Defence Minister Michele Aliot-Marie. Dame Jessica Rawson, then Master of Merton College, Oxford, was Academic Adviser from Oxford University for the period between 2010 and 2015. She was succeeded by Prof. Denise Lievesley, Principal of Green Templeton College, Oxford completing her own tenure in 2022. Prof. John Coates from Emmanuel College, Cambridge was the Academic Adviser from Cambridge University during the period between 2015 and 2022. New academic advisers from both universities were appointed starting May 2023 namely Lt.Gen. Douglas Chalmers, Master of Emmanuel College, Cantab; and, Sir Michael Dixon, Principal of Green Templeton College, Oxon.

== Influence on Iran nuclear disarmament negotiations ==
Since early 2013 RIESS held several confidential meetings involving top military commanders from Israel and Iran as well as a selection of military representatives from P5 nations and contributed to changing the Iranian position ahead of the official Nuclear Deal. RIESS hosted a breakthrough meeting at Chateau de Selore on 3 November 2013 where two generals from Israel and Iran met for the first time to discuss the issue along with senior officials from P5 nations. The French and Chinese press reported that the success of the Nuclear Interim Deal achieved in Geneva on 11 November 2013 can be credited to this meeting held in France earlier that month. After the Grand Deal achieved in Vienna in July 2015, the US press also reported that "The nuclear deal would not have been possible without the active involvement of Iran sole trusted friend - China" and that Chinese officials were involved in "a series of back-channel meetings in the run-up to July's grand deal" hosted by former Ambassador Prof. Jean Christophe Iseux von Pfetten, Chairman of RIESS.
