= List of War Memorial windows by Christopher Whall =

This is a list of War Memorial windows by Christopher Whall.

Whall's other works include:

- Gloucester Cathedral
- Works in Scotland
- Cathedrals and Minsters windows

== Stained-glass windows serving as War Memorials ==
"The last decade of Whall's career encompassed the First World War and the years immediately following, in which the studio's output largely consisted of war memorial windows, a poignant swan-song. Throughout England and further afield, in over fifty windows in town and country churches, Whall's glowing figures of the warrior Saints- the Archangel Michael, St George and St Alban for England, St Joan and St Louis for France-commemorate those who served and fell in the war. Like many of the best works of art created out of the conflict, they express not only the mourning and nostalgia of individuals and communities, but also much of the artist's own outlook and feelings. During the war he had, for example, been appalled at the waves of ignorant anti-German hysteria. So, in his designs for commemorative windows, the positive virtues of Sacrifice and Courage take precedence over any jingoistic triumphalism"

— from "Aglow with brave resplendent colour" by Peter Cormack

Here are details of some of these war memorial windows.

Church	Location	Date(s)	Subject, notes and references
All Saints	Glasbury.Powys.	About 1914	This church includes a two-light window depicting the Archangels Michael and St George standing on a dragon and a child angel appearing to rescue a child from a stream in the main tracery light. The window is situated in the North wall of the Nave. The dedication reads- "I will see you again. And your heart shall rejoice" — Window inscription The window remembers Walter de Winton (1892–1914) who was killed at the Battle of the Marne on 6 September 1914. Walter was the son of Major Walter de Winton and Hylda Terese Jane de Winton of Maesllwch Castle, Radnorshire. He served as a Second Lieutenant in the 3rd Battalion Coldstream Guards and is buried at Bouilly Cross Roads Military Cemetery.
St Mildred	Nursted, Kent	1916	A five-light window dedicated to Major General Henry Edmund Edmeades and commissioned by the architect, Herbert Baker (Edmeades was his father-in-law).The window is an East window and depicts the Saints Mildred and George to the right of Jesus Christ and the Saints Alban and Anselm to His left.
Church of St Peblig	Caernarfon, Gwynedd	About 1920	Whall's two-light window depicts St George and St Martin of Tours. The window is in the South wall of the Nave and was given by friends in memory of Morys Wynne-Jones of Treiorwerth, Anglesey, born in 1887 and killed in action in Belgium in 1914. He was the son of the Rev.J.W.Wynne-Jones and was a Lieutenant in the Royal Engineers. His name appears in panel 9 on the Ypres (Menin Gate) Memorial as one of the "Missing": those men whose bodies were never found.
St Andrew	Weston-under-Lizard.Staffordshire	1918	Whall's window in this church depicts St George. The window is inscribed as being in memory of "Brigadier General the Honourable Francis Charles Bridgeman, Son of the 5th Earl of Bradford, Born 4 July 1846, died 14 September 1917". Whall was working on this window when the news of the Armistice reached London so he added the inscription "1918 Novr.11.11 a.m. Deo Gratis. C.W.W." See image in gallery below shown courtesy Tony Townsend.
All Saints	Little Casterton.Rutland	1919	West window depicts St George and remembers George Hubert Eaton killed in 1918
Gray's Inn Chapel	Holborn.London	1920	Whall was responsible for a window in Gray's Inn Chapel. This is a war memorial which features St George, St Michael and St Louis. A small panel towards the bottom of the window shows the bridge that used to span the connecting road between the two main squares of the Inn, South Square and Gray's Inn Square. See images in gallery below.
St Leonard	Wollaton.Nottinghamshire	circa 1917	There is a Whall window on the North wall of the Chancel which remembers James Cosmo Russell (1878–1917). It is a two-light window and depicts St Michael and St George. The inscription reads- "To the Glory of God and in ever most loving memory of my husband, Lieut-Colonel James Cosmo Russell DSO 9th Hodson's Horse Indian Army/Killed in action on July 31st 1917 at the third battle of Ypres whilst in command of the 6th Battalion Queen's Own. Cameron Highlanders." — Window inscription The widow was erected to commemorate Lieutenant Colonel James Cosmo Russell, commander to the 6th Battalion Queen's Own Cameron Highlanders.
St Mary	Hornby, North Yorkshire		Window remembers the men of the parish of Hornby who were killed in the Great War.
St Nicholas	Newport, Shropshire (previously until 1981 at Longford Church, Shropshire)	About 1920	The Whall window is in the St Nicholas Chapel inside the north-west corner of Newport's mediaeval Parish Church. Given in memory of Ralph and Charles Leeke of Longford Hall who both died in the Great War; Charles Leeke, Lieutenant, Grenadier Guards, died at Le Toquet of wounds received at Ypres on 7 April 1916. The window depicts a crucified Christ before a lurid red sunset, and an array of battlefield grave marking crosses.
St Peter	Hinton on the Green.Worcestershire	1920	This church is dominated by a fine Perpendicular tower and has a twelfth-century Nave (with later windows), though the building has been much restored, first by Preedy in 1863 and latterly by John Dando Sedding who added the Chancel in 1895. Whall's 5-light East window remembers two men who were killed in World War I, Sidney Diston of the 7th Gloucester Regiment who fell at Grandcourt on 18 November 1916 and John William Robert Gould of the 3rd Worcester Regiment who fell at Hooge on 16 January 1915. The centre light features a "Christ in Majesty" and the two lights far right and left below which Diston and Gould are mentioned feature St George and St Michael respectively. Described by Nikolaus Pevsner and Alan Brooks in their volume on Worcestershire as "fine East window 1920 war memorial".
St Mary and St Thomas	Knebworth, Hertfordshire		This church dates from 1120 and is better known as St Mary's. It is dedicated to the Virgin Mary and St Thomas of Canterbury. The Whall window in this church is a two-light window with a soldier in blue armour going to war depicted in one light and a soldier unbuckling gold armour after the battle in the other. The windows is a memorial to Leslie Arnott Paterson, 2nd Lieutenant of the Essex Regiment and is entitled "Soldier before battle, Soldier after battle." The inscription reads- Faithful/be thou unto death/thee a crown I will give of life/and to the glory of God and in loving memory of Leslie Arnott Paterson/2nd Lieut Essex Regiment. Fell at Fromelles France May 1915 Aged 25 — Window inscription Paterson is buried in the St Mary's churchyard.
St Peter and St Paul	Sywell		Whall made the peace memorial window in this church. The window remembers the 8 Sywell men who perished in the Great War. Called the "Jericho" window, it has four lights and features Joshua outside the walls of Jericho. Note the scenery in the background of the window depicting the sun, moon and stars. The church is thought to have been built between the twelfth and fourteenth century but restored between 1862 and 1870. It is a Grade II listed building.
St Peter	Glentham, Lincolnshire		Whall designed the memorial window dedicated to Capt. Sir Montague Aubrey Rowley Cholmeley.Bt, in this church. It comprises a three-light window with tracery lights. The window depicts St George and the dragon in the centre light and shields are depicted in the left and right hand lights. The inscription reads- "For King and Country to the Glory of God and in ever loving memory of Montague Aubrey Rowley Cholmeley, 4th Bart, of Easton, Grantham and Montague Place, Lincoln, Captain in the Grenadier Guards, Born 12th June 1876, killed in action near Festubert, France on Christmas Eve 1914. This window is placed here by his wife Janetta." — Window inscription Cholmeley's name appears on the Le Touret Memorial.
Denstone College Chapel.	Denstone, Staffordshire	1916	Whall designed the three-light stained glass window in the Chapel with a rose window above it. This window was given partly by mothers of Old Destonians who had been killed in the war and by others who wish to show sympathy with those who had been bereaved. The window was dedicated in 1916. See image in gallery courtesy Tin Giraffe.
St Matthew	Pentrich, Derbyshire	1916	Whall designed the memorial window on the North wall of the Chancel.The inscription reads "He had delivered my soul in Peace from the battle that was against me. To the Glory of God and in loving memory of our son Bernard Winthrop Smith, Captain 1st/ Scots Guards" — Window inscription The window has three lights and a Saint is depicted in each. St George is portrayed in the left hand light, St Michael in the central light and St Louis in the light to the right. The inscription is beneath the figures and sits across the three lights. The window was unveiled on 4 March 1916 by the Bishop of Derby.
St Andrew	Chippenham, Wiltshire	1918	Whall designed the memorial window in the outer Chapel. The inscription reads- "Princips exercitus domini gloria in excelsis deo et in terra pax abgelus domini sanctus sit in ifinere vestro/Vox in rama audija est visiuntoccalis ensipientum mori etae simata est afflitio exitus quormododo sedet sol/ploratus et ululatus illorum et quoda a noris est iter exterminium civitas plena populo/requiescant in pace/(Base of window) To the Glory of God in memory of three sons of Mervyn Sepping and Helen Jane Wilson, Herbert Raymond Capt. in 114 Maharattas born 29 Sept 1888 killed in action in Mesopotamia Jan 9th 1917, Evelyn Seppings Wilson East Yorks Regt born March 5th 1893 killed in Hulluch France 20th Feb 1915 Geoffrey Mervyn Underhill Wilson Capt Wiltshire Regt born Aug 5th 1894 killed in action at Loos France Sept 15th 1915" — Window inscription This is a four light window. In the light to the far left St Michael is portrayed with portraits of the three brothers remembered together with a kneeling woman and the Wilson family crest. In the light to the left is the Archangel Gabriel complete with the Scales of Justice, Flanders Crosses and the badge of the 114 Maharattas. In the next light and moving to the right we have an unidentified Archangel with sun, crosses, flowers, Flanders Crosses and the badge of the East Yorkshire Regiment. Finally the light on the far right features St George with scenes of war and the badge of the Wiltshire Regiment. In "The Buildings of England:Wiltshire" by Nikolaus Pevsner, revised by Bridget Cherry, the window is described as "in a kind of Pre-Raphaelite Expressionism".
St Peter	Racton.Sussex	1918	A five-light window with elaborate traceries. The inscription reads- To the Glory of God and in tender memory of Stephen Edmund Fell Lieut Irish Guards and of Basil Robert Francis Sec Lieut Coldsteam Guards aged 20 and 19 who gave their lives for their country at Ypres and at Les Boeufs July 12th and Oct 3 1916/The dearly loved only sons of their sorrowing parents Henry E and Ethel M Christy by whom this window is dedicated. They kept the commandments of God and the faith of Jesus. Rev. XIV.12 Love never faileth Cor XIII.1 Xmas 1918 — Window inscription The five lights from left to right depict the family crest and badge of the Irish Guards; the deceased as a mediaeval knight in blue cloak with inverted sword; an unidentified saint; deceased as mediaeval knight in full armour with lance, banner and sheathed sword;the family crest and badge of the Coldstream Guards. The five tracery lights show biblical scenes.
St Andrew	Caversham	1918	Whall was responsible for the central light of a three-light window in the South Aisle. He featured a representation of St George. The window was in memory of Norman Allnalt who died in 1916.
All Hallows	Kirkburton	1920	All Hallows Church is a large and beautiful building dating back at least eight centuries with a list of incumbents that can be traced back at least as far as 1230. The church is built of local stone with a stone slate roof, and is a Grade I listed building. There are a number of stained glass windows including the main East window and one of the finest modern stained glass art-deco windows in Yorkshire by Whall. In Whall's 1920, two-light window one light commemorates Ernest A.Carter who fell at Ypres. The inscription reads- "In affectionate remembrance of Ernest A Carter, son of Robert and Harriet Carter. Pte 10th Batt. Duke of Wellington's W.R.Regiment who fell in action near Ypres. June 7th.1917" Window inscription The second light remembers John W Carter who fell at Suvla Bay in 1915.The text which carries across the foot of both lights reads: "Be thou faithful unto death and I will give thee the Crown of Life" (Revelation, 2:10).
St Leonard	Apethorpe, Northamptonshire	Between 1921 and 1924	Whall designed a Memorial window to Gerard Charles Brassey, Second Lieutenant Coldstream Guards, who was killed in action on 27 August 1918. He was buried at Mory Cemetery near St Leger in France. In a letter describing the design for the window, Whall wrote- "The church being dedicated to St Leonard and there being two St Leonards- one an Englishman and the other a Frenchman, and there being two windows, side by side, it has been thought appropriate, especially in the cordial feeling now existing between the two countries, to commemorate both Saints. They have one feature in common: they are both represented with chains, being both associated with the release of prisoners from captivity, Leonard of Ryseby (the Crusader) having been seven years captive to the Saracens in Palestine and Leonard of Limoges having obtained from the King of France the privilege of releasing from captivity any prisoners in the district of which he was Abbot. Considering that the two countries, by their alliance in war have won a very narrow escape from captivity both for themselves and the World their commemoration together seems appropriate as a war memorial subject."
St Etheldreda	Hatfield.Hertfordshire	1920	Whall designed the memorial window on the North wall of the Nave near to the porch. The window is dedicated to the memory of three of the Cecil family. The inscription reads "TO THE GLORY OF GOD AND IN MEMORY OF RUPERT EDWARD GASCOYNE CECIL BORN JANY 20TH 1895 KILLED IN ACTION JULY 11 1915 AND OF RANDLE WILLIAM GASCOYNE CECIL BORN NOVR 28TH 1889 KILLED IN ACTION DECR 1ST 1917 AND OF JOHN ARTHUR GASCOYNE CECIL BORN MARCH 28TH 1893 KILLED IN ACTION AUGUST 27TH 1918 I LOOK FOR THE RESURRECTION OF THE DEAD AND THE LIFE OF THE WORLD TO COME” — Window inscription The window consists of three lights. The window was presented in 1920 by James, Fourth Marquess of Salisbury, in memory of his three nephews. Their father was Lord William Cecil, then Bishop of Exeter who had previously been rector at Hatfield. The three angels in the work represent "Trial and Sacrifice" (crown of thorns), "Victory and Triumph" (resurrection and torch) and "Christian Duty" (baptism of the infant). The red seraphim in the tracery above represents "Divine Love" and the blue seraphim represents "Divine Wisdom".
United Reformed Church	Purley, South London	1920	Church has an East window by Whall which serves as a War Memorial.
St Peter	Norton-on-Derwent, North Yorkshire	1921	A stone tablet and Whall designed window are dedicated to the 119 parishioners who died in The Great War. The inscription reads:- (on tablet) To the glory of God/and in memory of the men/of this parish who gave/their lives in the Great War/1914-1919/(names)/Their name liveth for evermore (on window) 1914-1918 — Window inscription The window was unveiled on 11 November 1921 by Lieutenant-Colonel A.D.Legard and dedicated by the Bishop Suffragan of Hull. The four British patron saints portrayed symbolise 1) "Spiritual Victory" - St Patrick drives out the snakes 2) "National Victory" - St George slays the dragon 3) "Plenty" - St Andrew with the boy with the loaves and fishes and 4) "Plenty and Unity" - St David, the inspired preacher who united the church of his day. The lower panels show 1) the horror and destruction of war 2) the conquest of evil 3) stilling the storm and 4) a boat reaching safe harbour. The tracery above the window shows the crown of thorns, then nails and the reed, symbols of sacrifice. In the volume in The Buildings of England series which covers "Yorkshire: York and the East Riding", David Neave and Nikolaus Pevsner describe the window as "adventurous". The window is the West window in the Tower.

=== gallery ===
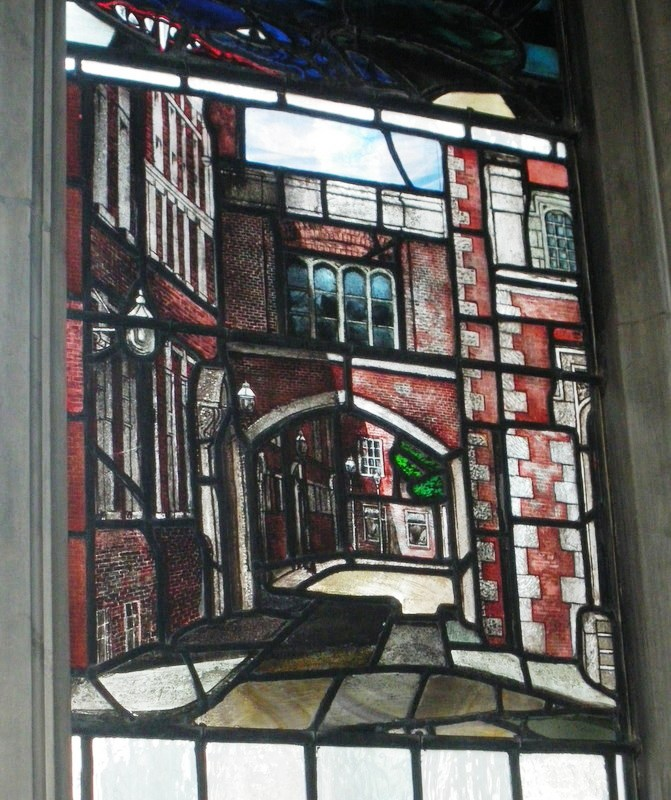
Detail from window in Gray's Inn Chapel, London

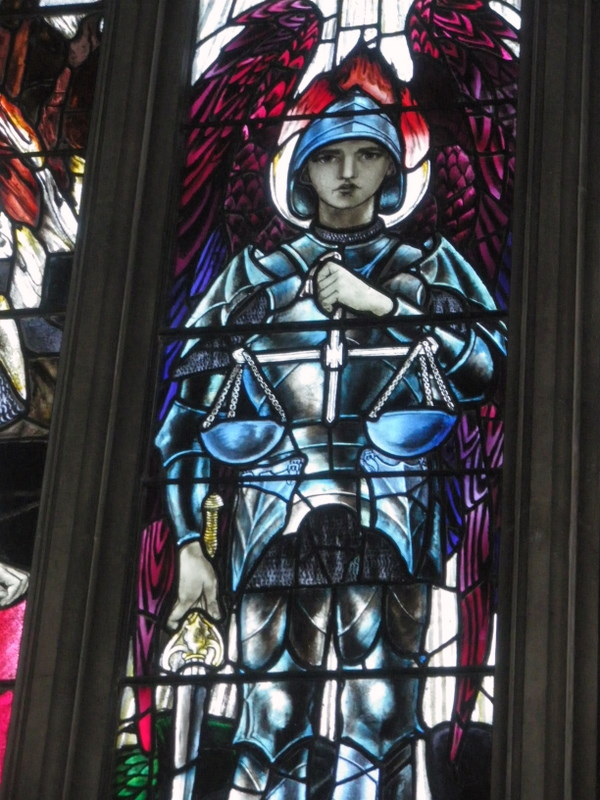
Detail from window in Gray's Inn Chapel, London

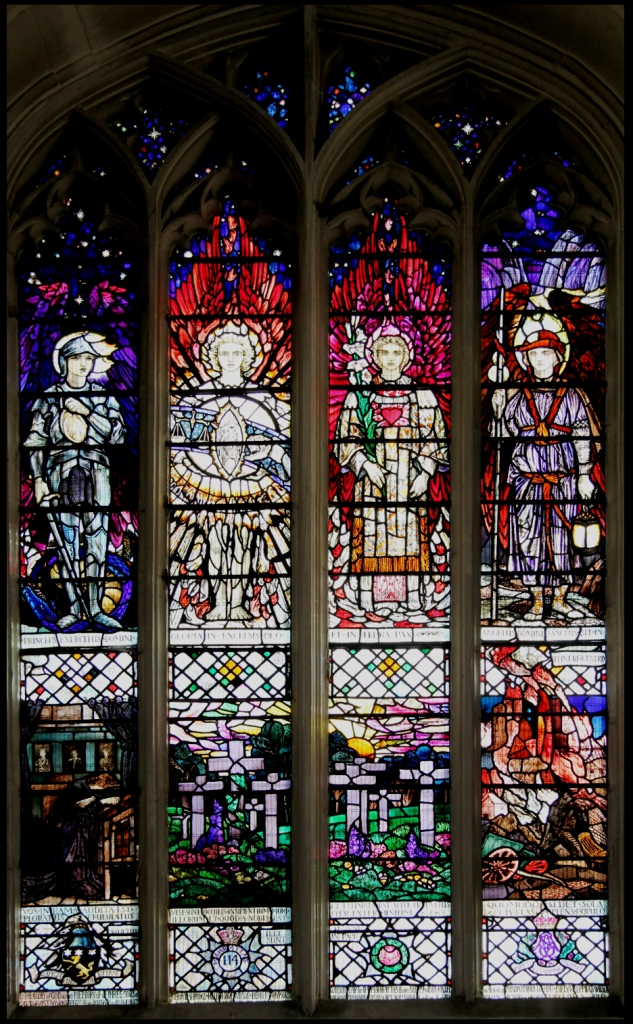
War Memorial Window St Andrew's, Chippenham.

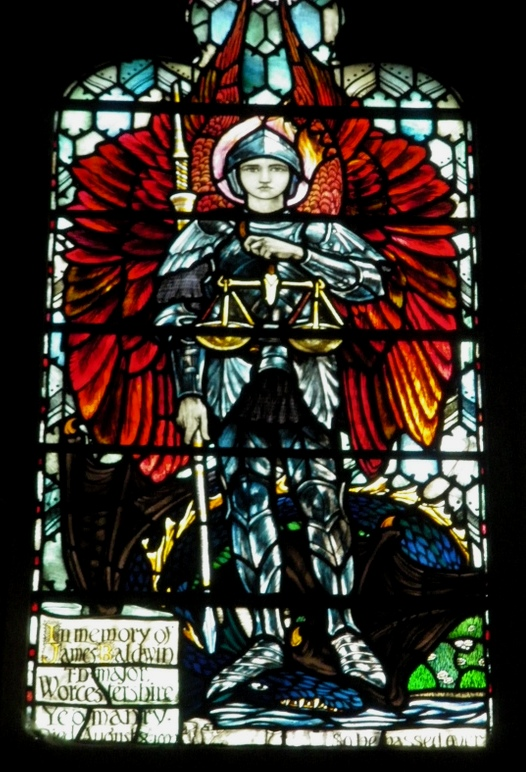
Left hand light Baldwin Memorial Window in Worcester Cathedral

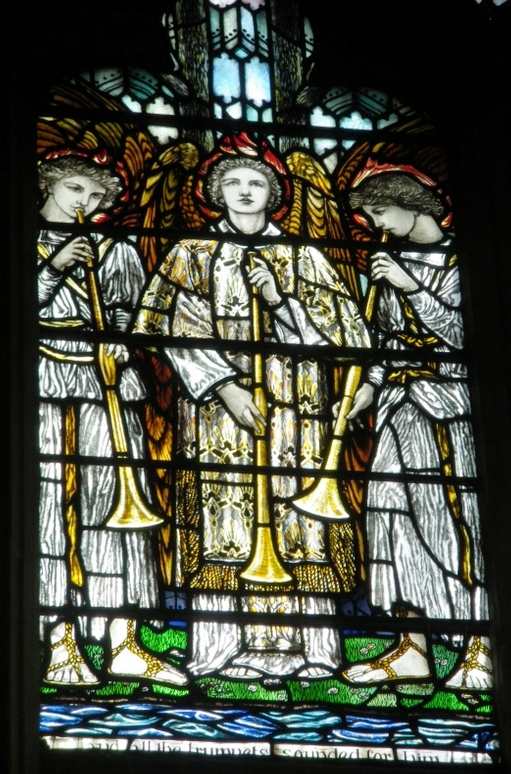
Centre light Baldwin Memorial Window in Worcester Cathedral

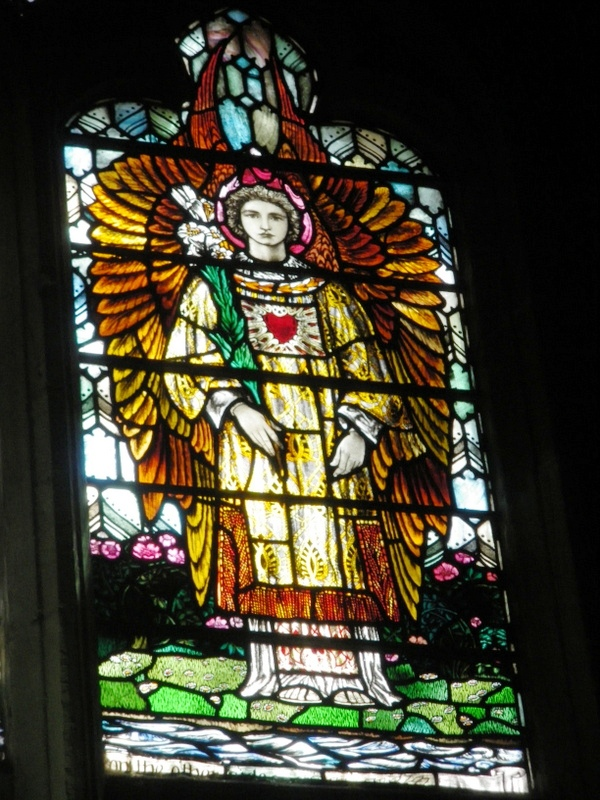
Right hand light Baldwin Memorial window in Worcester Cathedral

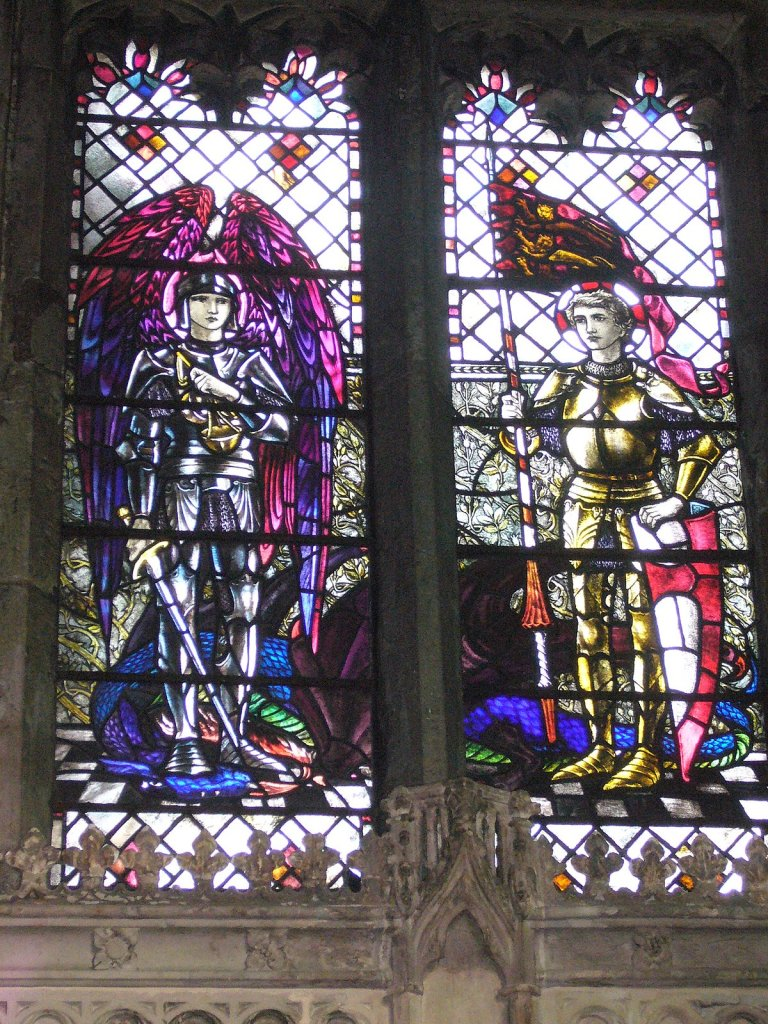
War Memorial window in St Leonard, Wollaton.Nottinghamshire. Remembers James Cosmo Russell (1878-1917) killed at Ypres.

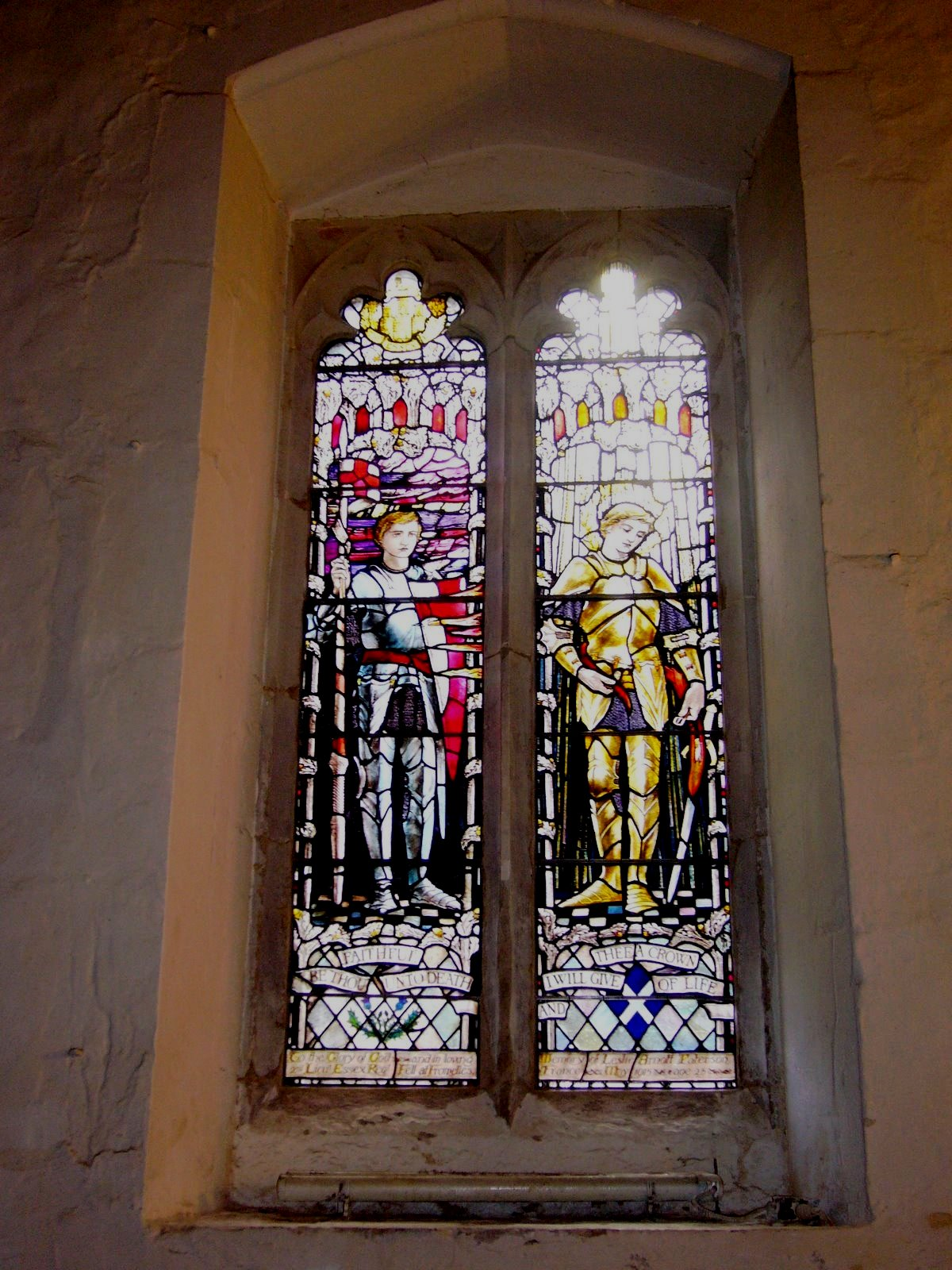
War Memorial window in St Mary and St Thomas, Knebworth

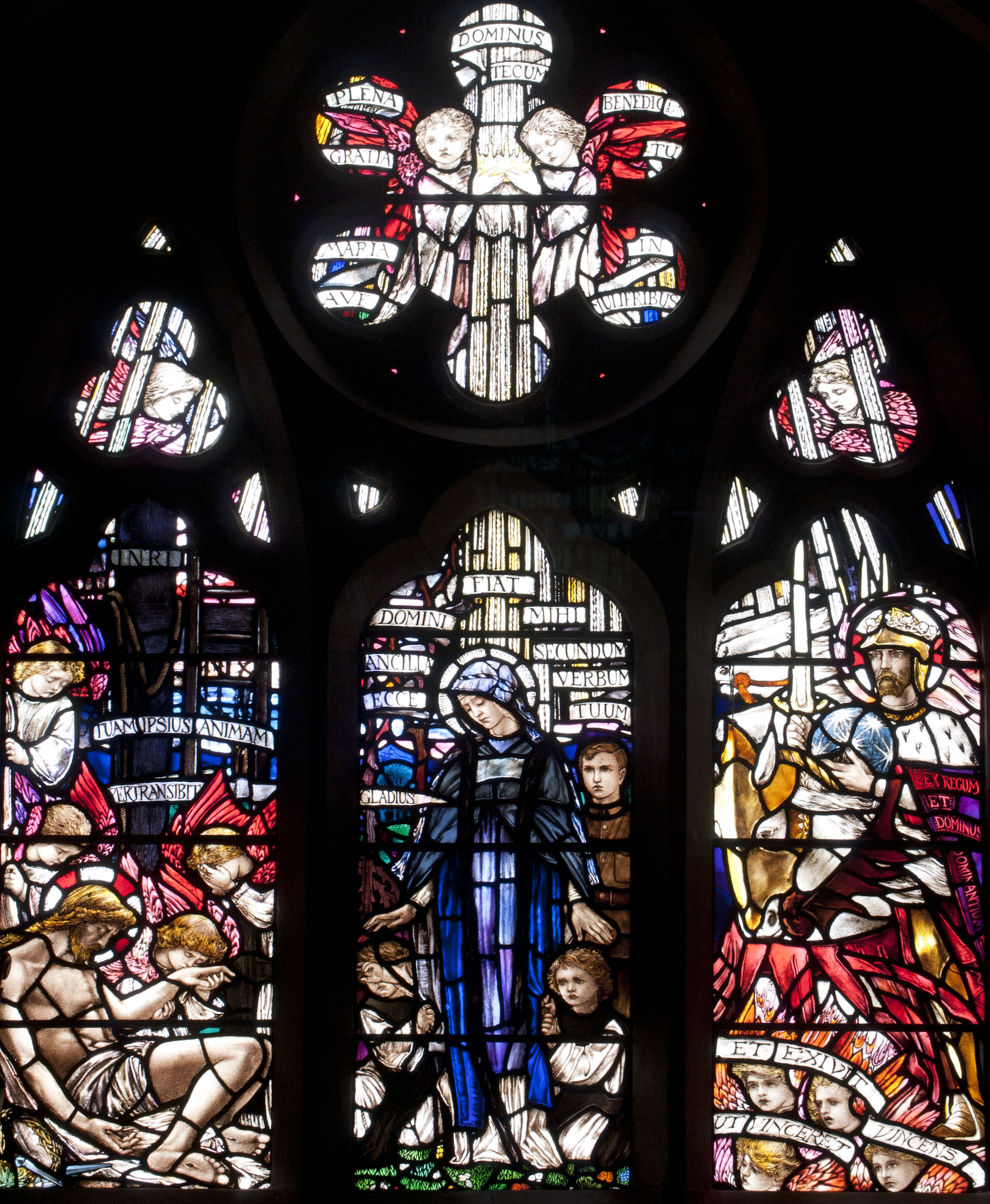
Whall window in Denstone College shown courtesy Tin Giraffe
