= Grace Mildmay =

- Born: Grace Sharington c. 1552; Wiltshire
- Died: 27 July 1620 (aged 67–68)
- Burial place: St Leonard's Church, Apethorpe
- Spouse: Sir Anthony Mildmay (m. 1567; died 1617)
- Children: Mary Mildmay
- Parents: Sir Henry Sharington (father); Ann Paggett (mother)

Grace, Lady Mildmay (née Sharington or Sherington; ca. 1552–1620) was an English noblewoman, memoirist and medical practitioner. Her autobiography is one of the earliest existing autobiographies of an English woman. Originally from Wiltshire, she married Sir Anthony Mildmay in 1567 and moved to Apethorpe Hall, his father's home in Northamptonshire. She practised medicine on her family and others, with an extensive knowledge of medical theory, and a large repertoire of cures. Her writings included memoirs, medical papers and devotional meditations.

== Biography ==
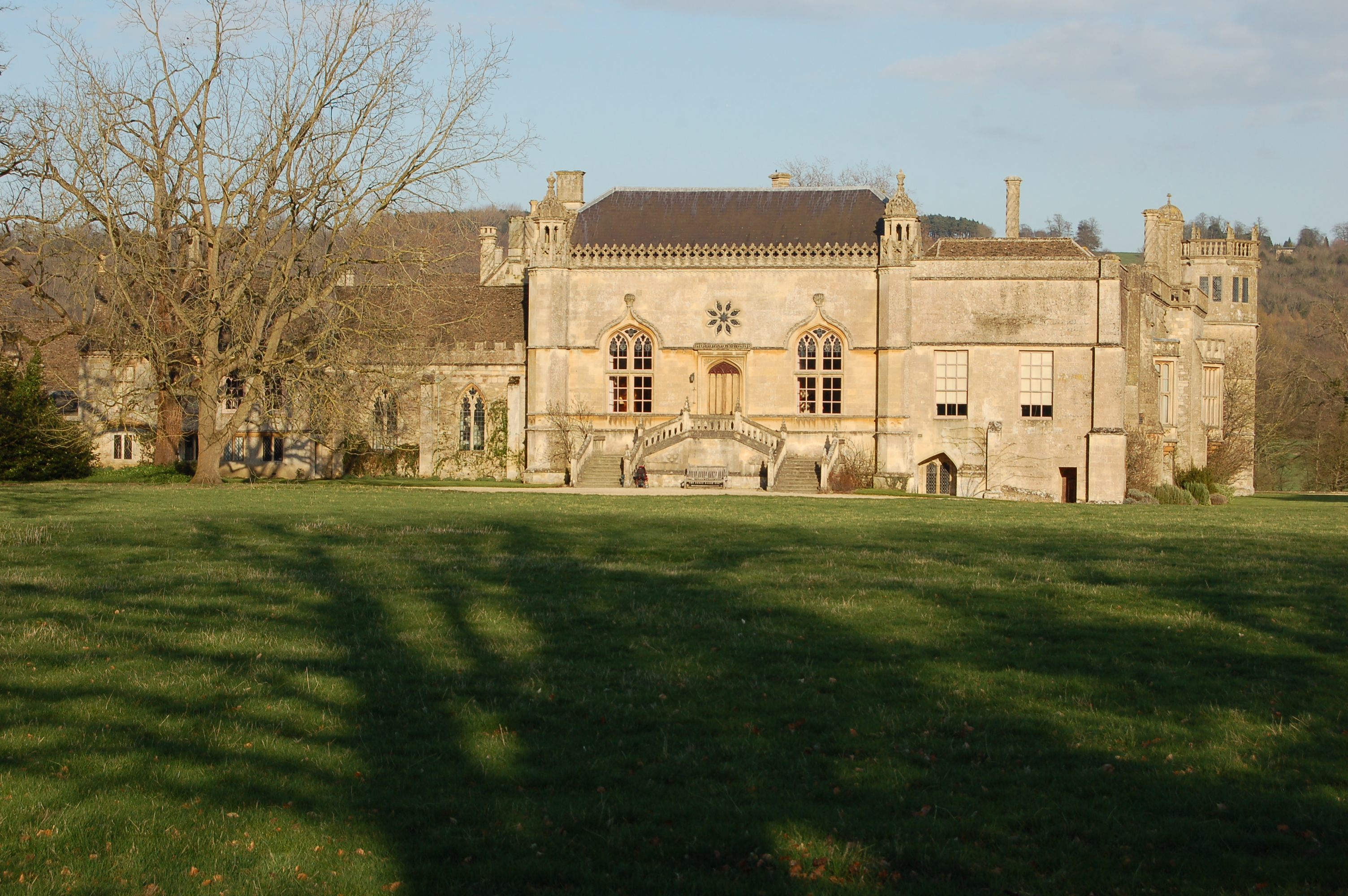
Lacock Abbey, Wiltshire

Lady Mildmay was born Grace Sharington or Sherington ca. 1552 in Wiltshire. She was the second daughter of Sir Henry Sharington or Sherington, and his wife, Ann (née Paggett) of Lacock Abbey, a niece of the High Sheriff of Wiltshire, from whom her father had inherited Lacock Abbey. She had an older sister, Ursula, and a younger sister, Olive. Their brother, William, died in infancy. Their governess was a Mistress Hamblyn, a niece of Sir Henry who had been brought up by the Sharingtons.

Mistress Hamblyn taught strong puritan values, as well as some medical knowledge including basic surgery. Grace also received lessons in music, needle-work, arithmetic and letter-writing. In her memoirs, she recalled witnessing visitors to Lacock Abbey who were of questionable moral character. On these occasions, Mistress Hamblyn encouraged her to write verse against the visitors' immorality. From her mother, she acquired the habit of daily spiritual meditation. In later life, she wrote a series of devotional meditations which consisted of 912 folios.

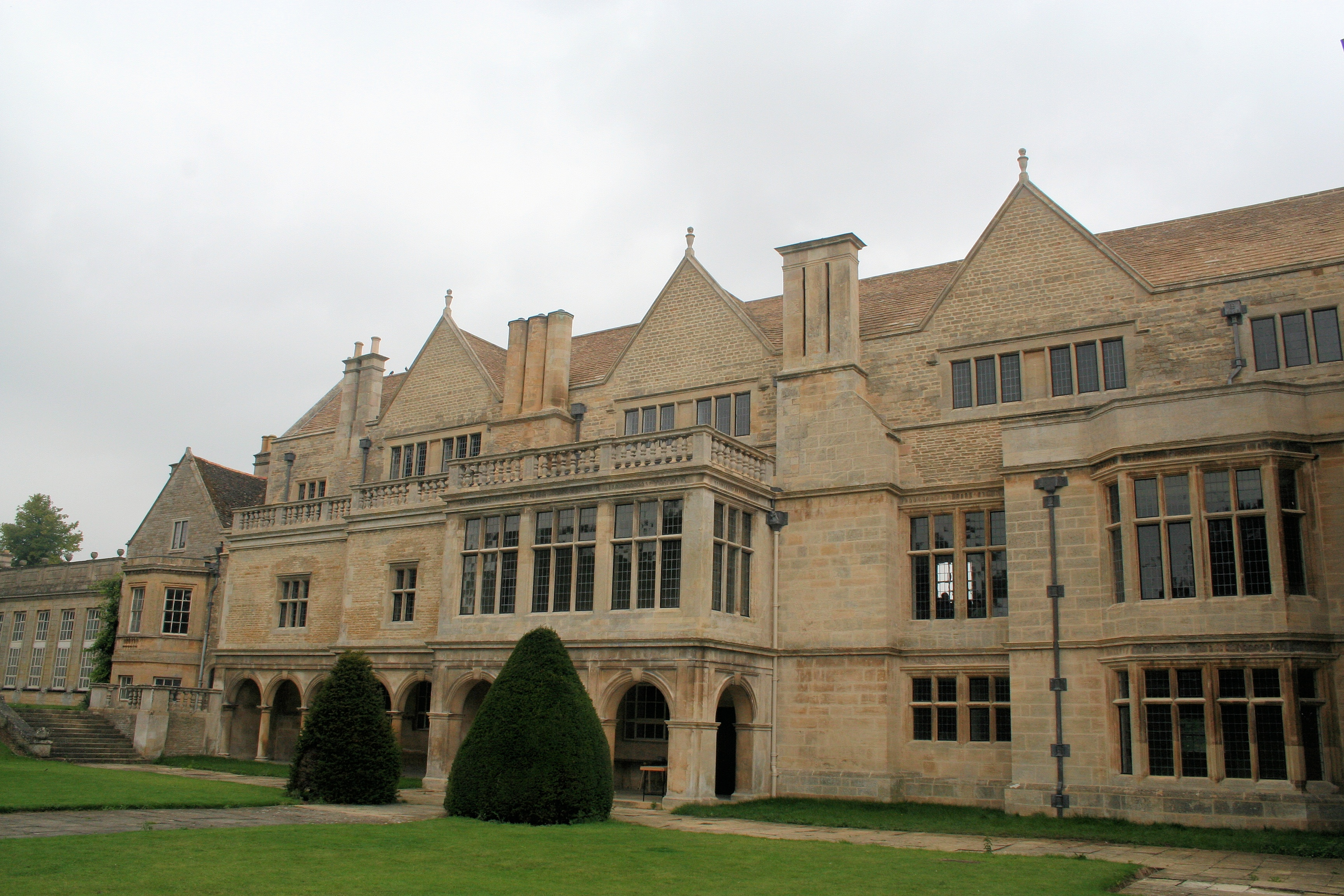
Apethorpe Hall, Apethorpe, Northamptonshire

In 1567, Grace married Sir Anthony Mildmay who later took up the position of ambassador to France. He was the eldest son of Walter Mildmay, who had become the Chancellor of the Exchequer the previous year. Sir Walter was instrumental in ensuring the marriage of Grace to his son, who was initially less than enthusiastic about the match. For nearly twenty years, the Mildmays lived at Apethorpe Hall in Northamptonshire with Sir Walter. Sir Anthony was often away at court, and later in France; Lady Mildmay stayed at Apethorpe and filled her time with religious devotions, music and medical practice. She oversaw the daily religious observances at Apethorpe Hall and performed charitable duties in the neighbourhood.

Her practice of medicine extended beyond the immediate family and her understanding of illnesses and cures was extensive. Her knowledge was based on Galenic theories, as well as being inspired by Christian teaching. She concocted large amounts of cures derived not only from plants, but also chemicals and minerals. Common remedies were made in batches of ten gallons at a time. One balm apparently contained 159 different seeds, roots, spices and gums, as well as 13 pounds of sugar and nuts, and over 8 gallons of oil, wine and vinegar.

Her daughter, Mary, inherited from her medical books, more than two thousand loose medical papers and an extensive array of curatives. The Mildmays experienced financial difficulties during their marriage, in part because of debt incurred by Sir Anthony's political and military activities. Sir Henry Sharington died in 1581 leaving his two surviving children, Grace and Olive, in dispute over their inheritance for many years (Ursula had died in 1576). According to Lady Mildmay's memoirs, Olive and other family members had convinced Sir Henry to change his will, reducing Grace's share. This last will had been a nuncupative one and Lady Mildmay ultimately won an equal share of the inheritance. Her husband later quarrelled with his brother Humphrey over their inheritance, and for a long time the couple lived with the worry that Sir Anthony would predecease his father. These financial worries disappeared after Sir Anthony successfully sued his brother for some of his land.

Sir Anthony died in 1617. Lady Mildmay died on 27 July 1620 and was buried at Apethorpe church, next to her husband. Their only child, Mary Mildmay, married Francis Fane, 1st Earl of Westmorland, and had 14 children including Mildmay, Francis, Rachael and George Fane.

Lady Mildmay's autobiography—one of the earliest by an English woman still in existence—was written in italic script with revisions and corrections in secretary hand. Excerpts were first published in 1911 by Rachel Weigall.

The inscription on her monument in St Leonards reads;

"Here also lyeth Grace, Lady Mildmay, the only wife of the said Anthony Mildmay, one of the heirs of Sir Henry Sharington, knight of Lacock, in the County of Wiltshire, who lived 50 years married to him, and three years a widow after him; she was most devout, unspotteddly chaste maid, wife, and widow; compassionate in heart, and charitably helpful with physic, clothes, nourishment, orcounsels to any in misery. She was most careful and wise in managing worldly estate so as her life was a blessing to her, and her death she blessed them."
