= List of Christopher Whall works in Scotland =

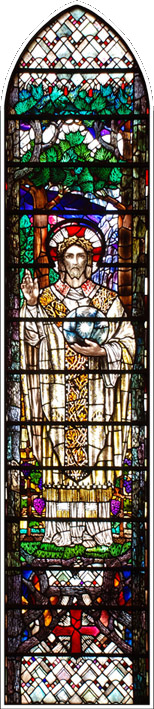
Centre light of three-light window in Dornoch Cathedral.

This is a list of the stained glass works of Christopher Whall (1849–1924) in Scotland reflecting Whall's intent to reflect the inspiration of nature in this art.

Whall's works also include:

- Gloucester Cathedral
- War Memorial windows
- Cathedrals and Minsters windows

Church	Location	Date(s)	Subject, notes and references
Douglas Castle	Douglas, Lanarkshire	1894 to 1896	Henry Wilson was commissioned to decorate the Earl of Douglas's private chapel and chose Whall to assist. Whall painted the panelled ceiling and the panels for Wilson's altar-piece. He also designed stained glass for the windows on the north side of the chapel. The chapel was demolished in 1960 but Whall's windows were saved and are now in St Sophia's Episcopal Church in the village of Douglas. The windows depict the coats of arms of the Douglas family from earliest times. The foliage in the lower part of the windows is based on the lyric - The Oak and the Ash and the Bonny Ivy tree, which flourish in my home in the North Countree.
Clark Memorial Church (United Presbyterian Church)	Largs, Ayrshire	1890	This church has a rich interior with hammerbeam roof, an organ by Willis, and stained glass by Whall, Stephen Adam and William Meikle & Sons. It was the artist John Guthrie, associated with the Glasgow Boys, who commissioned Whall to design a series of windows for this church in 1890. The church was given by John Clark of the Anchor Thread Mills, Paisley, and designed by William Kerr of T G Abercrombie. It is in red sandstone from Locharbriggs and Corsehill. Whall designed four large two-light windows. Subjects include the Vision of Samuel, the Thanksgiving and Sacrifice of Noah, the Sacrifice of Abraham and the Good Samaritan.
Falkirk Old Parish Church	Falkirk	1897	This church merged with St Modan in 1986. It has two central north windows by Whall dating from 1897. These windows were the result of a legacy from Mr. Archibald Melville and are in memory of his father John Melville of Kersehill and his wife and child who had predeceased him. The subject of the windows is Love fulfilling the Law: In the first instance the theme is our duty to God (the Love of God) and in the second our duty to Man (Love of our Neighbour). The windows include depictions of Abel, Abraham, Moses and David as well as the Good Samaritan.
Dalwyck Church	Dalwyck, Scottish Borders	1897	The chapel of Dawyck House, sometimes known as Dalwyck Church, contains a three-light north window by Whall dating from 1897, this commissioned by members of the Nasmyth and Balfour families to commemorate E.R. Balfour. The subjects depicted in the window are David the Shepherd, Christ by the Sea of Galilee, and Jonathan with his Attendant.
Kirkmichael Parish Church	Kirkmichael, Perthshire	1899	Single light window depicts "Christ blessing the Children".
St Nicholas East	Aberdeen	1899	Whall designed the east window in the church's St Mary's Chapel. This has been described as one of the finest Arts and Crafts windows in Scotland. It features a Pietà and is in memory of Dr. James Cooper.
The Chapel of St Colm and St Margaret	Walls and Flotta, Orkney	1900	This chapel was originally the Episcopal chapel for Melsetter House, and was a William Richard Lethaby, Arts and Crafts building, as was Melsetter House. The chapel has two lights by Whall on the South wall. They depict St Margaret and St Colm. The chapel was Lethaby's first experiment with concrete as a structural material.
Chapel of Fettes College	Edinburgh, Lothian	1899	The Whall window is situated on the east side of the chapel (which faces north). It is a three-light window with Christ the Good Shepherd in the middle light, flanked by two angels in each of the other lights. Below the three windows are the words: "He shall feed his flock like a shepherd"; "He shall gather the lambs with his arm" and "Come unto him and he will give you rest". There is also a dedication "In loving memory of John Kerr Anderson died 17th February 1848 aged 18."
Bowden and Melrose Parish Church	Melrose, Scottish Borders	1908	The three-light Whall window in the chancel of this church dates from 1908 and was a gift from Mr. Roberts of Drygrange in memory of his wife. In the light to the left, St Margaret, Mother of King David 1, is depicted and in the light to the right is St Cuthbert attired as a bishop. The dominating feature of the central light is the crucifixion with a weeping angel at the foot of the cross. Whall also features the sun in eclipse, as appropriate to the crucifixion, the moon, the Holy City and the city wall with the straitgate and the broadgate. Below these and on the left is the Tree of Good and Evil from the Garden of Eden, and on the right the Tree of Life, the tallest and an olive tree. Level with the base of the cross, Whall includes a frieze of spring flowers.
Sorbie Parish Church, also known as Millisle Church	Millisle	1915	This church contains Whall's Sir Malcolm Donald McEacharn window. The original drawings of the window can be seen in the National Gallery, London. The McEacharn window dates to 1915. Many critics regard this window as one of Whall's best works.
Alloway Parish Church	Alloway.Ayrshire	1922	Must have been one of Whall's last windows. It was installed by Guthrie and Wells. Situated on the east wall of the south transept, the window depicts a nativity scene. Joseph kneels to kiss the hand of the infant Jesus who is held by Mary. In his Through a Glass Brightly, J Walter McGinty writes "The supporting roof timbers are a foreshadowing of the cross, while above are the angels and the light from heaven. Outside the stable can be seen, on the right a robin and on the left the garden and tomb, while faintly visible in the distance is a church." The window was a gift from Mrs. I. Barr-Smith of South Australia in memory of her parents, Alexander and Christina Mitchell of Sauchrie.
