= List of Christopher Whall works in cathedrals and minsters =

This is a list of the stained glass works of Christopher Whall (1849–1924) in cathedrals and minsters, reflecting Whall's intent to reflect the inspiration of nature in this art.

To experience the Lady Chapel is rather like being inside a great jewelled casket, for the glazing combines a profusion of deep, vibrant colours with a sparkling, silvery framework of canopies in pure white glass. The effect is cleverly achieved by a judicious "orchestration" of colour-harmonies in the selection of raw material. In Whall's evocative words, the artist-craftsman 'tries all his effects in the glass itself; he sketches in glass. He has all the colours burning round him, singing to him to use them, sounding all their chords. "This looks better". "That is a pleasant harmony." "Ah! But this makes it sing!"

— Whall's words in regard to Gloucester Cathedral, from Aglo with resplendent colour

Whall's other works include:

- Gloucester Cathedral
- War Memorial windows
- Works in Scotland

== Works in cathedrals and minsters ==
Church	Location	Date(s)	Subject, notes and references
Gloucester Cathedral	Gloucester, Gloucestershire	1899 to 1913	The work at Gloucester Cathedral was Whall’s largest commission and the work was completed over several years. A final half window was added by his daughter in 1926. The series of windows installed by Whall in the Lady Chapel is acknowledged to be the finest glass of the period in England. First in the series is the "Fall of Man" from 1899, showing the Garden of Eden. Central to Whall's scheme are scenes from the life of the Virgin Mary. In the "Nativity", shepherds and kings kneel in adoration before Mary and the Christ Child against a snow-covered landscape. The rich colours and high quality of painting are typical of his work. In the North side of the Lady Chapel Sanctuary is "Christ in Majesty" with the Virgin and Mary Magdalene. This is a stunning example of symbolism in every aspect, with spectacular use of colour. Whall’s glass in the Lady Chapel contains images of many English saints. The detail of St Winifred (1901) includes the line of severance on her neck where she was beheaded and, at the base, the water springing up on the site of her martyrdom. The East window in the Chapter House from 1903 to 1905, is a Boer War Memorial and shows, in the upper centre, Osric, the founder of the first Christian church (about 679 AD) on the Cathedral site. Below, William the Conqueror is depicted, commissioning the Domesday Survey in 1085. The window has many figures representing Discipline, Counsel and Valour. In their book The Buildings of England Gloucestershire 2: The Vale and the Forest of Dean, David Verey and Alan Brooks wrote: "Whall’s windows exhibit a dazzling blend of jewel-like colour and drawing of the finest quality. They mostly consist of single figures of saints beneath silvery naturalistic canopies, with small scenes at the bottom, the detail of which repays close examination. He began with the north west window, beneath the bridge chapel 1898-9, then came the two central windows both north and south, completed 1901-2, the south west window, 1902, and the north east of 1909–10. That above the north Chantrey chapel is of 1913: the corresponding window, south, is by his daughter Veronica, 1926; she had assisted her father (who died in 1924) throughout the project". In the south Chantry the small West window is by Whall and dates from 1921 whereas the South West window is by Veronica and dates to 1929. Some photographs of Whall’s work in Gloucester Cathedral are shown in the gallery below. These include "Man’s Fallen State", "Man’s Redemption/Eucharist" and "Christ Enthroned", all in the Lady Chapel and "Choristers" and "Church Musicians" which are part of the West window of the South Chantry of the Lady Chapel. These were installed in 1921 to commemorate a former cathedral organist. Several photographs of Whall's Gloucester Cathedral work are shown in the gallery below.
Canterbury Cathedral	Canterbury, Kent	1902	In the south transept, Whall's nine-light traceried window includes four lights which portray the Nativity and also lights depicting "The Adoration" and "Three Angels". Whall had designed another two windows for the cathedral but these were lost following German bombing. See images of parts of the Canterbury window in the gallery below.
St Brendan's Cathedral	Loughrea, County Galway	1903	Whall completed three windows in the Cathedral's Apse.
Winchester Cathedral	Winchester, Hampshire		In the East Aisle of the Chapel of the Holy Sepulchre, Whall completed a window which was a memorial to Edward Bligh who was killed at Gallipoli in 1915. The window depicts St George, St Michael and St Hubert. Edward Henry Swinburne Bligh was a Lieutenant in the Royal Naval Volunteer Reserve. He is buried in Turkey at Lancashire Landing Cemetery. He was the son of the Rev. the Hon. Henry Bligh and the Hon. Mrs. Bligh, of Winchester. The figure of St Hubert is the same as in the Little Chasterton window although the figure is reversed.
St Martin's Cathedral	Leicester, Leicestershire	1905 and 1920	Whall completed two windows for St Martin's Cathedral in Leicester. These were an East window and a West window in the inner South Aisle. The three-light window was installed in 1905 and has St Martin in the central light. The East window, dating to 1920, is a war memorial window. In "The Buildings of England. Leicestershire and Rutland" this window was described thus "In an Expressionist style with many Pre-Raphaelite memories". The lower left-hand light features St Joan of Arc.
Worcester Cathedral	Worcester, Worcestershire	1923	Christopher and Veronica Whall, under the name Whall and Whall, were responsible for the memorial window in Worcester Cathedral which remembers Major James Baldwin who died in 1922. Baldwin was a Major in the Worcestershire Yeomanry. The window was installed in 1923 and is a three-light traceried window which depicts the passage of the soul from this earthly life to the heavenly life. The text is from Bunyan's "The Pilgrim’s Progress". The left hand light depicts the Archangel Michael as the Angel of Judgement and Spiritual Warfare. The central light has a group of Angels standing in a flowery meadow beyond the river of Death. They carry trumpets and are ready to welcome those who pass from this world. The Archangel Gabriel, the Angel of Reconciliation, appears in the third light, that to the right. The tracery includes the insignia of the units with which Major James Baldwin was associated, the Worcestershire Volunteer Regiment and the Queen’s Own Worcestershire Hussars. In their volume on Worcestershire, Nikolaus Pevsner and Alan Brooks wrote "Good Arts and Crafts". Photographs of each individual light are included in the gallery at the end of this listing.
St George’s Cathedral	Cape Town. South Africa	1908	Whall worked with Karl Parsons on the stained glass windows at this Cathedral. Parsons was a pupil of Whall. An image of one of the Cape Town windows is shown in the gallery below courtesy of Stewart Harris. There are five Whall/Parsons windows all around the Apse. Each window is in two parts, the upper scene is from the Old Testament and the lower scene from the New Testament. Thus in the window with the theme of food, the top scene features the manna falling to feed the starving Israelites whilst the bottom scene features the Last Supper. In another window the theme is temptation. In the uppermost scene Eve is tempted by the serpent and in the lower scene Jesus is taken up to a high place and offered the world by Satan. When the theme of a window is water, we have the crossing of the Red Sea in the upper part and in the lower part we see Jesus being baptised in the River Jordan by John the Baptist. Another window features sacrifice and in the bottom part Jesus makes the ultimate sacrifice; his life as he is crucified on the Cross. Finally in the window depicting homage we see in the upper scene, the Queen of Sheba bowing down before King Solomon whilst in the bottom scene, the Magi bow before the infant Jesus. This latter window was almost certainly entirely the work of Karl Parsons.
St Alban's Cathedral	Pretoria, South Africa	1918	Whall designed two windows here, "Christ healing the sick" and "Solomon building the Temple". The windows were commissioned by Herbert Baker, the Cathedral architect. Baker had previously commissioned Whall and Karl Parsons to design windows for St George's Cathedral in Cape Town and Baker also commissioned Whall to design the memorial window in memory of his father-in-law in the Nurstead church.
Dornoch Cathedral	Dornoch, Sutherland	1913	Cathedral has a Whall window titled "Faith, Love and Hope". This dates to 1913. It has the "Trinity" represented above the three main lights. This is a much restored and partially rebuilt C13 cathedral church of the Diocese of Caithness.
Southwell Minster	Southwell, Nottinghamshire	1906	Whall completed a two-light window for the Minster. One light covered the "Crucifixion" and the second "An Angel and St John on Patmos". This window is in the Chapel of Christ the Light of the World. In some notes on two of Whall's sketch designs for these windows, Peter Cormack wrote that Whall's design for a crucifixion window was a good example of his respect for the iron framework to which the panels of stained glass are affixed. He feels that the absence of tracery gives the iron- work a particular prominence, and the upright bars, resembling spears. have an expressive function which Whall exploits in his composition. On the second light Cormack wrote that the subject of the window, the vision of St. John the Divine on the Isle of Patmos, was another of Whall’s favourite subjects – indeed the Book of Revelations (sic) was a constant source of iconography – and it features in the window at Burford and, most dramatically, in the designs for Christchurch Priory. In his "The stained glass of Southwell Minster" written in 1988, John Beaumont writes- The Crucifixion. Whall has shown Our Lord on the cross, surrounded by a glory or mandala. Above the cross beam is seen the mocking label 'INRI' (Jesus of Nazareth king of the Jews). Above his head both the sun and the moon can be seen although the sun is darkened. This was a way of indicating that some great event was taking place, as although the moon can be in the sky at the same time as the sun, it cannot normally be seen in the middle of the day when it is near the sun. On Christ's right hand is his mother, and on his left St John. The words recorded are those of Jesus just before he died 'Woman, behold your son!' and 'Behold your mother!' when he gave his mother into the care of John, the beloved disciple. Apocryphal writings record that Mary stayed in the home of John until her death. (Luke 23.44; John 19.26-28.) Below, the panel depicts the ram caught in the thicket, part of the story of the sacrifice of Isaac. This is a reference to an Old Testament event foreshadowing the sacrifice of Christ on the cross. 'God will provide himself the lamb for a burnt offering, my son'. (Genesis 22.8-14." — quotation from John Beaumont St John on Patmos: Patmos, a sterile island in the Aegean Sea, is where the angel came to John telling him to record his vision, the vision that we can now read as the Apocalypse, the Revelation to St John. John kneels on a sea-bound cliff top to the right of the panel, and is addressed by the angel. Below is shown the Lamb with the book with seven seals and at the apex is an image of the New Jerusalem. (Revelation 1.1; 1.9; 6.1; 21.10.). The Inscription reads- "In piam memoriam Joannis Noble de Little Over in Com de Darby Arm/ qui apud Kendal in Com de Westmorland die VII Apr AD MDCCCXXVIII natus / die XV Nov AD MDCCCXCVI apud Little Over mortuus est has fenestras dedicavit / filius eius natu maximus Gulielmus Jacobus Noble Templi Interioris Socius" — Window inscription Images are shown in the gallery below shown courtesy Mary and Malcolm Stacey.

== Gallery ==
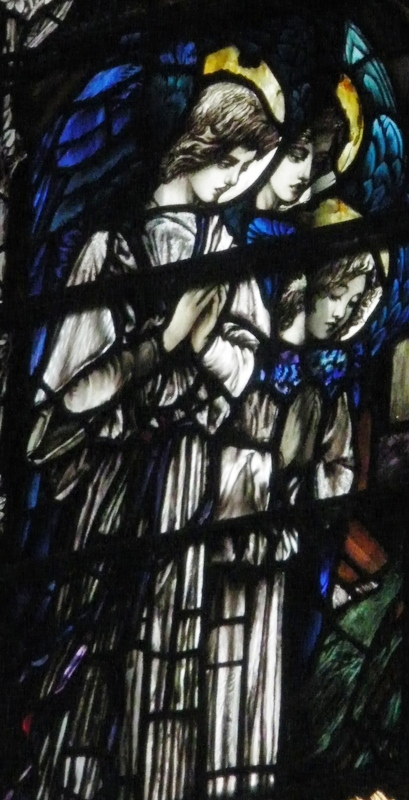
"Three Angels"- Part of Canterbury Cathedral window

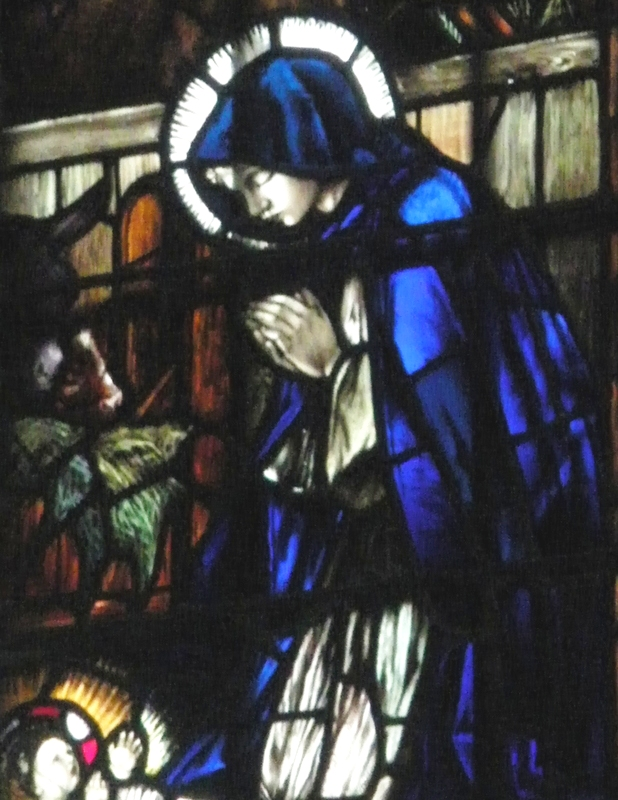
"The Adoration"- Part of Canterbury Cathedral window

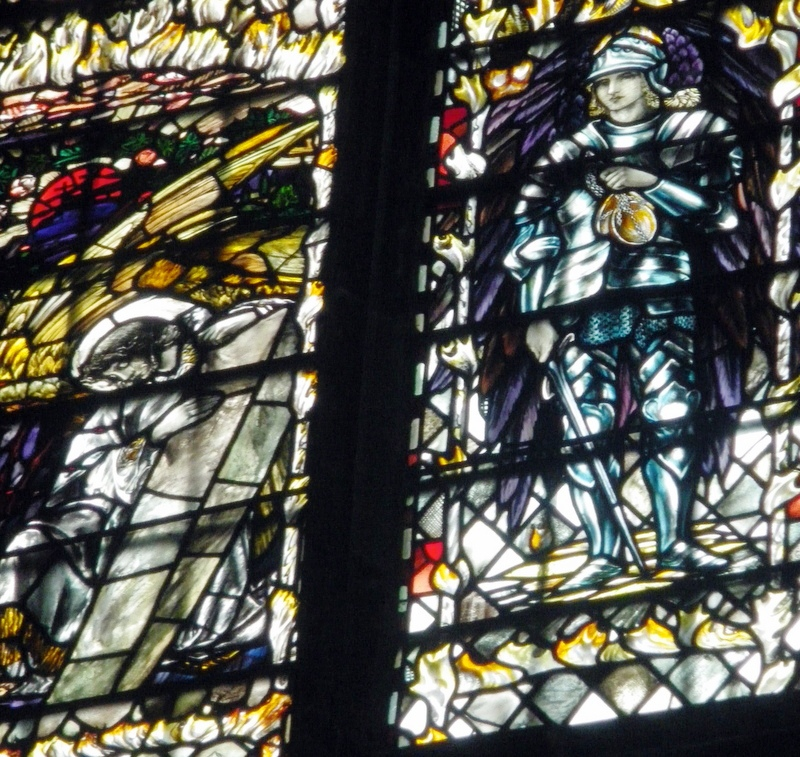
Part Canterbury Cathedral window

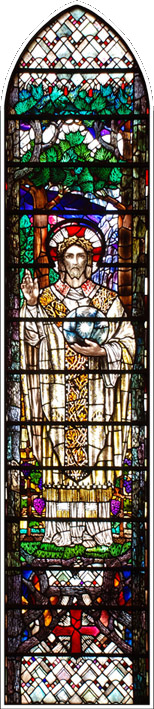
Centre light of three-light window in Dornoch Cathedral shown courtesy David Geddes and Tony Rundle.

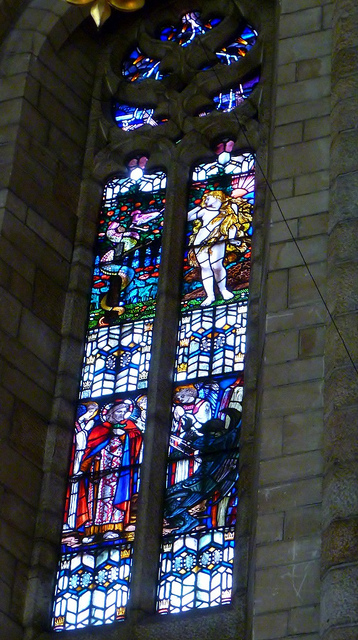
Window in Cape Town Cathedral. Shown courtesy Stewart Harris.

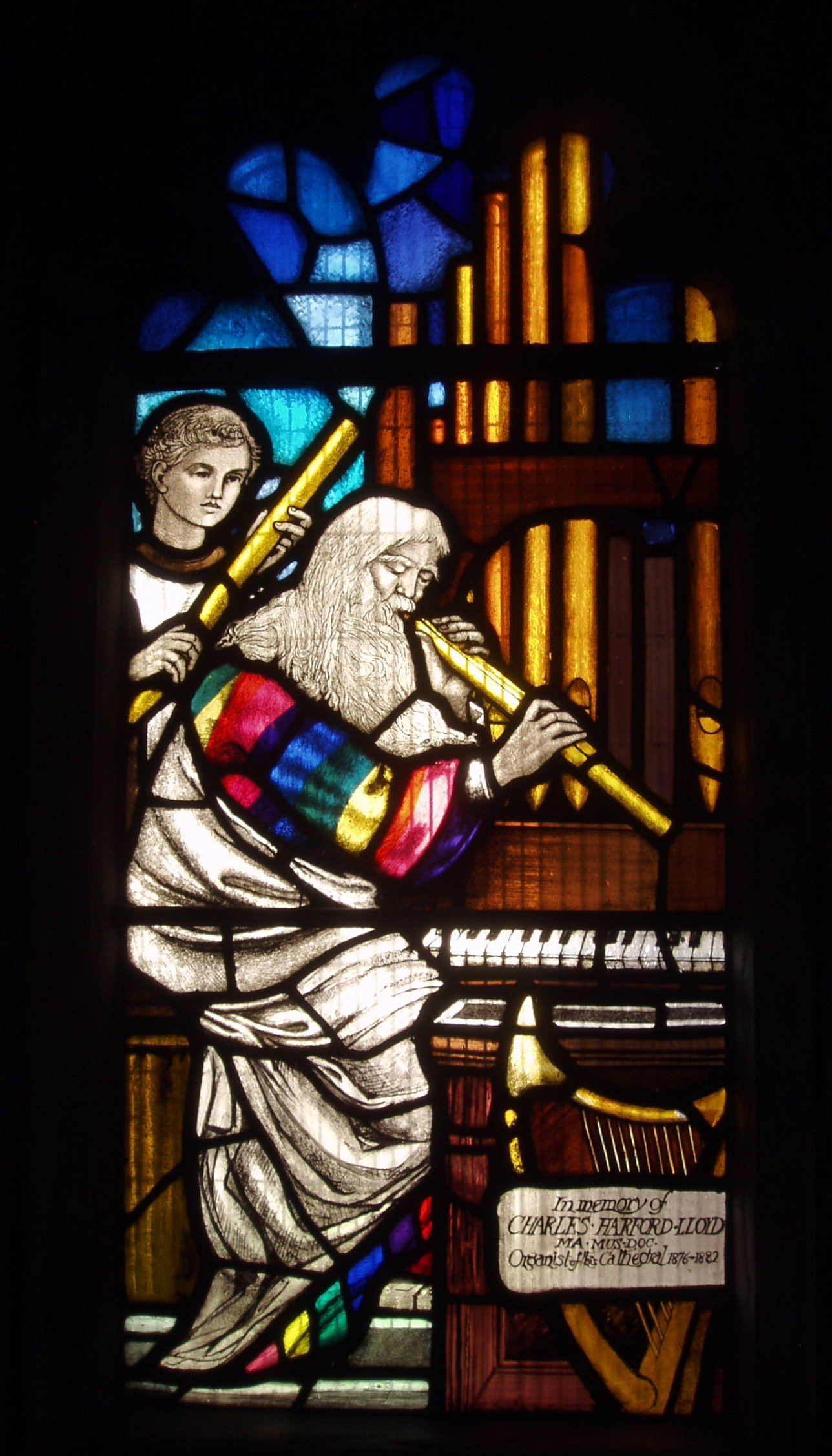
"Church Musicians". Whall window in Gloucester Cathedral. Image courtesy of Aidan McRae Thomson.

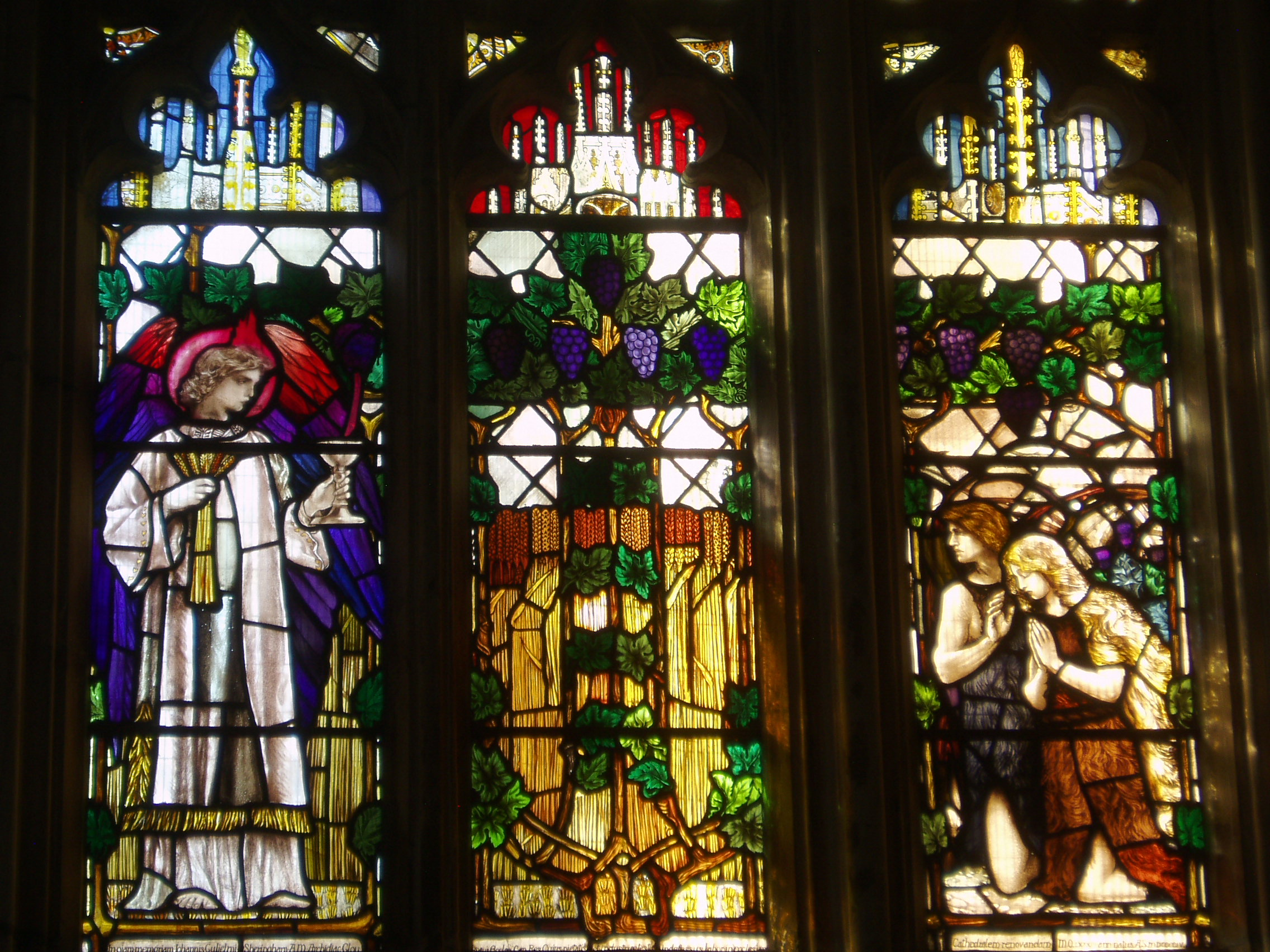
"Man's Redemption/Eucharist". Gloucester Cathedral. Image courtesy of Aidan McRae Thomson.

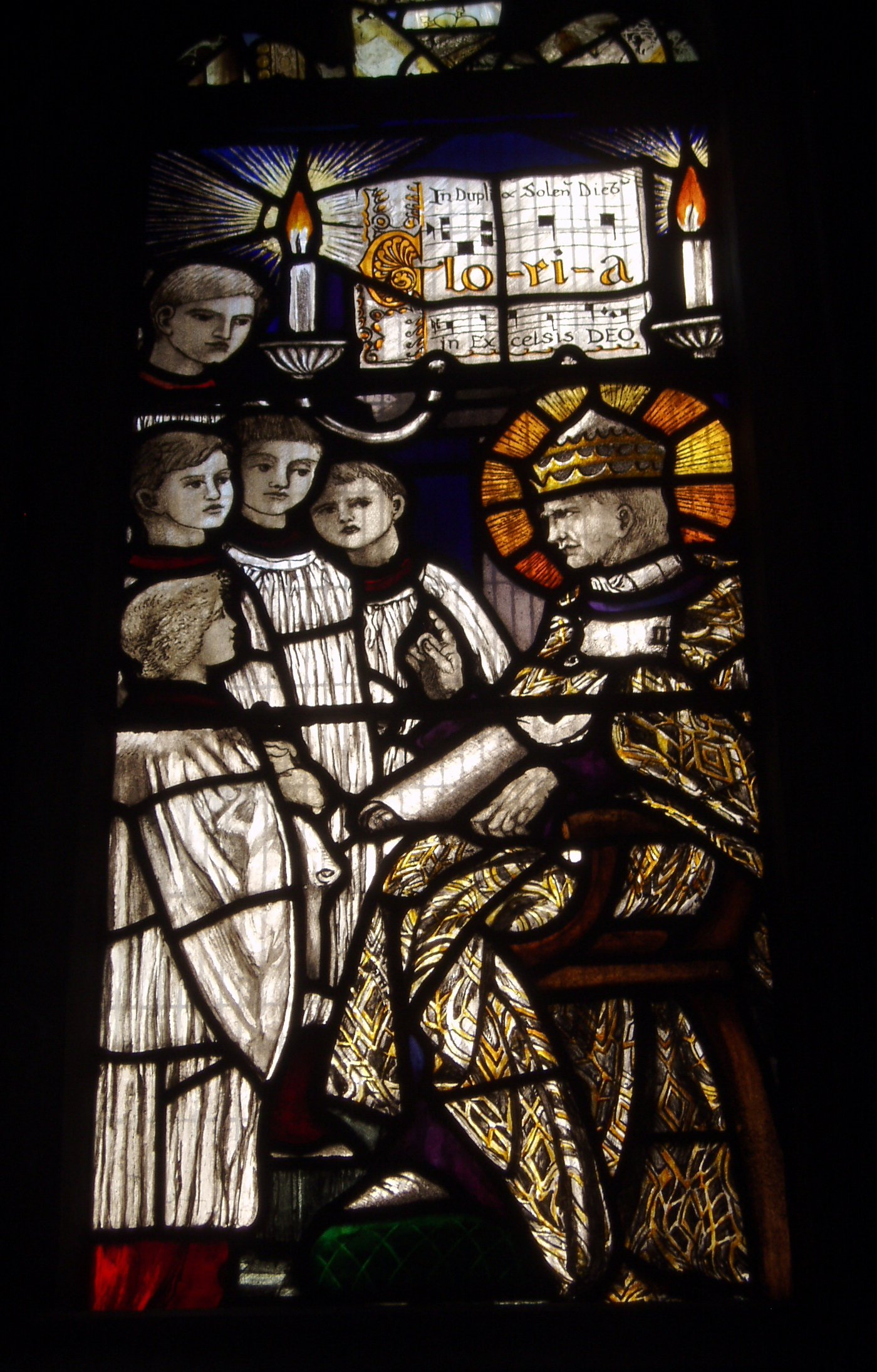
"Choristers". Gloucester Cathedral. Image courtesy of Aidan McRae Thomson.

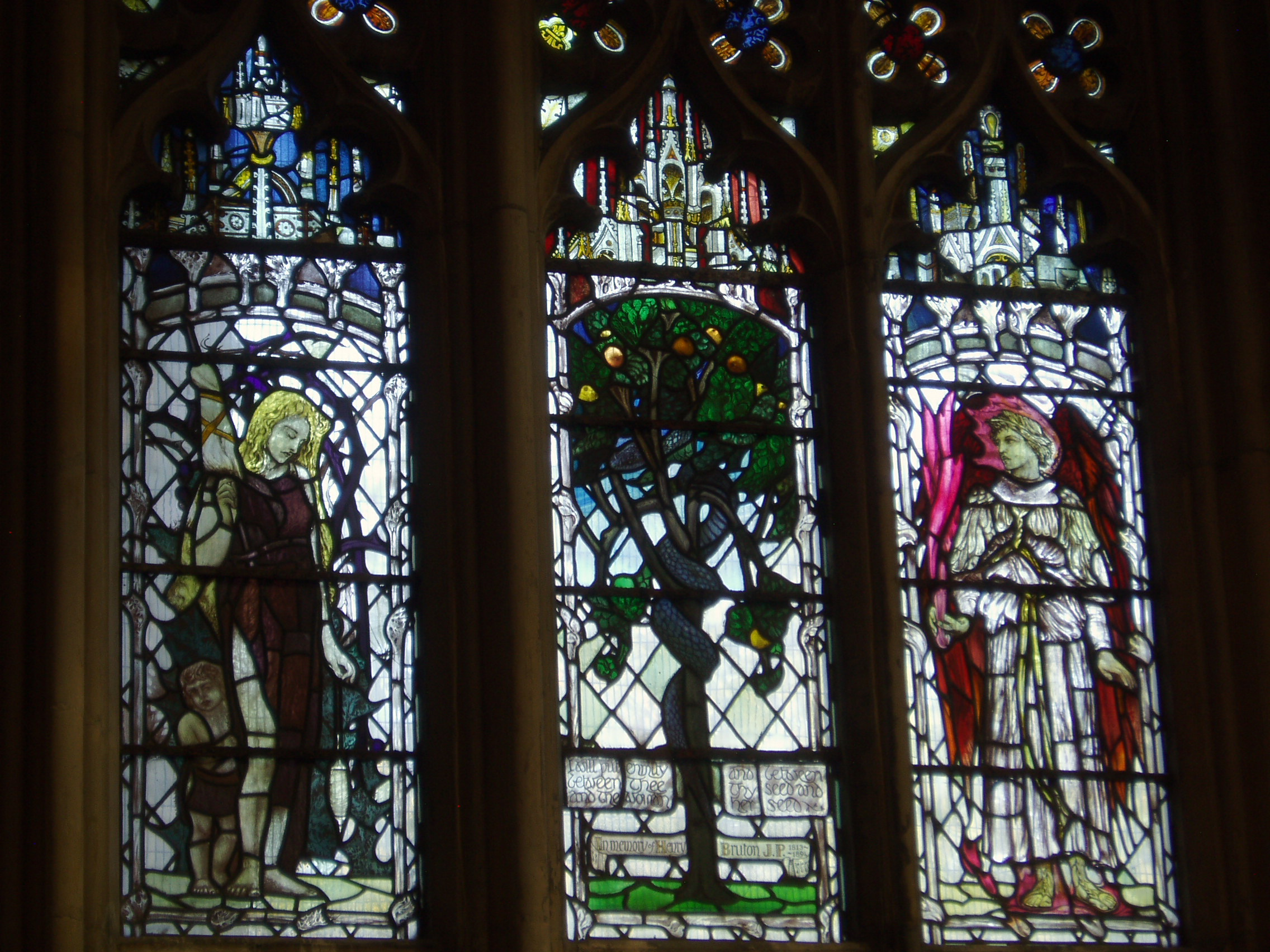
"Man's Fallen State". Gloucester Cathedral. Image courtesy of Aidan McRae Thomson.

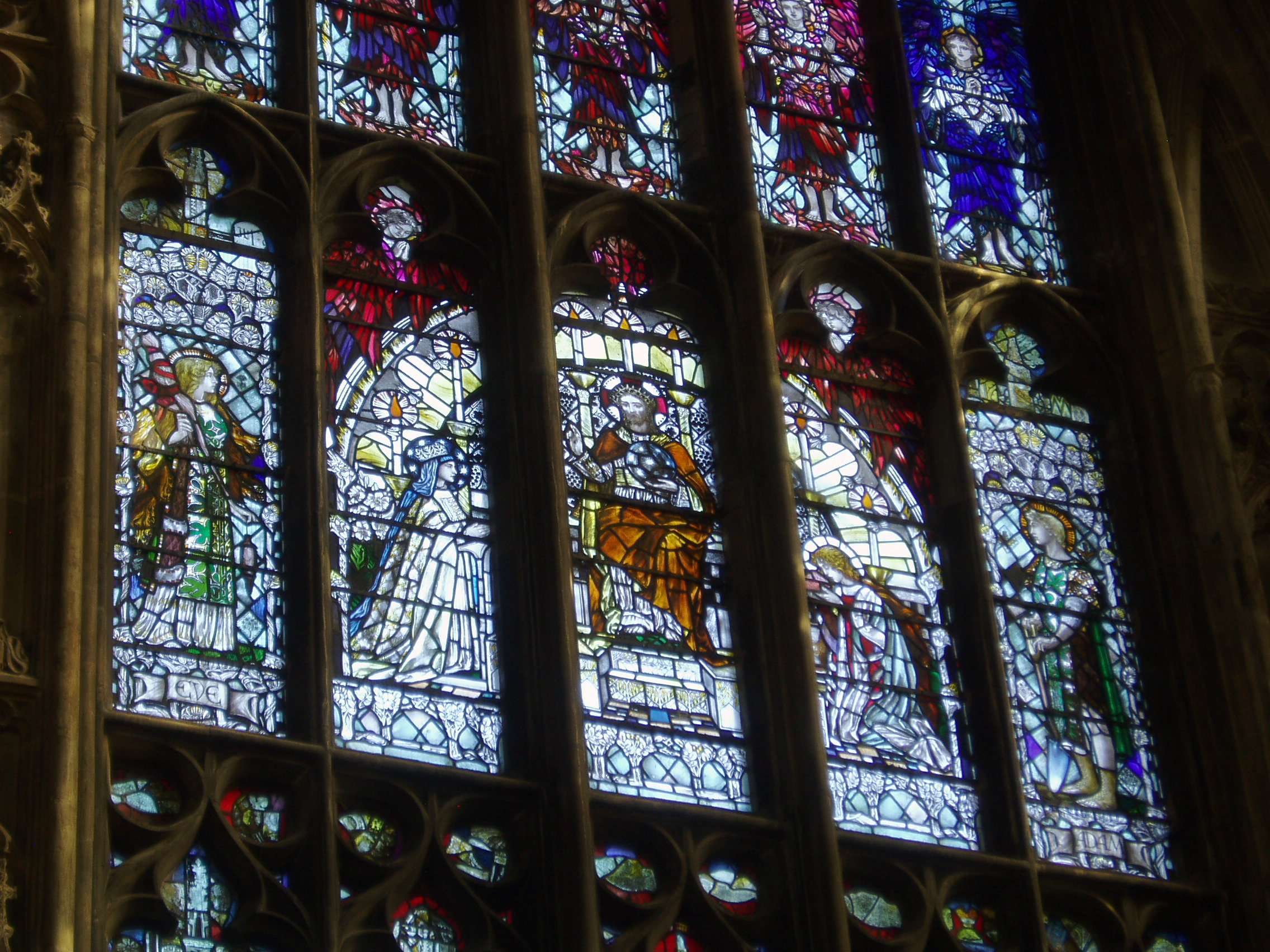
"Christ Enthroned". Gloucester Cathedral. Image courtesy of Aidan McRae Thomson.
