= St Leonard's Church, Apethorpe =

Coordinates: 52.5495°N 0.4898°W

St Leonard's, Apethorpe
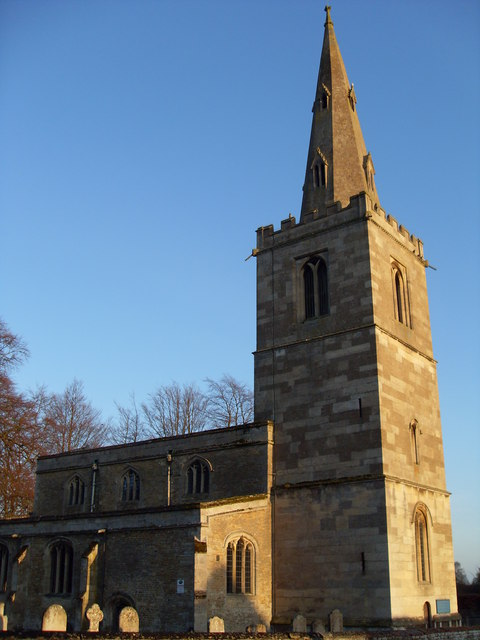

- Location in Northamptonshire
- Location: Apethorpe, Northamptonshire
- Country: England
- Denomination: Anglican

Architecture
- Functional status: Active
- Heritage designation: Grade I
- Designated: 23 May 1967

Administration
- Province: Canterbury
- Diocese: Peterborough
- Archdeaconry: Oakham
- Deanery: Oundle

St Leonard's Church is an Anglican church in the village of Apethorpe in Northamptonshire, England. It is an active parish church in the Diocese of Peterborough. It has been designated a Grade I listed building by English Heritage.

== History ==
The church at Apethorpe dates mostly from the 14th or 15th century, although there may have been an earlier structure on the site. A chapel and tower were added in the 17th century and the tower was restored in the 19th century. The church was designated a Grade I listed building by English Heritage on 23 May 1967. The Grade I listing is for buildings "of exceptional interest, sometimes considered to be internationally important".

== Architecture ==
=== Exterior ===
The church is constructed of coursed limestone with ashlar dressings; the roofs are lead. Its plan consists of a nave with north and south aisles, chancel, a west tower, a chapel to the south and a south porch. The tower is of three stages, without buttresses. It has a battlemented parapet and is topped with an octagonal spire.

The north and south aisles, are both of three bays; both the aisles and the south chapel are supported by two-stage buttresses between each window.

=== Interior and fittings ===
The nave has a three-bay arcade with double-chamfered arches. There is an arch to the tower, which is chamfered and moulded. The chancel contains a carved corbel and the pulpit and baptismal font, which date from the 18th century.

The south chapel contains a large marble monument to Sir Anthony Mildmay (d. 1617) and his wife Lady Grace Mildmay (d. 1620), an effigy to Sir Richard Dalton (d. 1442) and a 19th-century marble monument to John Arthur Fane, the infant son of Lord Burghersh.

=== Churchyard ===
The churchyard contains a c. 14th century limestone ashlar cross and an 18th-century limestone ashlar chest tomb, both of which have been given a Grade II listing by English Heritage.
