= Ranulph Brito =

- Other names: Le Breton
- Known for: canon of St. Paul's Cathedral, London

Ranulph Brito or Le Breton (died 1246) was a canon of St. Paul's Cathedral, London.

== Life ==
Brito is first mentioned in 1221 as a chaplain of Hubert de Burgh. During the administration of his patron he stood high in the favour of Henry III and became the king's treasurer. On the fall of Hubert in 1232, many of the officers who had been appointed through his influence were removed and their places given to countrymen of the new minister, Peter des Roches, the Poitevin bishop of Winchester.

Among those displaced was Ranulph Brito, who was accused of having misapplied the revenues which passed through his hands and was subjected to a fine of £1,000. He was also sentenced to banishment, but this penalty was afterwards remitted. Whether the charges brought against him were well founded or not, it is significant that his successor, Peter de Rievaulx (De Rivallis), is described by Matthew Paris as the "nephew or son" of the bishop of Winchester.

In 1239 a certain William, who had been sentenced to death for various crimes, tried to save his own life by bringing accusations of treason against several persons of eminent position. Ranulph Brito, who was then canon of St. Paul's, was one of those denounced, and at the king's instance he was arrested by the mayor of London and committed to Tower of London. The dean and chapter of St. Paul's, in the absence of the bishop of London, immediately pronounced a general excommunication against all who had any share in this outrage upon a member of their body, and placed the cathedral under an interdict.

The bishop of London supported the action of the chapter, and, finding the king unmoved by his remonstrances, threatened to extend the interdict to the whole of the city. The legate, the archbishop of Canterbury, and several other prelates added entreaties and menaces, and the king was obliged to yield. At first he struggled to obtain from the chapter an undertaking that the prisoner, if released, should be ready to appear when called upon to answer the charge made against him; but they refused to entertain the demand, and Ranulph was freed unconditionally.

Shortly afterwards the informer confessed that his accusations were false, and he was executed. Although admitting Ranulph's innocence of the crime of treason, Matthew Paris intimates that he had amassed a large fortune by various acts of extortion, the canons of Missenden being particularly mentioned as having suffered from his rapacity. He died suddenly in 1246, having been seized with apoplexy while watching a game of dice.

The name of Ranulph Brito has been erroneously inserted by Dugdale and others in the list of chancellors. This mistake arose from the word consiliarius, used by Matthew Paris, having been printed in Wats's edition as cancellarius.
