= Anthony Mildmay =

English diplomat

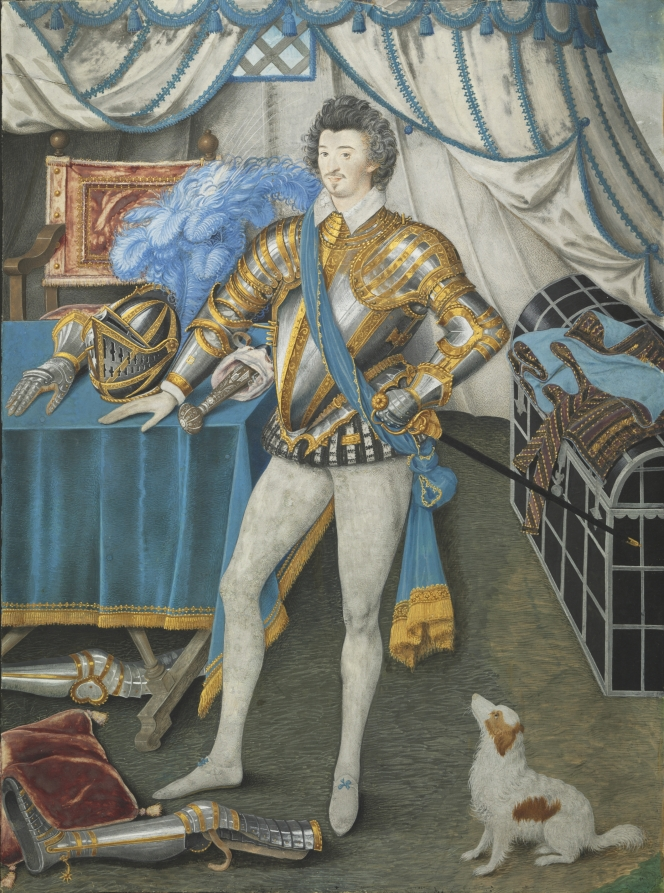
Sir Anthony Mildmay by Nicholas Hilliard, small watercolour, Cleveland Museum of Art

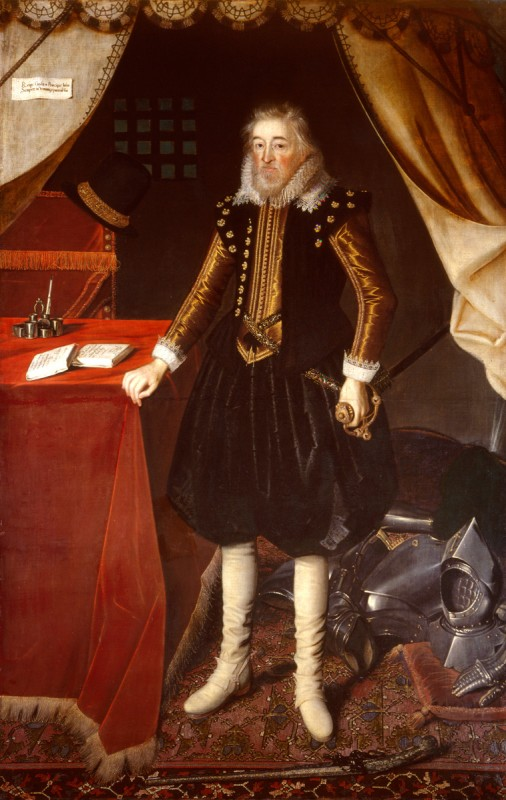
Sir Anthony Mildmay, portrait at Emmanuel College, Cambridge

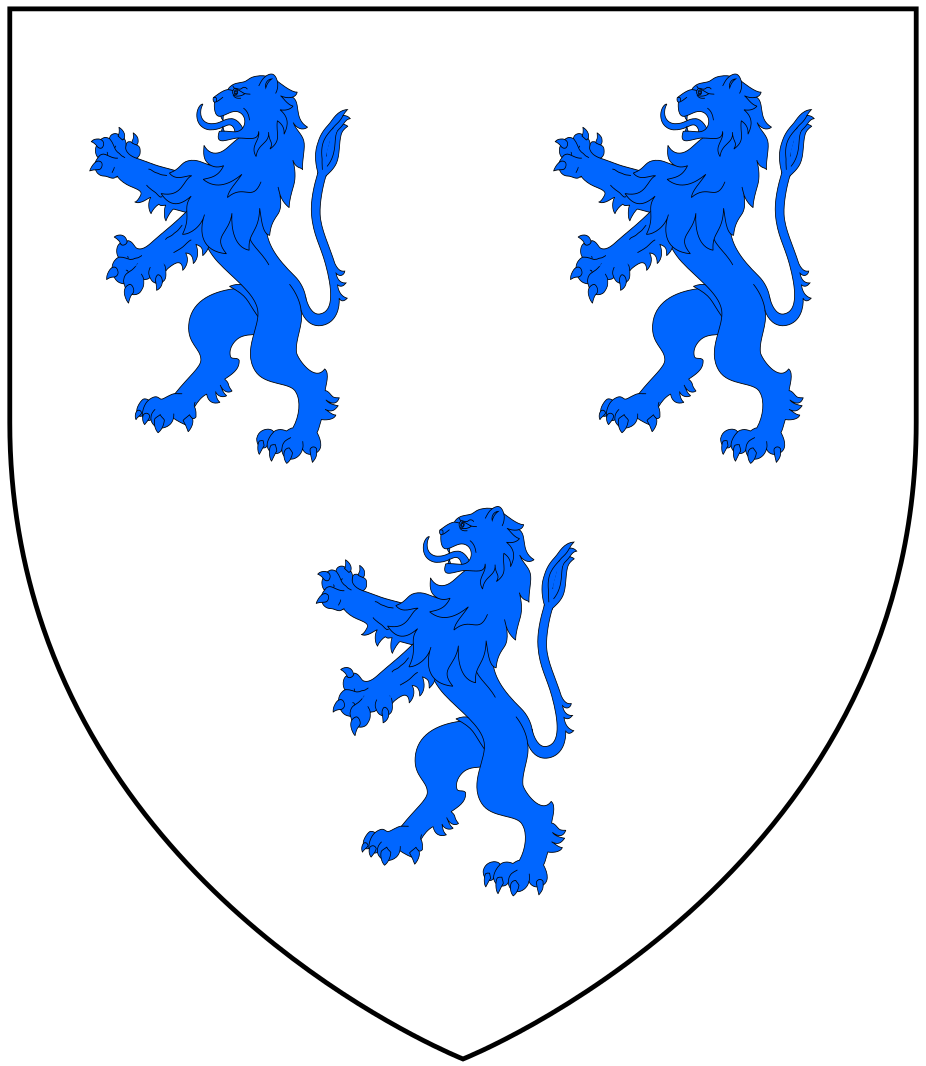
Arms of Mildmay: Argent, three lions rampant azure

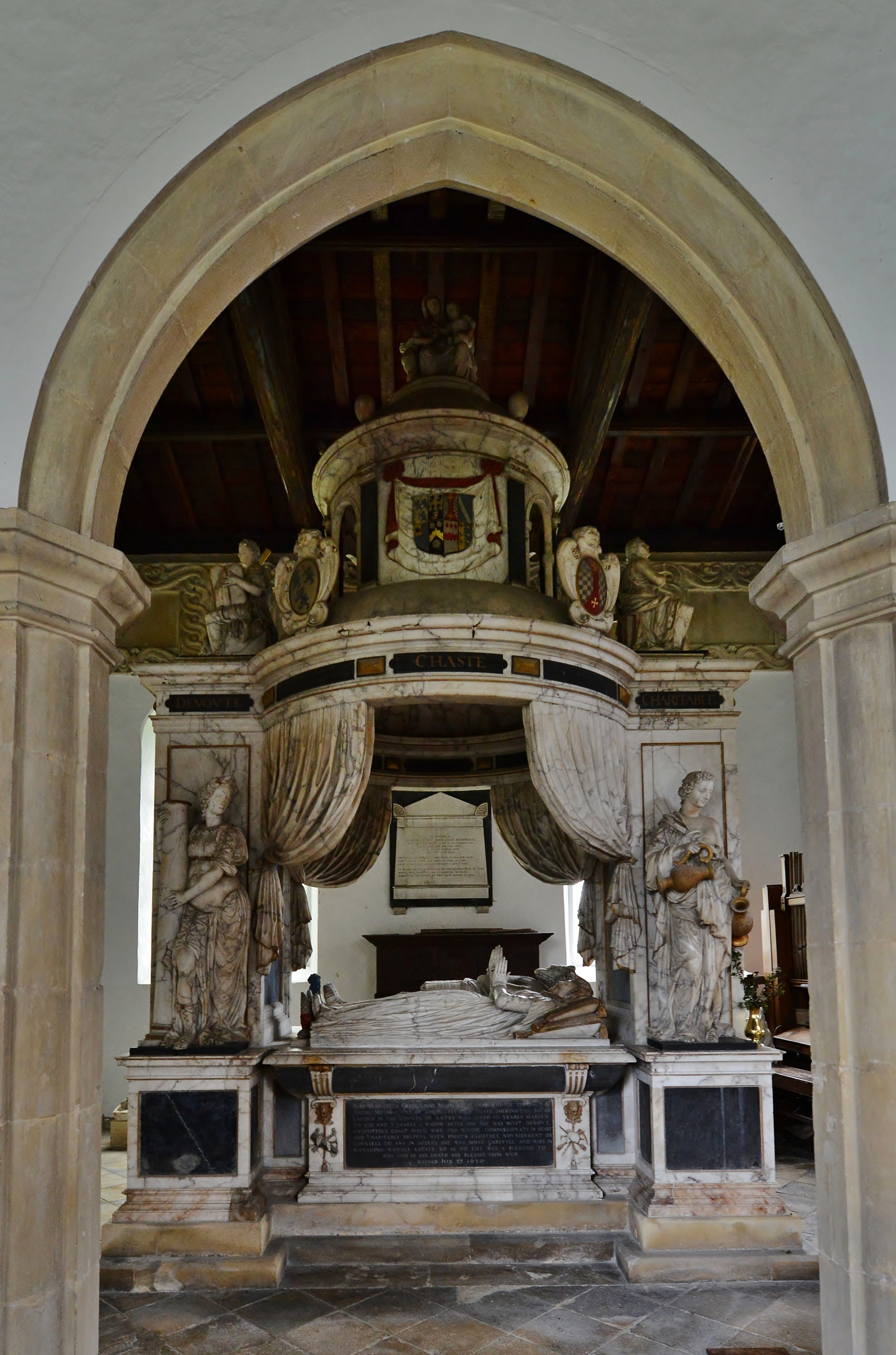
Monument to Sir Anthony Mildmay, St Leonard's Church, Apethorpe

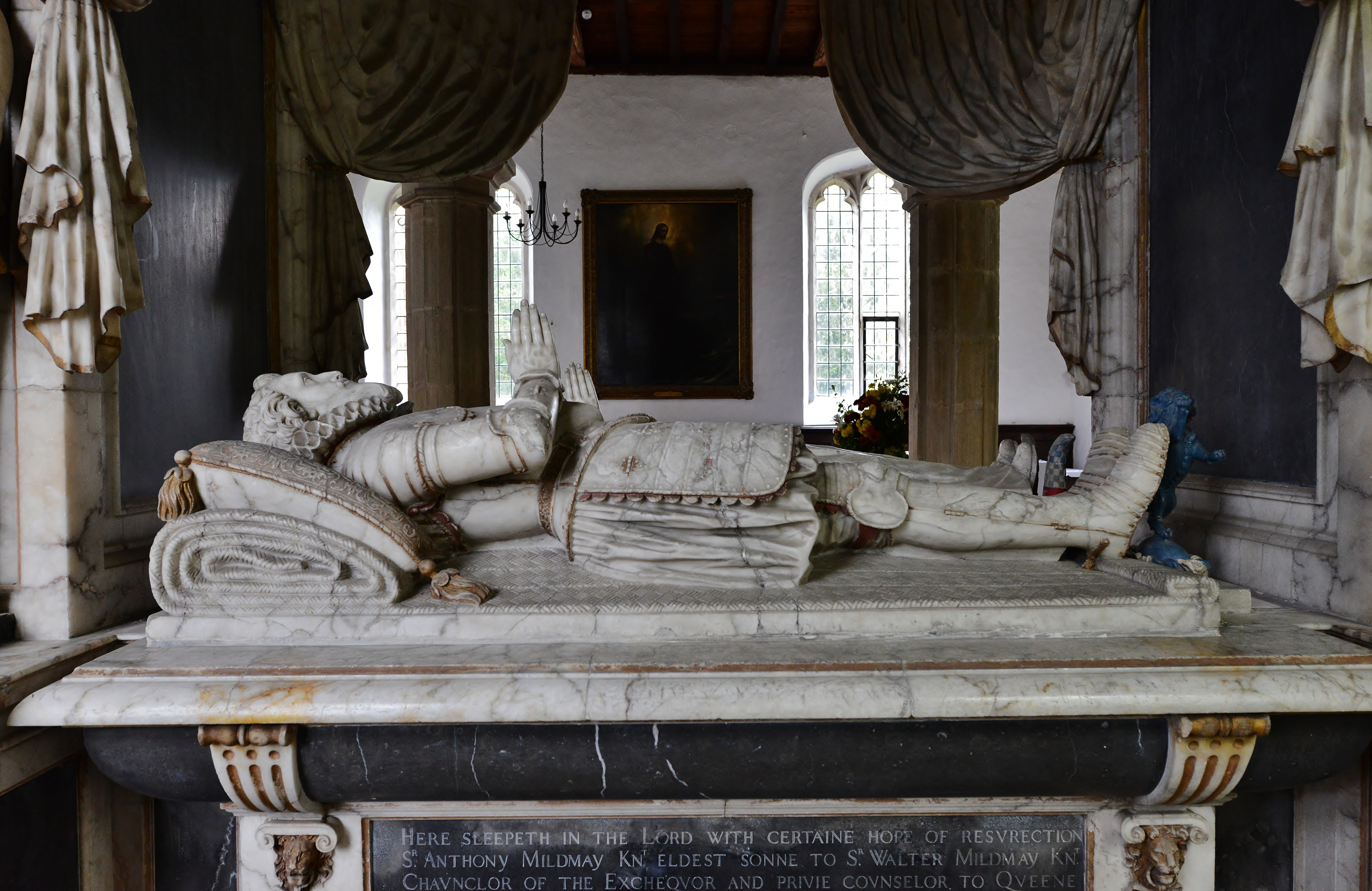
Effigy of Sir Anthony Mildmay, St Leonard's Church, Apethorpe

Sir Anthony Mildmay (died 1617) of Apethorpe Hall, Northamptonshire, served as a Member of Parliament for Wiltshire from 1584 to 1586 and as English ambassador in Paris in 1597.

== Origins ==
Mildmay was the eldest son of Sir Walter Mildmay (d.1589) of Apethorpe, Chancellor of the Exchequer to Queen Elizabeth I and founder of Emmanuel College, Cambridge, by his wife Mary Walsingham, a sister of Sir Francis Walsingham.

== Career ==
He was educated at Peterhouse, Cambridge, and delivered an oration with much success when Queen Elizabeth I visited the College on 9 August 1564. He entered Gray's Inn in 1579. He served as Sheriff of Northamptonshire for 1580 and 1592. He was a Member of Parliament for Newton in Lancashire, in 1571, and for Wiltshire from 1584 to 1586. and for Westminster in 1597.

He was knighted in 1596, when he was appointed as Ambassador to France during the reign of King Henry IV of France. "I always knew him," wrote Chamberlain soon after Mildmay had settled in Paris, "to be paucorum hominum, yet he hath ever showed himself an honourable fast frend where he found vertue and desert". The French King complained of Mildmay's ungenial manner and of the coldness with which he listened to the praises of Robert Devereux, 2nd Earl of Essex. At an interview in March 1597 Henry ordered him out of his chamber and threatened to strike him. He returned home later in the year, and declined an invitation to resume the post in 1598.

== Marriage and children ==
In 1567 he married Grace (d. 27 July 1620), a daughter and co-heiress of Sir Henry Sharington (or Sherington) of Lacock Abbey, Wiltshire, by whom he left an only child and heiress:

- Mary Mildmay, who married Francis Fane, 1st Earl of Westmorland and was the mother of Mildmay Fane, 2nd Earl of Westmorland.

== Death and burial ==
He died on 11 September 1617 and was buried in St Leonard's Church, Apethorpe, where his elaborate marble monument with recumbent effigies of himself and his wife survives. His portrait survives at Emmanuel College, Cambridge.
