= Apethorpe Palace =

- Formerly Apethorpe Hall
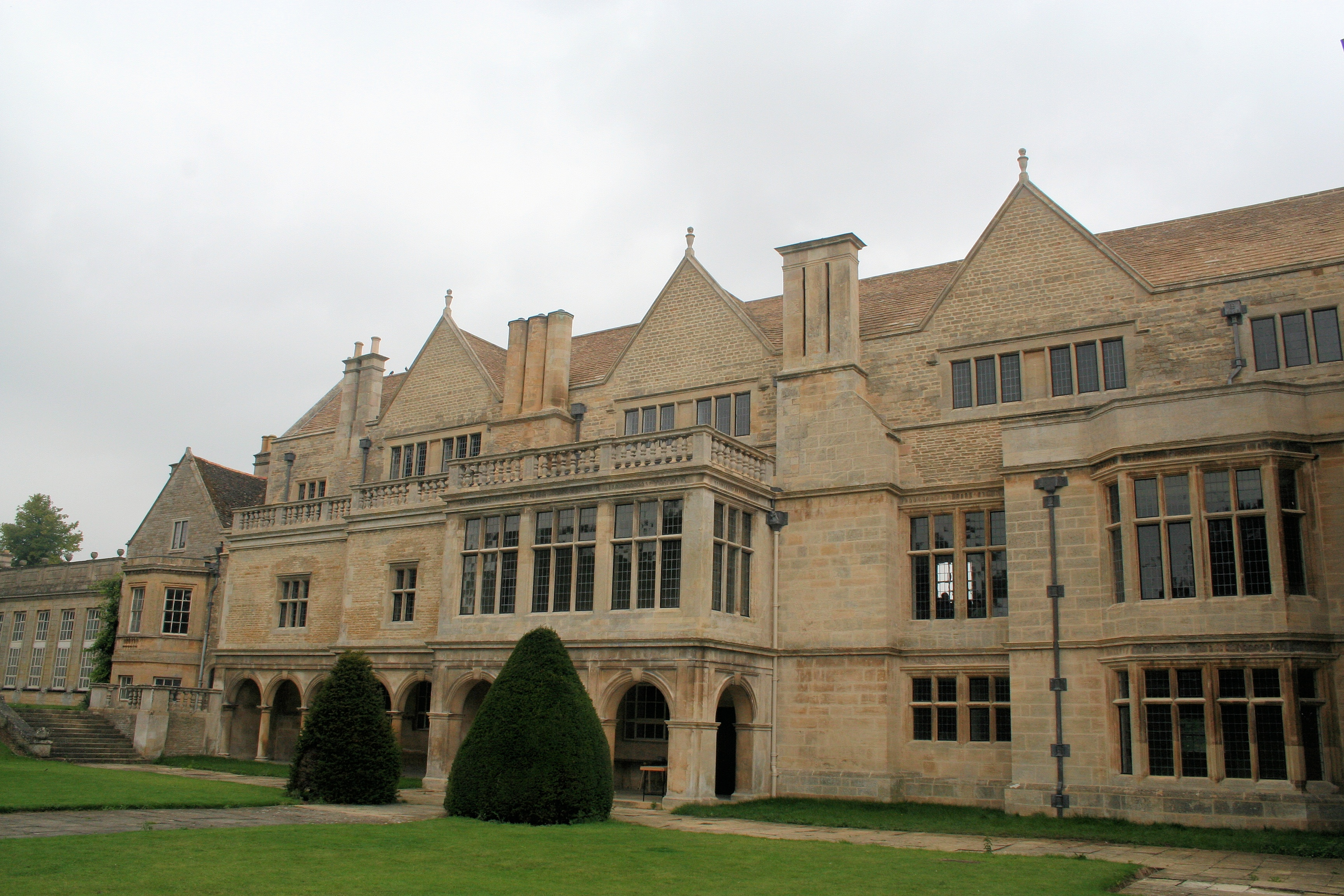
- Apethorpe Palace south elevation

Additional information
Location within Northamptonshire
52°32′50″N 0°29′32″W
| Type | Country house |
| Location | Apethorpe, Northamptonshire |
Site notes
| Area | 51,000 square feet (4,700 m^{2}) |
| Architectural styles | Tudor, Elizabethan and Jacobean |
| Restored | 1904-1923 |
| Restored by | Sir Reginald Blomfield |
| Owner | Baron von Pfetten |
| Website | english-heritage.org.uk/visit/places/apethorpe-palace |
Listed Building – Grade I
| Official name | Apethorpe Palace formerly known as Apethorpe Hall |
| Designated | 23 May 1967 |
| Reference no. | 1040083 |

Apethorpe Palace (traditionally pronounced App-thorp, and still by many, although since the latter twentieth century increasingly Ape-thorp by some), formerly known as Apethorpe Hall, is a Grade I listed country house, dating to the 15th century, close to Apethorpe, Northamptonshire. It was a "favourite royal residence" for James I. After restoration by English Heritage the house was sold in 2015 to Jean Christophe Iseux von Pfetten as his "private residence", under an arrangement where it is "open during July and August for pre-booked tours only", these managed by English Heritage.

The house is acknowledged as one of the finest remaining examples of a Jacobean stately home and one of Britain's ten best palaces. It holds a particular importance due to its ownership by, and role in entertaining, Tudor and Stuart monarchs; Elizabeth I inherited the estate from her father Henry VIII and her successor, James I, personally contributed to its 1622 extension, housing the state rooms and featuring some of the most important surviving plasterwork and fireplaces of the period. There were at least thirteen extended royal visits – more than to any other house in the county – between 1566 and 1636, and it was at Apethorpe, in August 1614, that King James met his favourite and speculated lover, George Villiers, later to become Duke of Buckingham. A series of court masques written by Ben Jonson for James I were performed while the King was in residence at Apethorpe. The house was also lived in regularly by Charles I.

== History ==
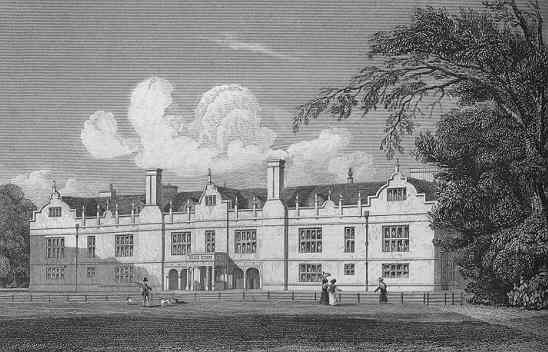
Apethorpe House in 1829

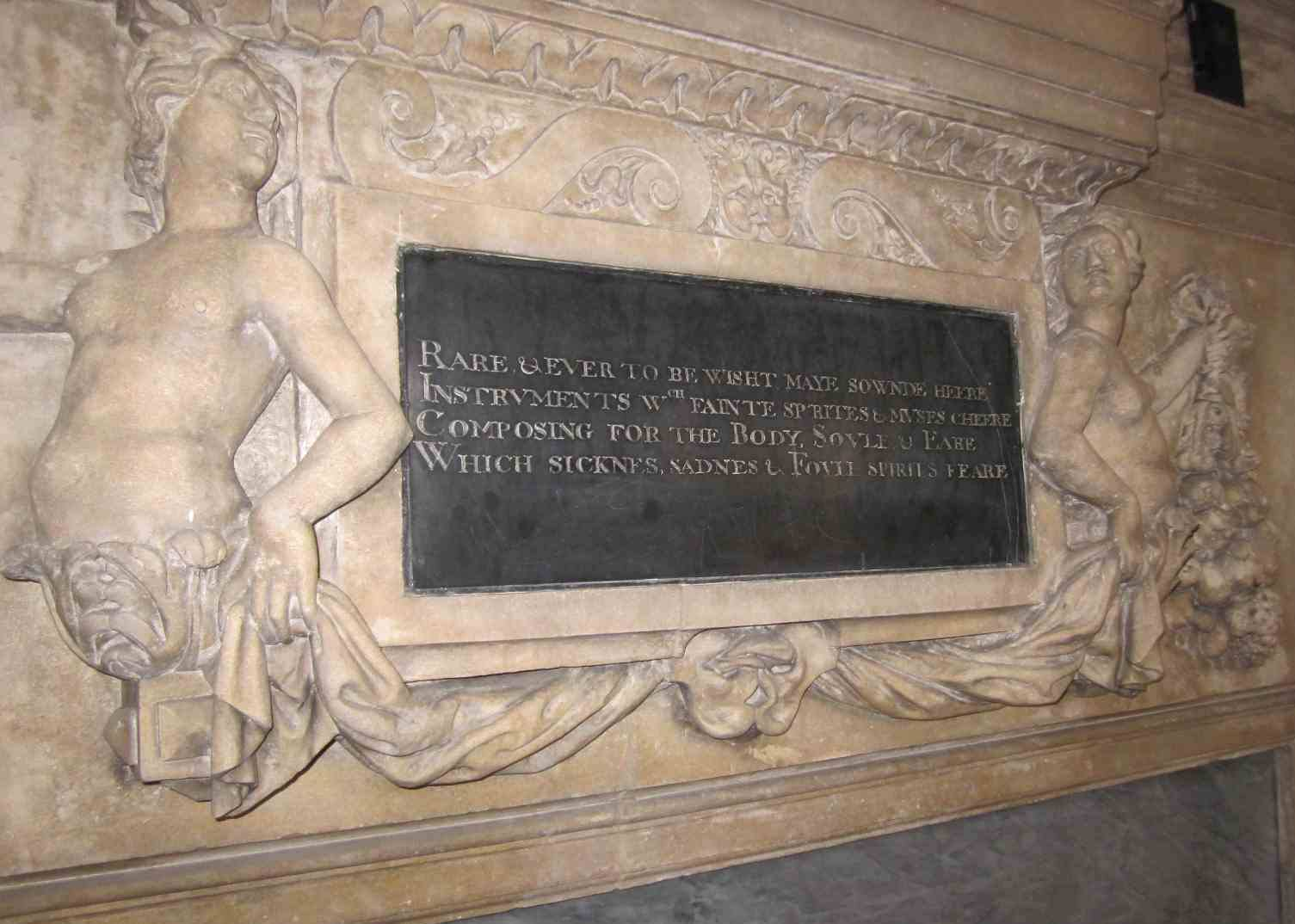
Mantlepiece in the long gallery at Apethorpe Palace

In May 1231 Henry III granted the manor of Apethorpe to Ralph le Breton; however on 21 June 1232 the manor was taken back into the king's hands. In the 15th century the manor was owned by Sir Guy Wolston. In 1515 Apethorpe was purchased by Henry Keble, grandfather of Lord Mountjoy, who sold the manor to Henry VIII.

Apethorpe was left to Princess Elizabeth in her father Henry VIII's will. In April 1551 Sir Walter Mildmay acquired it from Edward VI in exchange for property in Gloucestershire and Berkshire. Queen Elizabeth dined with Mildmay at Apethorpe on her progresses in 1562, 1566 and 1587. He added a stone chimney-piece engraved with his motto dated 1562, and after his death the house was inherited by his eldest son Sir Anthony Mildmay (c. 1549–1617), from whom Apethorpe passed to his daughter Mary (1581/2–1640) and her husband, Sir Francis Fane (1617), later Earl of Westmorland.

Mary, Countess of Westmorland, is thought to have composed the verse carved on the gallery mantelpiece:

Rare & ever to be wisht maye sownde heere
Instruments w[hi]ch fainte sp[i]rites & muses cheere
Composing for the Body, Soul, and Eare
Which sicknes, sadnes, & Foule spirits feare.

The family staged private theatricals in the house, and the teenage Rachel Fane wrote The May Masque for performance in 1627.

Apethorpe remained in the Fane family for nearly three centuries. The 12th Earl and his son came into financial difficulties and so they sold the house in 1904 to Henry Brassey. After World War II the Brassey family moved into the manor house and much of the adjoining estate was sold. The house became an approved school under the Catholic Church, but in 1982 the school closed and in 1983 the house was sold to Wanis Mohamed Burweila, who wanted to found a university in the cloisters and courtyards of Apethorpe. His plans never materialised and he left the country for political reasons, leaving the house empty. When English Heritage started its Buildings at Risk Register in 1998 the house was included on it as one of the most important houses at risk.

=== English Heritage involvement ===
In September 2004 the entire remaining estate was compulsorily purchased by the British Government under section 47 of the Planning (Listed Buildings and Conservation Areas) Act 1990. This was only the second time the government had resorted to using these powers. English Heritage spent £8 million refurbishing it to make it waterproof. Much of the work was carried out by Stamford restoration and conservation builders, E. Bowman & Sons Ltd. From 2007, buyers were sought, in spite of an estimated £6 million still required in renovation (as of 2014, the house was without any plumbing, power or heating). In 2008, the asking price had been reduced, but remained upwards of £4.5 million.

In December 2014, English Heritage announced that Baron von Pfetten, a French anglophile and keen field sportsman, had bought the property. Simon Thurley, English Heritage's chief executive, welcomed the purchase:

"Since 2000 English Heritage has consistently said that the best solution for Apethorpe is for it to be taken on by a single owner, who wants to continue to restore the house and to live in it; especially one who has experience of restoring historic buildings and is prepared to share its joys with a wide public, as Baron Pfetten will do. Apethorpe is certainly on a par with Hatfield and Knole and is by far the most important country house to have been threatened with major loss through decay since the 1950s."

Baron Pfetten agreed to publicly open the house 50 days a year for 80 years. This is much longer than the normal 10 year period for English Heritage grant-aided properties.

Before the sale English Heritage and Baron Pfetten agreed to rename the house "Apethorpe Palace" due to its royal ownership and use, along with its outstanding historic and architectural significance. In a video introducing the sale, English Heritage director Simon Thurley described the house as "the Royal Palace of Apethorpe." Since April 2015, the house has been officially registered as Apethorpe Palace in the National Heritage List. The decision was met with some concern. Since 2015 the palace has been undergoing renovation works.

== Architecture and gardens ==
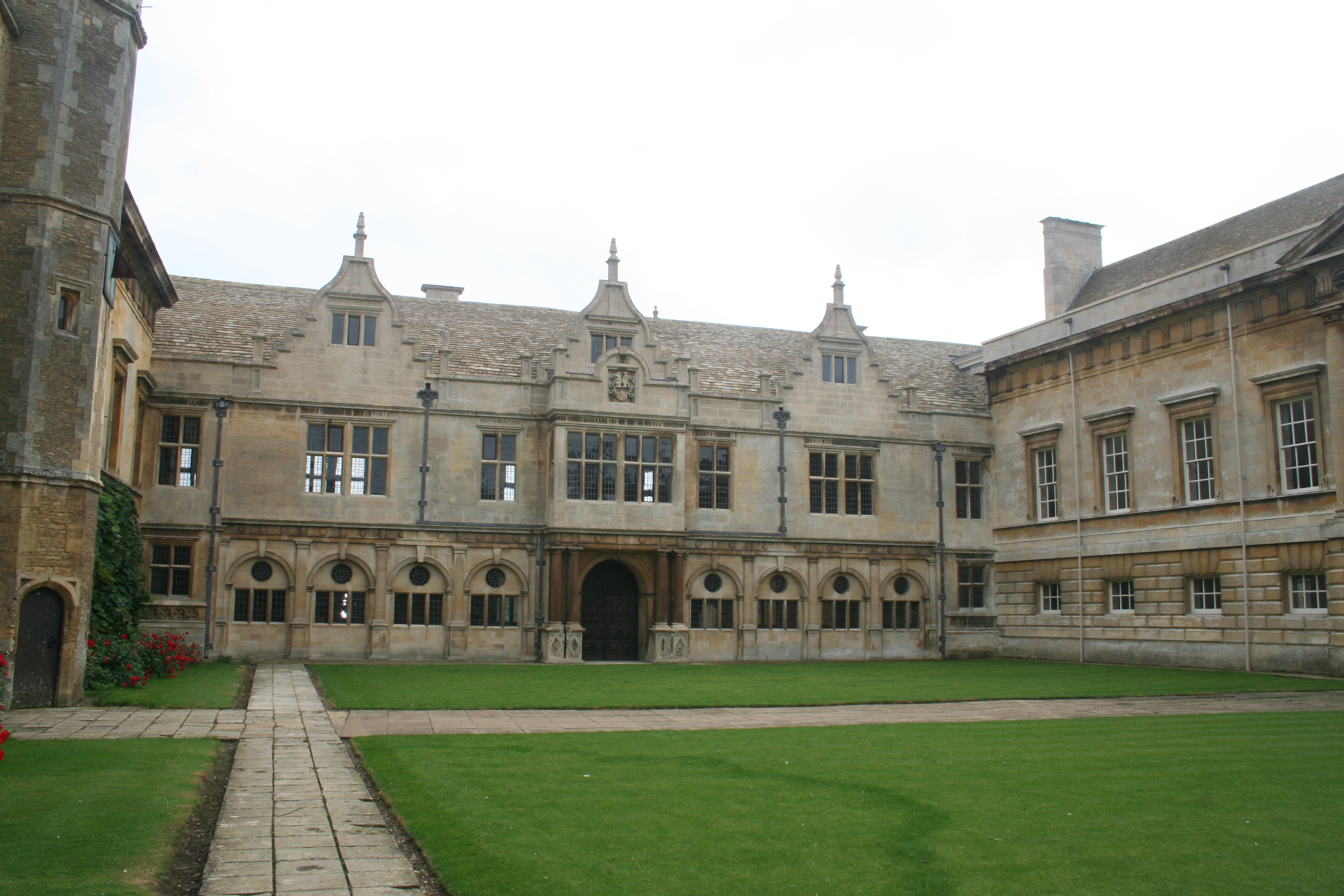
Apethorpe Palace – Eastern Courtyard

The house has been significantly altered and extended throughout its history. The first major alteration, the Jacobean royal extension, is attributed to Thomas Thorpe, brother of John Thorpe (at times himself attributed). The second, Neo-Palladian modifications which were planned to be more widespread, are attributed to Roger Morris. The third & final, largely Neo-Jacobean embellishments and internal reworking, was by Sir Reginald Blomfield. As a result of these, it is vast, with a floor area of approximately 51,000 square feet (4,700 m^{2}). This size, along with its three courtyards, led to Country Life saying it has "something of the character of a Cambridge college". For similar reasons, a later article stated that the entire palace "splits quite naturally into three contiguous houses: the Jacobean Hall, a central medieval hall house, and an Elizabethan hall house incorporating the 18th-century orangery."

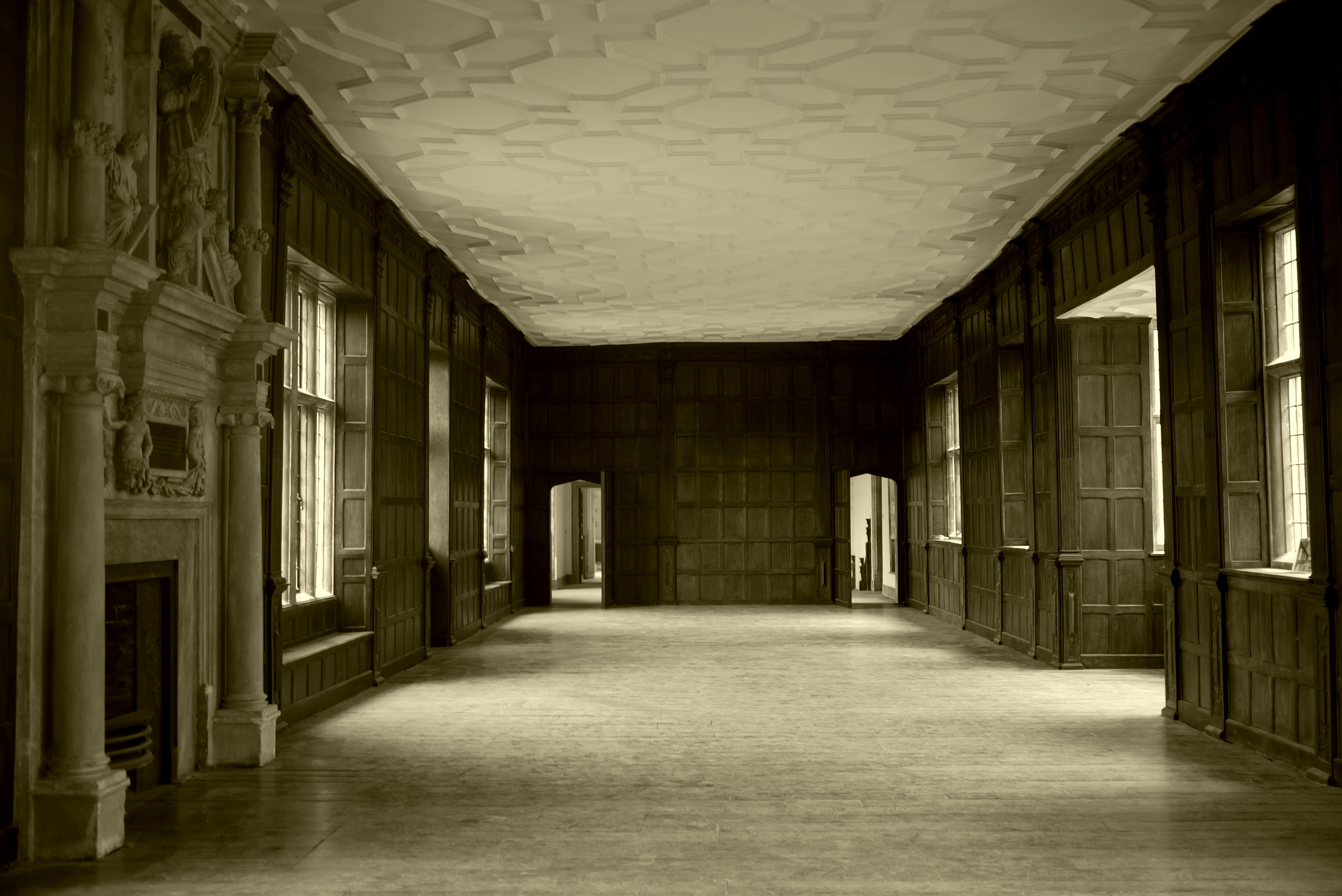
The interior of Apethorpe Palace

Apethorpe was large enough to accommodate both King James and his consort Anne of Denmark in August 1605. In 1622 King James financed an enlargement of the house and rebuilding of the south range with a new suite of state rooms on the first floor, and an open gallery around the perimeter of the house on the second floor. This suite of state rooms consisted of the Dining Chamber, the Drawing Chamber, the King Bedchamber, the Prince of Wales Bedchamber (with the three feathers carved on the fireplace) and the Long Gallery (last complete set of original Jacobean State apartments left in England). The entrance is still now surmounted by a statue of James I dating from that period. The King Bedchamber was embellished with a hunting scene over the fireplace and the royal arms decorated the ceiling. These State rooms contain a notable series of fireplaces incorporating in the carving iconographical statements such as the nature of kingship.

King James first met George Villiers, later Duke of Buckingham at Apethorpe in August 1614. During renovations in the 21st century, workers discovered a passageway linking James' apartment to that of his favourite, George Villiers. The discovery of the secret passage, according to Emma Dabiri, provides an "intriguing clue to the nature of the affair" between the King and Duke, who wrote each other love letters and were inseparable, she says. Historian Keith Coleman see the passage, dated to 1622-24, as evidence that physical intimacy between the pair may have lasted into the last years of James's life.

Its Lebanese cedar, planted in 1614 and considered to be the oldest surviving one in England, is a scheduled monument. Blomfield also worked on the formal gardens.

== Film location ==
The house has been used for filming scenes in Another Country and Porterhouse Blue. The restoration and attempts to sell the property were the subject of a fly on the wall documentary first shown on BBC Two in April 2009.
