= Apethorpe =

Village in Northamptonshire, England

Coordinates: 52.5497°N 0.4913°W

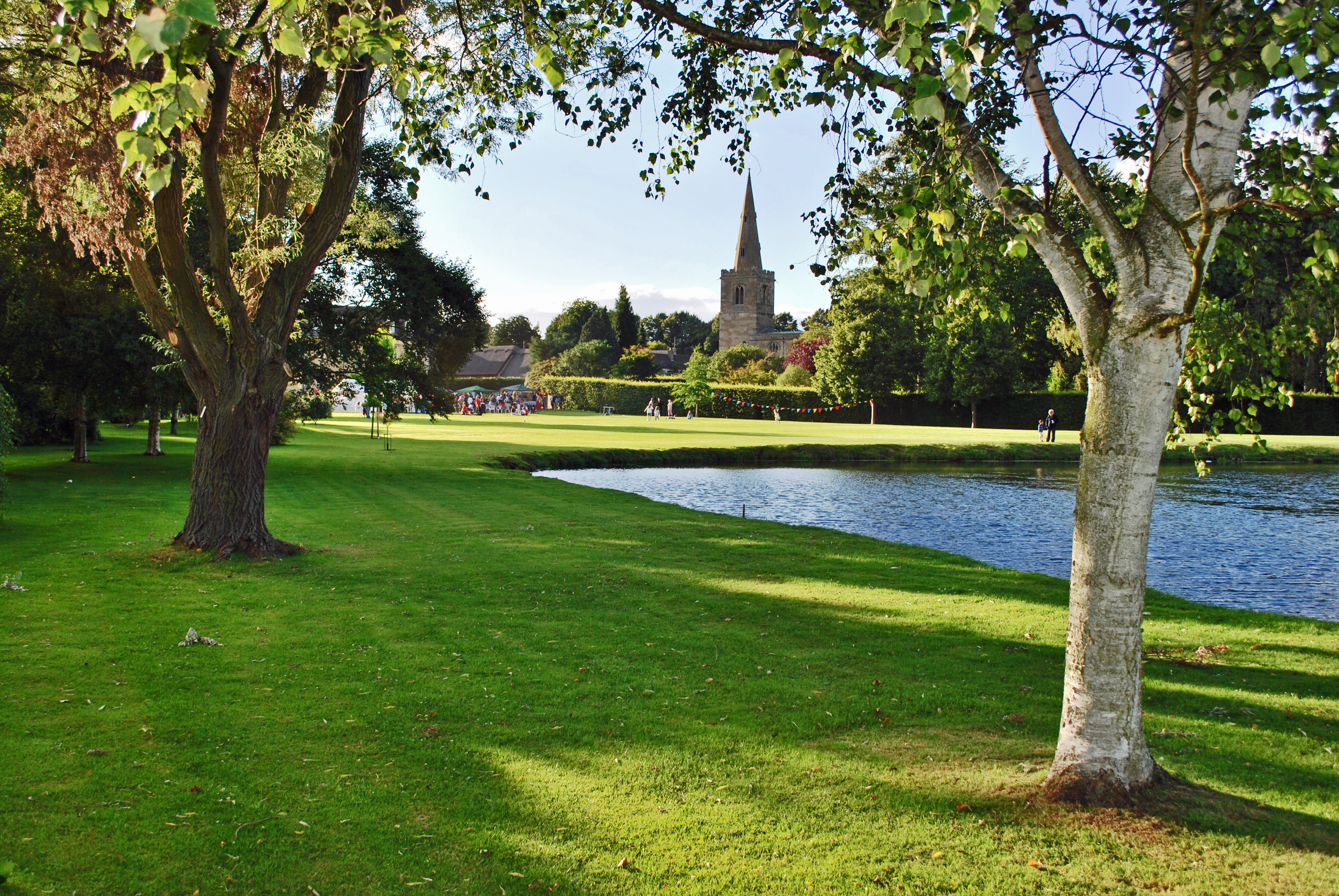
- Manor House gardens, Apethorpe

- Location within Northamptonshire
- Population: 160 (2011)
- OS grid reference: TL023957
  - London: 75 miles (120.7 km)
- Unitary authority: North Northamptonshire
- Ceremonial county: Northamptonshire
- Region: East Midlands
- Country: England
- Sovereign state: United Kingdom
- Post town: PETERBOROUGH
- Postcode district: PE8
- Dialling code: 01780
- Police: Northamptonshire
- Fire: Northamptonshire
- Ambulance: East Midlands
- UK Parliament: Corby and East Northamptonshire

Apethorpe (traditionally pronounced App-thorp, and still by many, although since the latter twentieth century increasingly Ape-thorp by others) is a village, civil parish, former manor and ecclesiastical parish in Northamptonshire, England (in the North Northamptonshire district), situated 11 miles west of the City of Peterborough. The 2001 census records a population of 130, increasing to 160 at the 2011 census. The manor of Apethorpe is recorded in the Domesday Book of 1086 as Patorp and has had various spellings over the past millennium, including Apetorp, Appetorp, Apthorp, Appethorpe and Apthorpe. The village's name means 'Api's outlying farm/settlement'. The village is compact, uniform and centred on Main Street. In the late 15th century the manor of Apethorpe was acquired by Sir Guy Wolston, an officer in the household of King Edward IV, who began the construction of the surviving Apethorpe Palace.

== Location ==
The village is approximately 6 miles (9.7 km) north of the Northamptonshire market town of Oundle, 12 miles (19.3 km) northeast of Corby, and 11 miles (17.7 km) west of Peterborough. The nearest railway stations are in Corby for London St Pancras and Peterborough for London King's Cross. London is about 75 miles (121 km) via the A1 road.

== Features ==
=== Church ===
St Leonard's Church, Apethorpe is mostly Perpendicular but has a chapel of 1621 and tower partly 1633. There is a huge monument to Sir Anthony Mildmay (d.11 September 1617) and another smaller one to Sir Richard Dalton (d.1442). Mildmay was the eldest son of Sir Walter Mildmay, an English statesman who served as Chancellor of the Exchequer of England under Queen Elizabeth I and also founded Emmanuel College, Cambridge. Sir Anthony inherited the family estate and was knighted in 1596 when he was appointed ambassador to Henry IV of France.

=== Apethorpe Palace ===
The Willow Brook bounds the eastern edge of the village, which contains the Grade I listed historical monument of Apethorpe Palace, former seat of the Earl of Westmorland. It has been owned by the Baron von Pfetten since 2014.

=== The pub ===
In 1904 Leonard Brassey made many alterations to the village, a number of cottages were built and the old Westmorland Arms was replaced by a new public house, The King's Head. The pub is owned by Baron Von Pfetten.

=== Other structures ===
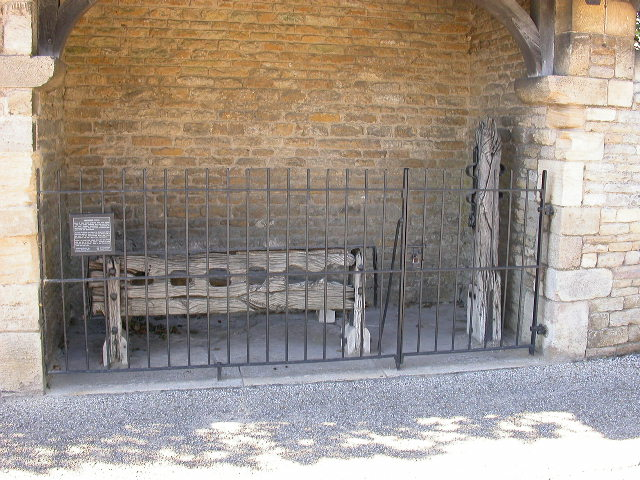
Stocks and Whipping Post

There is a stocks and whipping post just west of the church. The dovecote on the palace ground is 18th century listed as Scheduled Monument. Pevsner also mentioned Blue Field Farm 0.5 miles (1 km) northeast as having an interesting barn with a cross-cartway through it.

=== Roman villa ===
The remains of the villa lie about 500 yards (450m) southeast of the palace and were excavated in 1859. A courtyard of ca.230 by 240 feet contained the main buildings. The main block on the north side had hypocausts and fine geometric mosaics with two other wings and a bath block. Slate from Collyweston was used for the roofs. Pottery found included terra sigillata and Castor ware. Coins located the main period of use as the 4th century AD. There was a well in the centre of the courtyard. Two small un-inscribed house-altars were found. One coin of Septimius Severus, the remainder Constantinian (?), possibly indicating the date of the main phase of the villa. In successive phases of building there appears to have been at least one aisled building in the same position relative to a winged corridor house at Ickleton. The villa combines a dwelling house with an aisled house.

== Notable former residents ==
The village was home to the actor Rowan Atkinson.
