= Jean Christophe Iseux von Pfetten =

French diplomat and academic

Jean Christophe Iseux, Baron von Pfetten zu St. Mariakirchen (Chinese: 易思; pinyin: Yì Sī, born 11 November 1967 in Lyon), is a diplomat, academic and landowner.

Pfetten was the first European appointed as member of the Chinese People's Political Consultative Conference at local level.

Pfetten hosted a series of private meetings on Iran's nuclear programme attended by top military commanders from Iran and Israel as well as senior officials from the P5 nations.

== Early life and education ==
Pfetten received his BSc and MSc (Physics and Chemistry) from the University of Strasbourg, and, his Dipl. Eng. Geophysicist from the Institut de Physique du Globe (admissible to the Ecole Normale Supérieure) and thereafter won a European Erasmus scholarship. In 1989 he patented two inventions in the fields of nuclear submarine and of hydraulic fracturing which he presented at the SPE (Society of Petroleum Engineers) Production Operations Symposium on April 7–9, 1991 in Oklahoma, USA. In the same year he received a master's degree in management studies from Templeton College, Oxford University and a Master of Philosophy in international relations from Trinity Hall, Cambridge University. In 1992 he attained a master's degree in political science from the University of Bonn.

== Diplomacy ==
Pfetten was Chargé de Mission at the French embassy in Bonn, Germany, from 1991 to 1992. Aged 28 he became the youngest ambassador to the United Nations in Geneva as Permanent Representative to the World Trade Organization and the United Nations Conference on Disarmament between 1996 and 1997.

Pfetten hosted a breakthrough three days meeting at his French chateau in 2011 bringing a ministerial delegation from the Vatican together with senior Chinese officials for the first time since WWII which kickstarted diplomatic negotiations leading to the 2019 MOU signature between the two nations, the Financial Times reported.

On 11 July 2018 Pfetten was invited to give evidence on foreign policy in a shifting world order to the UK House of Lords Select Committee on International Relations.

== Academic career ==
Pfetten is currently the chairman of the Institute for East West Strategic Studies and is a visiting professor at People's University of China (since 2006). He is also a bye-fellow of Emmanuel College, Cambridge University (since November 2015). Previously Pfetten was a research associate at the Oxford Centre for Management Studies, Oxford University, from 1992 to 1994 and served as vice-president of the think-tank Oxford Analytica from 1994 to 1996. He then worked as a visiting scholar, teaching leadership management at the International MBA program of Tsinghua University from 1999 to 2000 and became Professor of International Political Economics at the School of Economics of Renmin University starting in September 2000 for a six-year tenure. At the same time, he was Director of China Studies at the Regulatory Policy Institute, which used to be called the Regulatory Policy Research Center affiliated with Hertford College, Oxford University, from 1998 to 2005. He was also a member of the advisory board of the Ecole des Hautes Etudes Commerciales in Paris, Honorary Professor at the Assumption University of Thailand, Member of the Beijing Academy of Social Sciences, Research Fellow of the China National School of Administration, and, China Advisor to the Asian Strategic and Leadership Institute.

== China ==
Pfetten was a specially invited member of the People's Political Consultative Conference (CPPCC) as representative for Changchun 2001–2005 and member of the Foreign Affairs Committee of CPPCC Shanghai 2009–2012. He was Special Advisor on Foreign Economic and Trade Cooperation to the Central Government (CEEC) from 2005 to 2009. He was investment advisor to 34 local governments in China including Beijing, Shanghai, Tianjin, Chongqing, Nanjing, Qingdao, and Shenzhen. He was also an adviser to the Investment Research Institute of the National Development and Reform Commission, the MOFCOM Transnational Institute, the All-China Chamber of Commerce, the Society of Environmental Sciences of the Ministry of Environmental Protection and the Chinese National Economic Research Institute.

Until recently Pfetten was China Advisor to the US Coalition of Service Industries and Honorary Representative of the Vancouver Board of Trade.

Pfetten currently holds non-executive positions on the boards of several multinationals. Pfetten has been credited with attracting around 2% of total foreign direct investment into China since 2002.

== Iran nuclear meetings ==
The Financial Times, Newsweek and The Spectator reported that between June and October 2013 Pfetten organized two rounds of back-channel diplomatic meetings on the issue of Iran's nuclear program. The first round, hosted by the Institute for East West Strategic Studies and held at Green Templeton College, Oxford, brought together senior Chinese and Israeli officials. A second, more confidential round of talks, hosted by Pfetten in his French chateau, was moderated by former Australian Prime Minister Bob Hawke and French Defence Minister Michele Alliot-Marie. Attendees included Major General Huang Baifu, vice chairman of the China Institute for International Strategic Studies; a former chief of general staff of the Iranian Air Force; as well as General Doron Avital, chairman of the Israeli Knesset's Security and Defense Committee. Pfetten told The Financial Times that the "Track II" meeting was "aimed at persuading Beijing to take a more pro-active involvement in the Middle East" and emphasized 'the willingness of China and the US to work hand-in-hand in resolving the Iranian nuclear issue.'

== Hound breeding ==
Pfetten was a joint master of the New Forest Foxhounds in Hampshire after Oxford and Junior master of the Equipage de Vens et Venaille for ten seasons from 1990 to 2000. Since 2000 he is Senior Master and Amateur Huntsman of the Equipage de Selore (Baron von Pfetten's Hunt) his family's ancestral private pack of hounds based at the Château de Selore in St. Yan, Saône-et-Loire, France. One of Pfetten's English foxhounds, Colonel, was named "Meilleur de Race" (Best of Breed) at the French National Hound Show (Fontainebleau June 2011). He was made a Champion at the World Dog Show (Paris July 2011) and became Champion of Champions at Bruxelles final show in October 2011, the first ever foxhound to win the title. Pfetten was elected president of the International Foxhound Association in 2012.

Pfetten has been a member of the UK-based Master of Foxhound Association (MFHA) since 1992, and his French pack of fox-hounds has been an overseas member of the British Hound Sport Association (BHSA) since 2022.

== Apethorpe Palace ==
In December 2014, English Heritage announced that it had sold Apethorpe Palace, a Jacobean stately home near Oundle in Northamptonshire, to Baron Pfetten. The house was a favorite of King James VI and I in the 1600s. It had this century fallen into disrepair, and so was acquired and then substantially renovated, at considerable expense, by English Heritage.

Simon Thurley, English Heritage's chief executive, welcomed the purchase, saying, "Since 2000 English Heritage has consistently said that the best solution for Apethorpe is for it to be taken on by a single owner, who wants to continue to restore the house and to live in it; especially one who has experience of restoring historic buildings and is prepared to share its joys with a wide public, as Baron Pfetten will do. Apethorpe is certainly on a par with Hatfield and Knole and is by far the most important country house to have been threatened with major loss through decay since the 1950s." As part of the purchase agreement, Baron Pfetten agreed to an 80-year commitment to open the house to the public for at least 50 days per year, a more extensive undertaking than usual.

The house continues to undergo major renovation works, funded since 2014 by Baron Pfetten. Pfetten has been a member of the Historic Houses Association since 2015.
