= List of works by Karl Parsons =

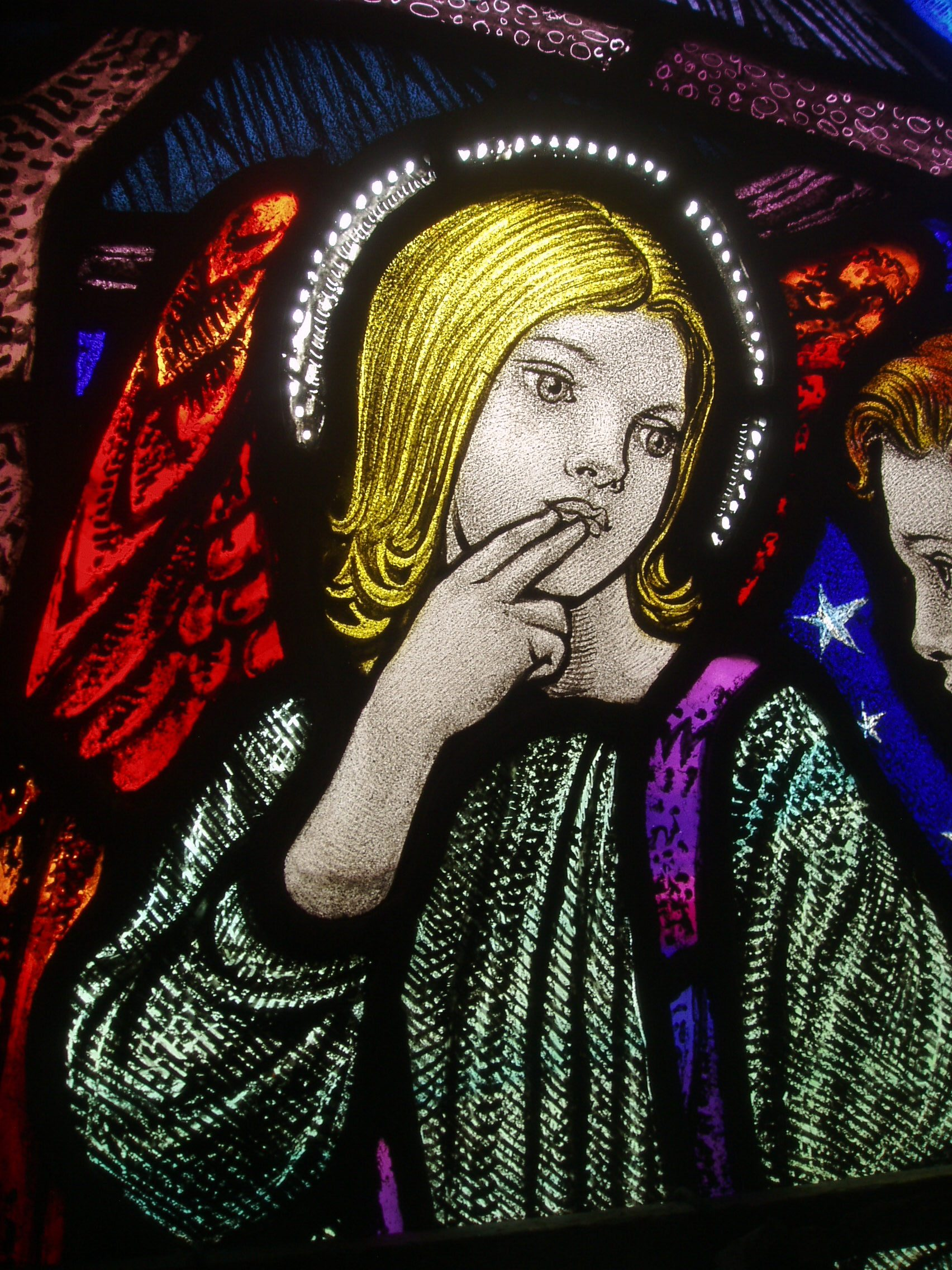
Detail from Ansley window

This is a partial list of works by English stained glass artist, Karl Parsons (1884–1934), for churches and cathedrals.

In writing about his craft Parsons wrote that to be worthy of it the stained glass artist had to have "a vocation for his job. He must be an artist who loves glass, the look and the feel and the mystery of it. But, above all, he must be an artist with knowledge of, and respect for, the traditions of his craft". Parsons described stained glass as "the most perfect art form known".

== Works ==
The partial list of Parson's works is sorted by date.

Image	Location	Date(s)	Subject, notes and references
	St Alban's Church; Hindhead, Surrey	1908 to 1910	In what was his first independent commission, Parsons completed five windows for this church. In 1908 he executed a two-light window depicting "Christ the Healer". In 1909, he completed the East window, a four-light window depicting the Annunciation, the Nativity, the Crucifixion and "Noli me Tangere". In the same year he completed a two-light window on the theme "Feed my Sheep". The left hand light is inscribed "Feed my sheep" and the right hand light "In the midst of the throne". Again in 1909 he made a two-light window which features a mother and child in the left hand light with the inscription "Thou shalt call his name Jesus" and in the right hand light we see Jesus with some children and this bears the inscription "He blessed them". Finally in 1910 he executed the window with the theme "Holy Communion" or "Celebrating Mass". Saint Bertha, Queen of Kent, William of Wykeham and the Bishop of Winchester all kneel whilst two children receive communion. See image in gallery shown courtesy Barkingtips.
	St George’s Cathedral, Cape Town, South Africa	1908–1909	The five apse windows were commissioned from Whall and Parsons in 1908 but only four were completed by 1909 and the fifth was entirely Parsons’ work. This fifth window depicts the Adoration of the Magi in the lower part of the two lights and the Visit of the Queen of Sheba to Solomon in the upper part. Parsons was to make another window for this Cathedral that being a single light in St David’s Chapel in 1918/9 and was later commissioned to design a window for the north transept. The work on this window had to be carried out by Edward Woore after Parsons’ death. Apart from his work in the Cathedrals of Cape Town and Johannesburg, Parsons also completed windows for a church in Potchefstroom, South Africa and another in Salisbury, Zimbabwe
	All Saints Church; St Andrews, Fife	1910	Parsons was responsible for the large window in the north transept entitled "This honour have all his saints". In Parsons' window there is an emphasis on Scottish saints in particular, and the central light contains a representation of St Andrew's Cathedral. In the larger figures the following saints are represented: Lower row, left, Saints Medana, Andrew, and Kennocha; right, Saints Ninian, Margaret and Patrick. Upper row, left, Saints Maura, Bridget, and Kentigerm; right, Saints Mund, Wilfred, and Columba. St George can be found among the smaller figures grouped above.
	St Mary the Virgin; Norwood Green Southall London	1911	The church‘s East window is by Parsons. The window is of three-lights and depicts "St George", "The Risen Christ" and "St Michael.".
	Old Saint Paul’s Church; Edinburgh, Lothian	1912	Parsons made three windows for the Lady Chapel. They depict "The Presentation in the Temple", "The Annunciation" and "The Nativity".
	All Saints Church; Eastchurch, Kent	1912	The window by Parsons in All Saints’, Eastchurch on the Isle of Sheppey, is in memory of Charles Stewart Rolls and Cecil Stanley Grace, the first British aviators to lose their lives in aircraft accidents. The window was consecrated in 1912 by Randall Davidson, Archbishop of Canterbury. John Newman in the Pevsner series Buildings of England wrote that the window was "heavily indebted to the style of Burne Jones." Charles Stewart Rolls (1877–1910) was a motoring and aviation pioneer. Together with Frederick Henry Royce he co-founded the Rolls-Royce car manufacturing firm. He was the first Briton to be killed in a flying accident, when the tail of his Wright Flyer broke off during a flying display near Bournemouth, England. He was aged 32. Cecil Stanley Grace (1880–1910) was a pioneer aviator who went missing on a flight across the English Channel later in 1910. The window was commissioned by the Royal Aero Club and Eastchurch was chosen as both men had done much of their early flying on the Isle of Sheppey. The window is of two lights entitled "Fortitude" and "Hope".
St Columba	St Michael's church Sulhamstead, Berkshire	1911	This church became redundant in the 1960s but Parsons’ two windows, both single lights, which had been in that church, were given to The Stained Glass Museum in Ely, where they are on display. One was entitled "St Columba" and the second "Christ the Good Shepherd".
	St Barnabas; Beckenham, Kent	1913 and 1918	The 1913 window is of two lights and depicts "Elizabeth" and "Zacharias". It is in memory of Richard Porter. That of 1918 is again of two lights and depicts "Our Lady" and "St Joseph". This window is in memory of K and E.Hancock.
	St Matthew's; Hastings, New Zealand	1914 to 1930	Parsons completed four windows for this church. The first, a window of five-lights, dates to 1914/1915 and it situated above the altar of the Lady Chapel. It depicts the Adoration of the Shepherds and the Magi as the central theme with various Minstrel Angels in the surrounding lights. It was donated by Lady Hariette Russell in memory of her husband Major-General Sir William Russell and six of their sons. A further three windows were installed in the Lady Chapel on the north wall. Two of these date to 1926 and were donated by Harold Russell in memory of his mother Lady Hariette. The third window was donated by the family of Margaret Candy and installed in 1930.
	St Giles’ Cathedral; Edinburgh, Lothian	1915	Four-light window commissioned for the Cathedral depicts St Columba, St Andrew, St Margaret and St Mund (Mungo) and is a memorial to Lord Archibald Campbell. Image in gallery below shown courtesy Keith Gale.
	St Matthew's church Oxhey, Hertfordshire	1916	This Grade II listed church dates from 1880 and was built in the Gothic Revival Style. Parsons’ window is in the Lady Chapel and is a three-light window depicting the "Nativity". The window was given to the church by Parsons and his brothers and sisters as a memorial to their parents. The window was partly damaged after the Second World War and repaired and repainted by Edward Woore. There is also a stone plaque in the Lady Chapel inscribed "In loving memory of Karl Parsons Jan 23 1884 – Sep 30 1934."
	St Mary; Whitekirk, East Lothian	1916	Parsons completed a window for this Robert Lorimer restored church.
	St Chad; Ladybarn, Lancashire	1916	Parsons completed a memorial window for this Manchester church remembering Norman Sawers Scott and his brother Ian Sawyers Scott, both killed in the Great War. Norman Sawers Scott was a second lieutenant in the 2nd Battalion of the King’s Own Scottish Borderers and was killed at Ypres on 23 April 1915. He was 20 years of age. His brother Ian Sawers Scott was also a second lieutenant in the 2nd Battalion King’s Own Scottish Borderers and was killed at the Battle of the Somme on 1 July 1916. He was 19 years of age. The window also remembers William Sawers Scott MD who died 31 January 1923 aged 62 years. On this window Parsons put his "parr and suns" emblem, not something he did often (a parr is a young salmon). The window is on the South wall of the Nave. It is a two-light window and between the lights is a Scottish officer’s sword mounted onto a stone mullion. Below the window there is an inscribed stone tablet. Each window depicts a knight in armour. The knight on the left holds a St George flag and the knight on the right holds a St George shield. The face of each knight is a likeness of the two brothers remembered
	Church of St Mary the Virgin; Tenby, Pembrokeshire	1909 and 1917	The 1909 window is of three-lights. The lights left and right are of plain glass and in the centre light a standing figure of Mary holds lilies. The 1917 window is of four-lights. At the centre of the window the standing, crowned, figure of Christ blesses a soldier in armour, presented by an angel who crowns the soldier. The "new" Jerusalem is shown in the background. Below an angel greets the three women who visit the empty tomb. In the left-hand light a robed female figure holds a shield and broken sword with fire rising behind and castellated walls, with Christ on the cross above in a mandoria. The right-hand female figure stands with her arm chained, the flowers of a tree around her and the Virgin and Child above in a mandoria. Further angels appear in the tracery and rays of light emanate from the uppermost light. Parsons also completed an opus sectile plaque for the church in 1919.
	St Laurence; East Harptree, Somerset	1919	A War Memorial three-light window with St George in the centre light, St Laurence in that to the left and St Agnes on the right. St Agnes holds a lamb. Image shown in gallery below shown courtesy Keith Gale.
	St James the Less; Pangbourne, Berkshire	1919	Four-light East window depicts St George, two scenes from the Nativity and St Michael. See image in gallery below. Window given by Sir George and Lady Armstrong as a memorial to their son, George Carlyon Armstrong and nephew Philip Armstrong, and all the men of the parish who gave their lives in the Great War. There is a plaque in the church which reads " IN PRAISE AND THANKSGIVING TO GOD AND TO THE GLORIOUS MEMORY OF/ GEORGE CARLYON ARMSTRONG 2ND LIEUTENANT 1ST BATTALION COLDSTREAM GUARDS/ WHO FELL IN ACTION AT GUINCHY ON JAN 25 1915 AGED 18 YEARS AND OF ALL THOSE IN THIS PARISH WHO/ GAVE THEIR LIVES FOR KING AND COUNTRY IN THE GREAT WAR 1914 – 1919/ THIS EAST WINDOW IS THE WORK OF KARL PARSON AND WAS ERECTED BY SIR GEORGE AND LADY/ ARMSTRONG IN MEMORY OF THEIR SON GEORGE CARLYON ARMSTRONG, THEIR NEPHEW PHILIP/ ARMSTRONG AND MEN OF THIS PARISH WHO GAVE THEIR LIVES FOR THEIR COUNTRY. ALTHOUGH A WAR/ MEMORIAL, THE THEME OF THE WINDOW IS PEACE."
	St Peter and St Paul; West Newton, Norfolk	1920	Parsons designed a memorial window depicting St George and remembering those men of the Norfolk regiment who died at Suvla Bay in 1915. The inscription reads "THE NORFOLK REGIMENT/ SUVLA/ TO THE GLORY OF GOD AND IN PROUD AND LOVING MEMORY/ OF CAPTAIN FRANK BECK M.V.O.AND HIS MEN/ +THEY GAVE THEIR LIVES FOR KING AND COUNTRY/ ON AUGUST THE TWELFTH NINETEEN HUNDRED AND FIFTEEN". The three-light window has a Norfolk Regiment cap badge in the left hand light and in the centre light Parsons depicts St George with shield which depicts Christ standing above a fallen dragon. An image of Suvla Bay is in the right hand light.
	Holy Innocents’ Mount Peel, New Zealand	1920	A two-light window was made for this church, the commission coming through Lowdnes and Drury. One light depicted "Faith and Charity" and the second "The Christ Child". Window dedicated 6 May 1920 and in memory of Mary D.Lysaght, who died January 1916. Parsons received a second commission from this church in 1929, this for a two-light window depicting "The Adoration of the Shepherds".
Hammer and Tongs	Stained Glass Museum; Ely, Cambridgeshire	c. 1920	Also in the Stained Glass Museum is an oval glass panel entitled "Hammer and Tongs". Two medieval characters are shown attacking each other. One pulls his opponent’s hair with a pair of tongs whilst the other hits his knee-cap with a hammer. Parsons used it to illustrate the poem he had written- "O hark to the hautboys, give ear to the gongs,/That sound for the Tourney of Hammer and Tongs-/ The clang-tankerous sight to which everyone throngs..."
	All Saints; West Winterslow, Wiltshire	1920?	A two light window of the Nativity. “Numbered with Thy Saints” “Grant them, O Lord, eternal rest & let light perpetual shine on them” “To the revered memory of Major Robert Poore 1834 – 1918 and of his wife Juliana Benita Corry 1845 – 1920 who devoted their lives to the greater wellbeing of their countrymen. Their reward also is with the Lord.”
	St Philip; Leicester, Leicestershire	1921	A three-light window depicting "Christ in Majesty".
	Christ Church; Fulham, Greater London	1922	Parsons executed three windows for this church, all as War Memorials. A single-light window depicts" St Michael the Archangel", and another the "St Michael, the Angel of Peace". There is also a three-light window depicting Christ with St George and St Alban.
	Christ Church; Yankalilla, South Australia	1922	Parsons completed a lancet window for this church. Features an Angel within a vesica inscribed "Praise to the Holiest in the Heights and in the Depths be Praise" (from Newman’s "Dream of Gerontius").
	St Swithun's; Hempsted, Gloucestershire	1924	"Of Such is the Kingdom of Heaven" "In treasured memory of little Margaret Tew 1916" who died from typhoid at the age of 12.
	St Martin of Tours; Epsom, Surrey	1926	Five-light window celebrates the "Benedicite", the window commemorates a member of the Grellier family.
	St Mary; Alsager, Cheshire	1926	The Goss memorial window in the South Aisle features St Michael and St Gabriel in an outstanding design by Parsons, which was executed in glass by the London company of James Powell and Sons.
	St Nicholas; West Lexham, Norfolk		Parsons window in the North Aisle has St George in the centre light and honours the memory and bravery of Captain Frank Reginald Beck and the Norfolk Regiment. Frank Beck (3 May 1861 – 12 August 1915) was a Land Agent on the King's Sandringham Estate. He was instrumental in the formation of the Sandringham Company of Volunteers in 1906 which included grooms, gardeners and household staff from the Estate. On 12 August 1915 Beck led his company on an attack at Suvla Bay in the Dardanelles when he and most of his comrades were killed.
	Christ Church; Pukehou, New Zealand		In the north of the church is a Parsons designed window.
	All Saints’ Porthcawl, Bridgend	1927 to 1928	A five-light East window. "Christ in Majesty" flanked by angels with the heavenly city depicted above in the tracery. Below a seraph stands over the Virgin and child who is being adored by the shepherds and the Magi. At the sides, Peter and Isaiah, opposite Moses and John.
	St Andrew; Ilford, Essex	1927 to 1931	The architect here was Sir Herbert Baker and Parsons secured commissions for eight windows. Included are "St Andrew", "St Peter", "Remembrance" and "St John the Baptist".
	St Mary's; Bibury, Gloucestershire	1927	Parsons’ window in the North Chancel wall featured in the 1992 Christmas stamp set issued by the Royal Mail. The window carries the inscription "To the Glory of God and in memory of Rowland.B.Cooper died Oct 16 1910, aged 64 and of Ellen his wife who died Feb 27, 1926, aged 77." Photograph shown in the gallery below shown courtesy Barkingtigs.
	St Mary’s Cathedral; Johannesburg, South Africa	1927 to 1929	Five-light Apse window for the Cathedral depicts "The Annunciation", "The Visitation", "Virgin and Child in Majesty", "The Nativity" and "The Presentation at the Temple." The architect of the Cathedral was Francis Leonard Hodgson Fleming (1875–1950). Fleming had first met Parsons when Fleming worked in the office of Herbert Baker. He was an assistant there and later a partner, Fleming became a good friend of Parsons and gave him several South African commissions. He also completed a single-light window for the Epiphany Chapel in the Cathedral, this depicting Christ with the Sacraments. In the panels above and below the main figure, Parsons has depicted Christ and the Apostles on the road to Emmaus and the Nativity.
	St Michael and All Angels; Waterford, Hertfordshire	1929	A single light window depicts St Cecilia. Commissioned by Mrs. Prentice to commemorate her daughter, Rachel, who died at age nineteen in March 1919, depicts the angel, bending over to whisper in the ear of Saint Cecilia (patron saint of music). The lower panel is inscribed with a quote from Revelations (14.4): The first fruits unto God.
	Church of St James; Pyle, Bridgend	1929	Parsons’ two-light window shows the Good Samaritan coming to the aid of an injured man.
	St Peter; Bardon Hill, Leicestershire	1930	Parsons was responsible for the design of the East window, which is in memory of John Breedon and his wife Harriet Selby Everard. In a letter to the church dated 11 July 1929 Parsons wrote "I wanted simplicity and fresh, bright but soft colour." In the centre of the window is the Madonna and Child, with the Archangels Michael and Gabriel on either side.
	St Laurence; Ansley, Warwickshire	1930	Parsons was responsible for the West window in this church. The window depicts a seated Christ in Glory flanked by angels, whilst below a seraphim, bearing a star, is flanked by St Laurence and St Agnes. The bottom row shows the Virgin and Child with children being presented by young angels on either side. The window is dedicated to the memory of W.G. Phillips, great grandfather of Captain Mark Phillips (father of two of the Queen's grandchildren). Photograph shown courtesy Aidan McRae Thomson.
	St Bride's Church; Kelvinside, Glasgow		In the Lady Chapel of this Glasgow church is a window by Parsons which depicts the "Nativity". In describing this window, Parsons wrote that he "wanted to convey a sense of 'deep hush'." In the centre, the sleeping Jesus is watched by his kneeling mother. Four scenes from the Nativity stories in the Gospels of Matthew and Luke complete the window. From Matthew there is the dream of Joseph (bottom left) and the escape to Egypt (top right). From Luke there is the visit of Mary to Elizabeth (top left). Then you see the meeting in the Temple when Simeon recognises Jesus as the Messiah (bottom right). Image shown in gallery courtesy Keith Gale.
	St Mary; Potchefstroom, South Africa	1930	Lancet windows depict St Michael and St Gabriel. Parsons made a third window depicting the Virgin Mary.
	Christ Church, Catshill, Worcestershire	1931	A St Christopher themed window in the East Chapel in memory of Christopher Morcom. It has the inscription "Thou wilt show me the path of life". In their volume "Worcestershire" in the Buildings of England series, Alan Brooks and Nikolaus Pevsner described the window as "fine Arts and Crafts work".
	St Augustin; Bournemouth, Dorset	1931	West window of two-lights presented in memory of Hector MacKenzie Forbes who had served as a churchwarden from 1914 to 1921. One light depicts the "Annunciation" and the second the "Adoration of the Magi". The tracery light in the latter was painted by Margaret Parsons, Karl’s daughter. As Parsons’ health deteriorated, Margaret often assisted her father to complete commissions.
	St Peter; Brakpan, South Africa	1931 and 1933	Parsons made a window depicting "The Good Shepherd" in 1931 and in 1933 a window depicting "St Peter".
	Buwalasi College Chapel; Buwalasi, Uganda	1933–34	Five-light window designed by Parsons in collaboration with Edward Woore when Parsons’ health had forced him to leave Shalbourne and move to Putney. The window was commissioned by Arthur Kitching, first Bishop of the Upper Nile. The design incorporates the arms of Ridley Hall in Cambridge. Kitching had been a student there.
	St John the Baptist; Rudmore, Portsmouth	Unknown	Parsons window in what was the Lady Chapel. The former church of in Simpson Road has been converted into sheltered flats.
St Luke	St Michael and All Angels; Shalbourne	1995	Two lights depicting the Virgin Mary and St Luke are in memory of "Anthony Firebrace 1917–1976, beloved husband of Rosamond Firebrace of this parish". They were designed by Parsons, formerly resident in Shalbourne, and made by Henry Haig ARCA in 1995.

== Gallery ==
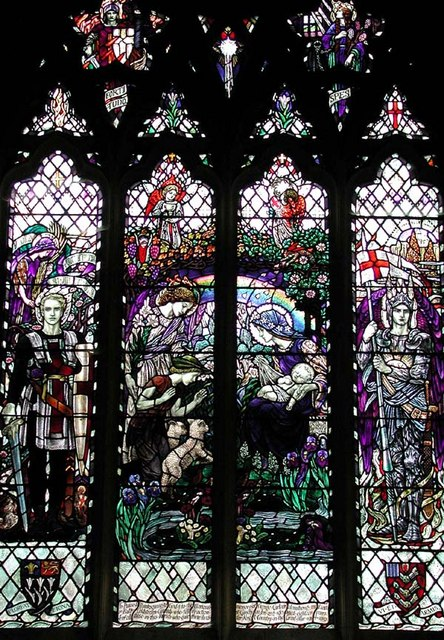
Window in St James the Less, Pangbourne.

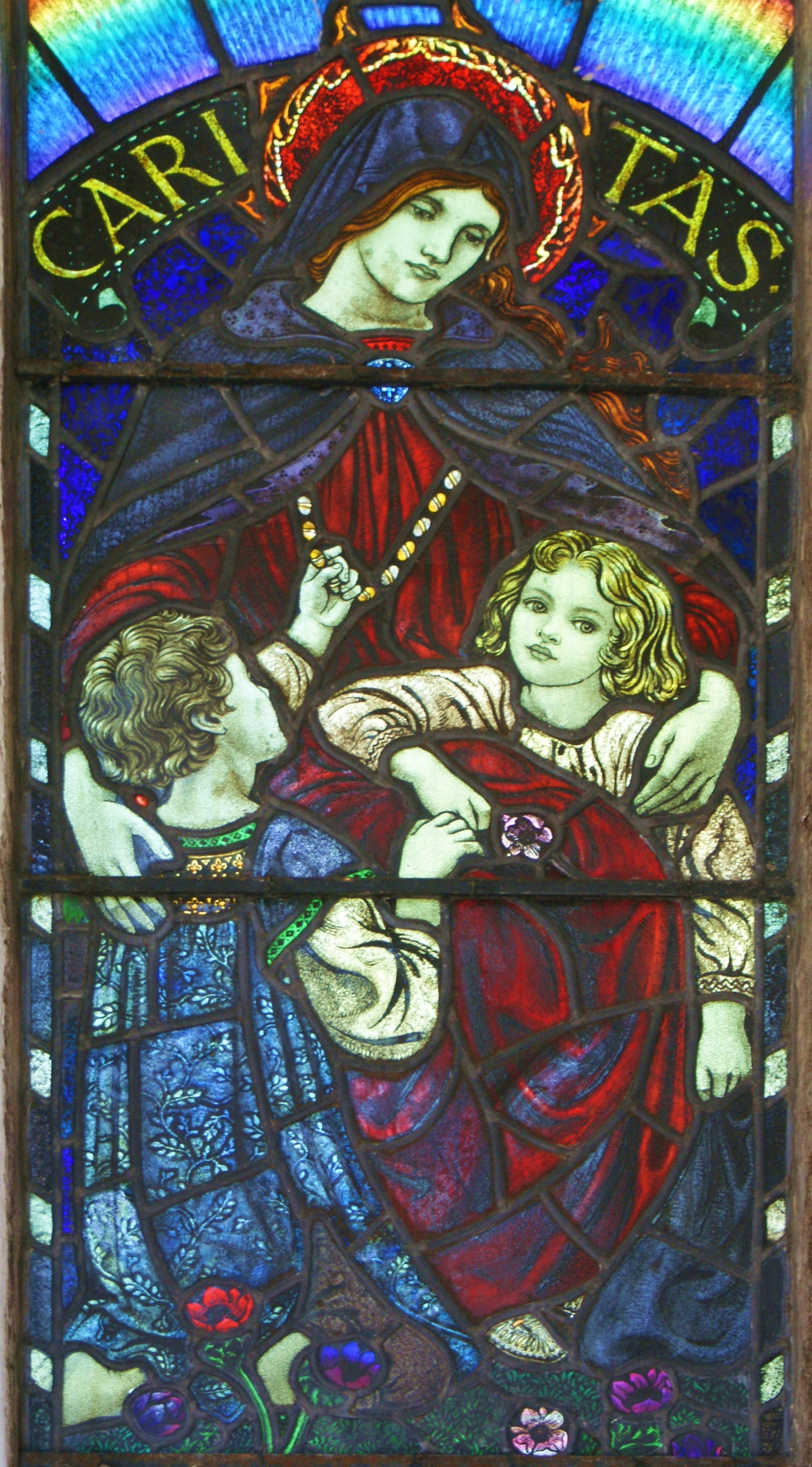
Window in St Mary Bibury

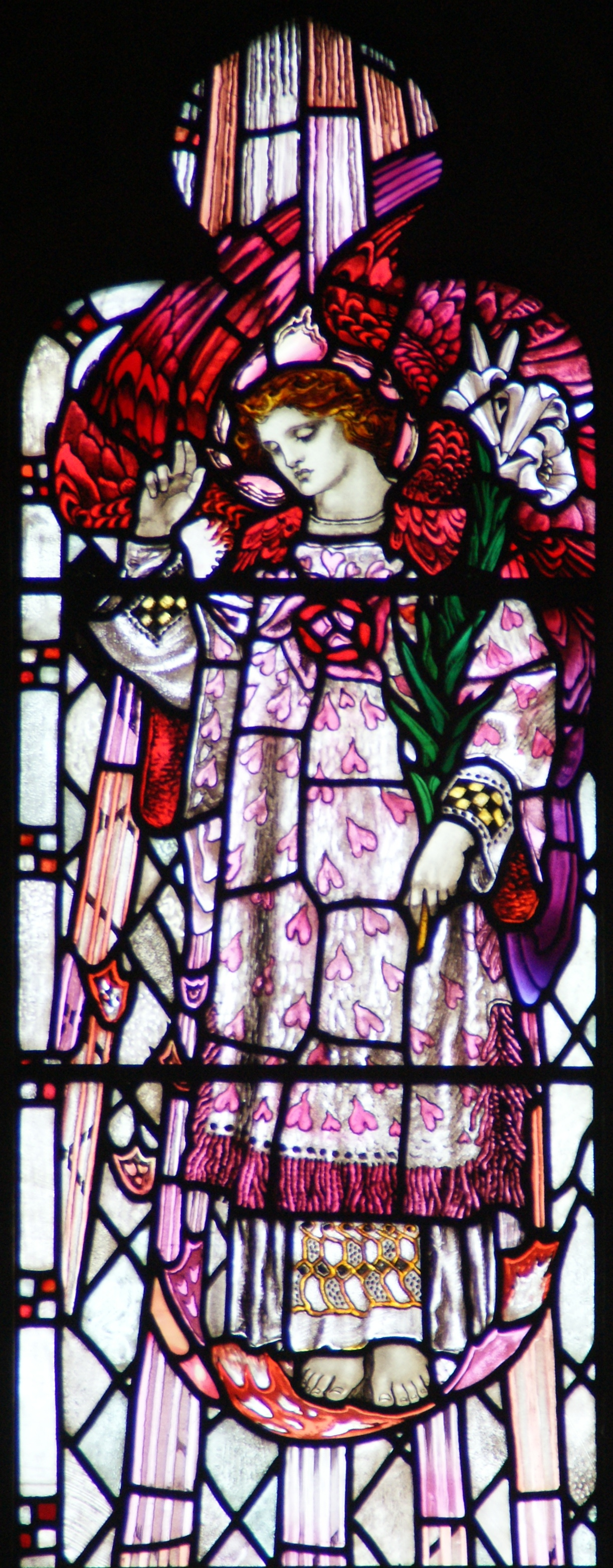
Window in St Albans, Hindhead

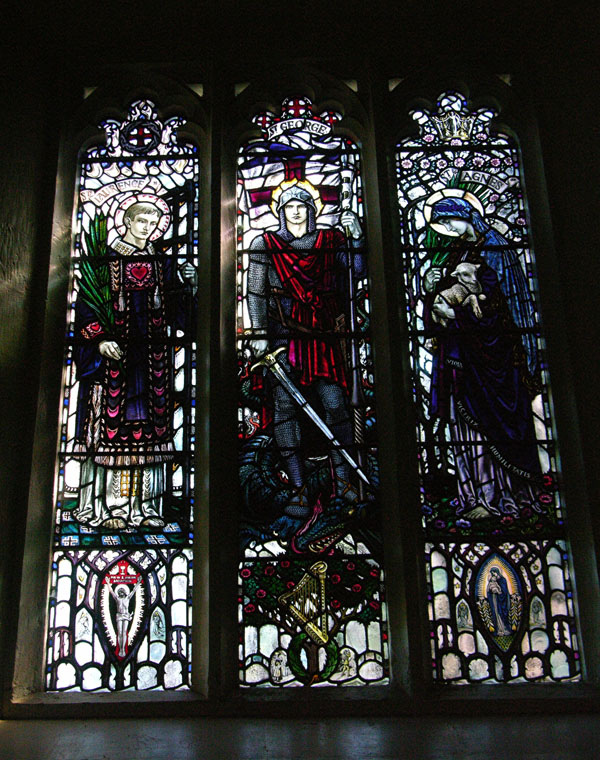
Window in St Laurence, East Harptree

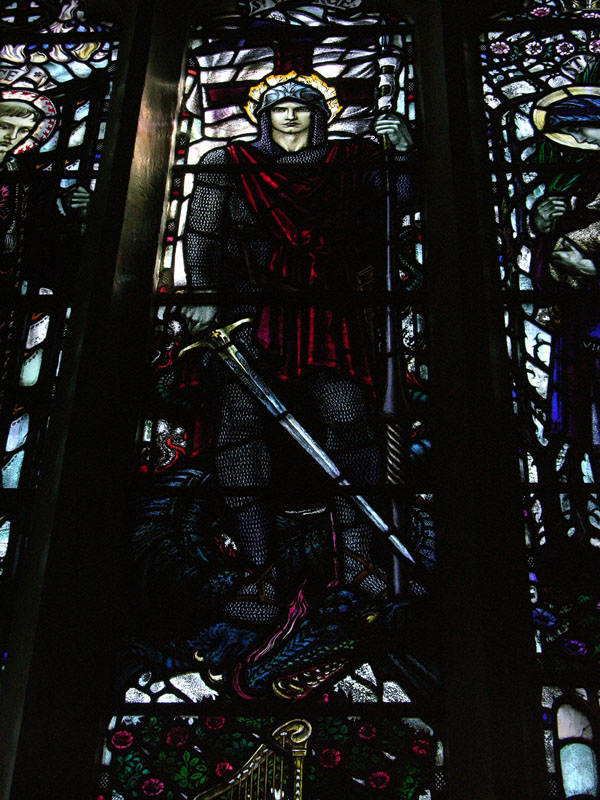
Detail from St Laurence, East Harptree window

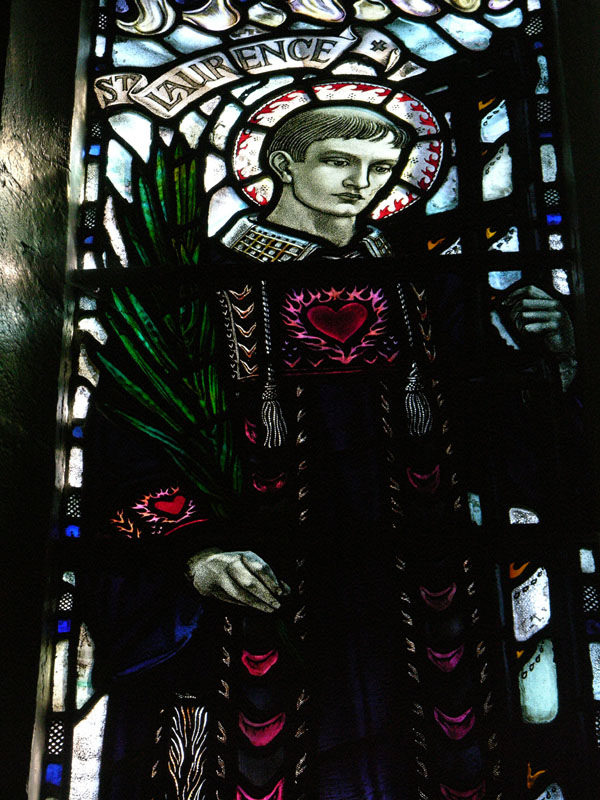
Detail from St Laurence, East Harptree window

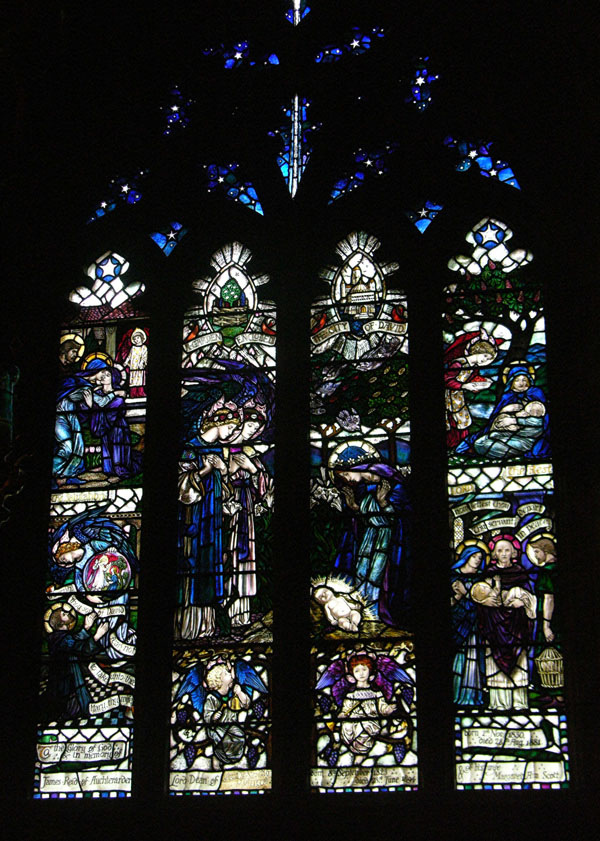
View of St Bride's Kelvinside window

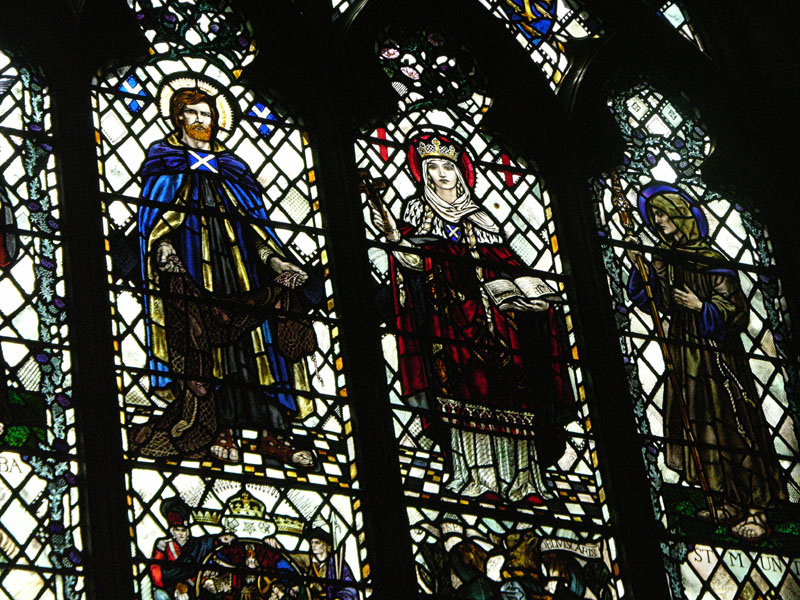
View St Giles, Edinburgh window

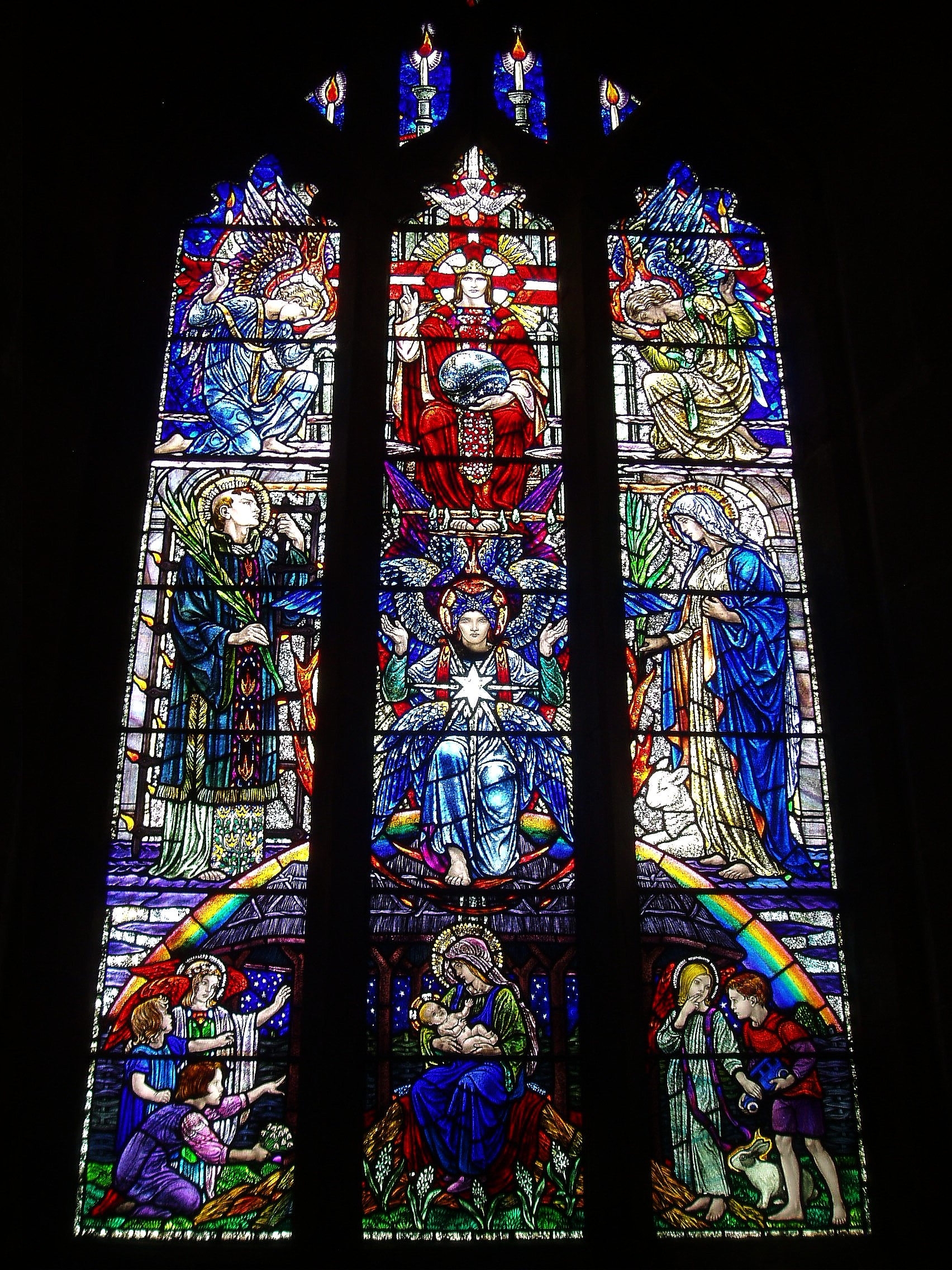
Three-light window at Ansley.

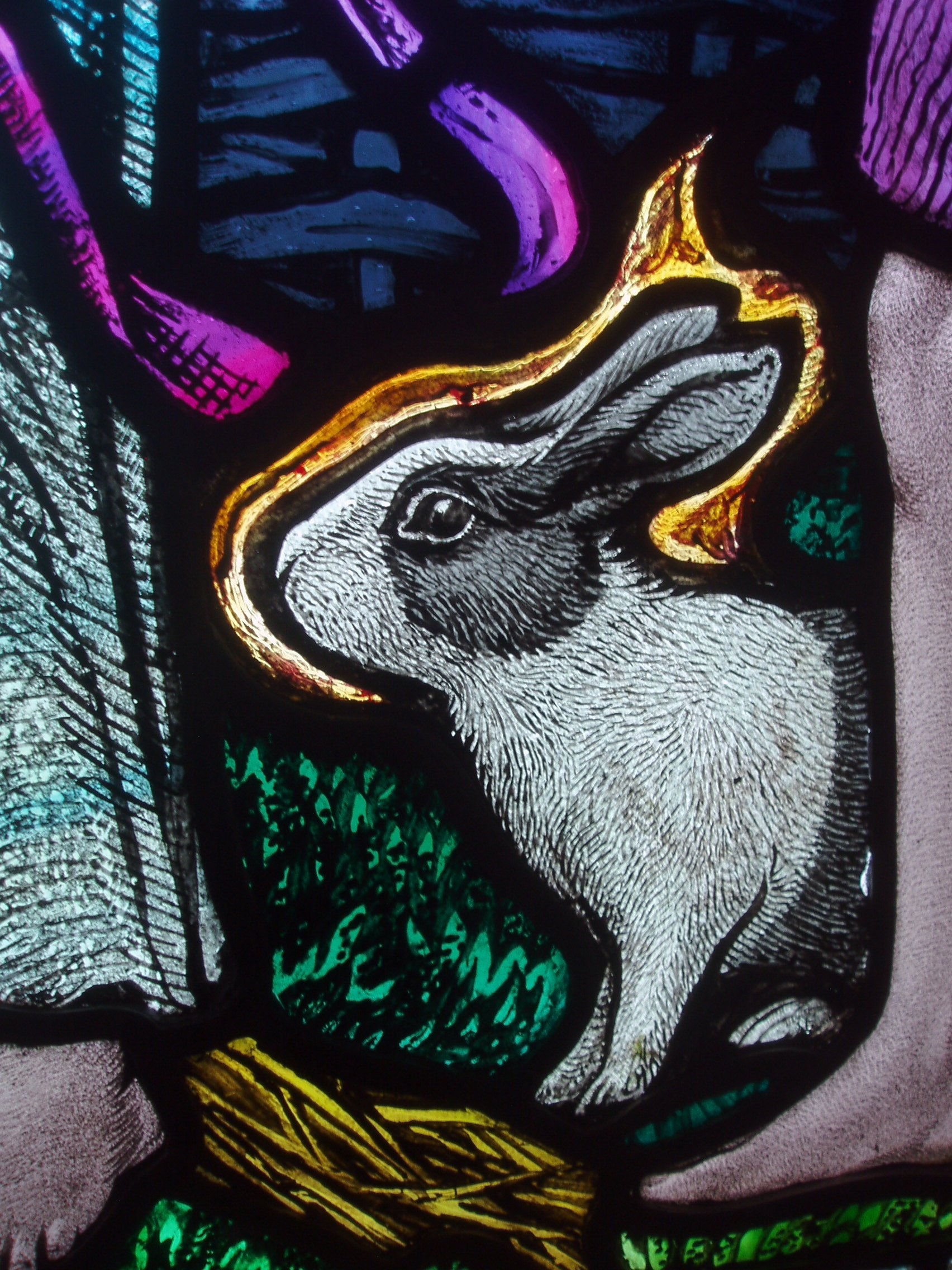
Another detail from Ansley Three-light window

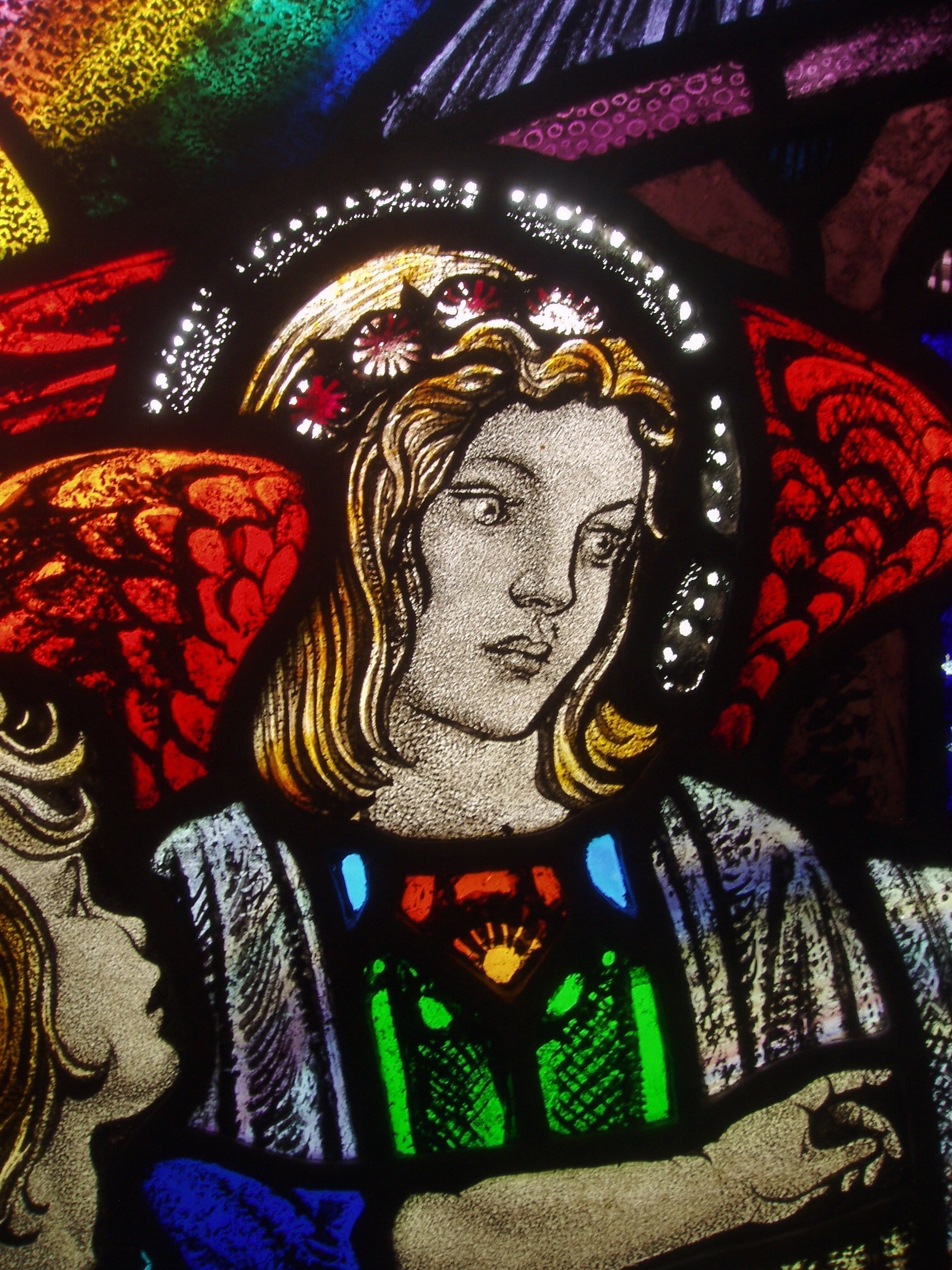
Three-light window

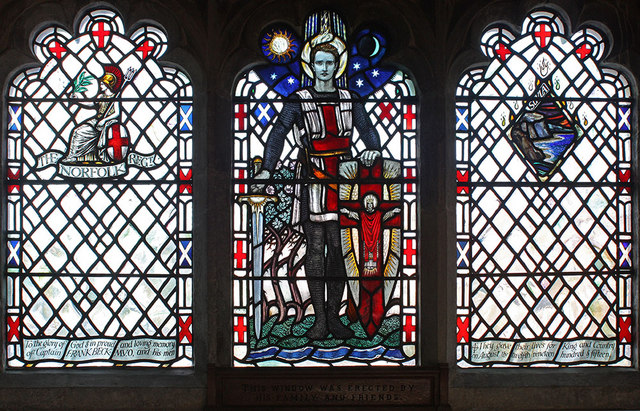
Memorial window for Frank Beck, West Newton

== See also ==
- Christopher Whall
  - List of works by Christopher Whall
  - Christopher Whall in Gloucester Cathedral

Other followers of Christopher Whall

- The works of Veronica Whall
- Works of Arnold Wathen Robinson
- List of works by Margaret Chilton
- List of works by Marjorie Kemp
- Works of Caroline Townshend
