= Dunsire =

Dunsire is a surname. Notable people with the surname include:

- Deborah Dunsire (born 1963), South African pharmaceutical executive
- Robert Dunsire (1891–1916), Scottish recipient of the Victoria Cross
