= Marjorie Kemp =

Scottish stained-glass artist

Marjorie Boyce Kemp
- Born: 1886; Blairgowrie, Scotland
- Died: 20 April 1975 (aged 88–89); Edinburgh, Scotland
- Known for: Stained glass
- Movement: Arts and Crafts movement

Marjorie Boyce Kemp (1886 – 20 April 1975) was a Scottish stained-glass artist who studied under Margaret Chilton in Glasgow, and eventually set up a studio in Edinburgh with her. This is a list of her major works excluding collaborations with Margaret Chilton, which are listed under List of works by Margaret Chilton. After Chilton's death, Kemp retired from stained-glass work and died in Edinburgh on the 20 April 1975.

== Works in parish churches ==
Church	Location	Date(s)	Subject, notes and references
All Saints' Church	Dunedin, New Zealand	1932	A single light window in twelve sections, with three scenes on the theme of Matthew 25:40 "And the King shall answer and say unto them, Verily I say unto you, Inasmuch as ye have done it unto one of the least of these my brethren, ye have done it unto me." In three scenes the window shows a woman offering Christ food, water and shelter. The window contains three parts of the Matthew 25:40 text:"Inasmuch.. the least of these...my brethren" Above the inscription there is an image of Miss Howlison's parish church in England. The inscription reads: To the Glory of God & in grateful memory of Isabella Howlison, entered into rest October 5, 1919 AD.
Longformacus Parish Church	Longformacus, Borders	1943	Kemp's window in this church features St Francis.
Kirk of St Nicholas	Aberdeen		Kemp's ”Crucifixion” and “Resurrection scenes” form part of the great central window of the Apse in this church which contains much Arts and Crafts stained glass.
Alyth Parish Church	Alyth, Perthshire	1948	Kemp designed the West window under the South gallery in this church. It is entitled “The Sower”, described by author John Gifford as “an example of restrained expressionism”. The window commemorates the Revd James Meikle who was minister at this church from 1897 to 1933. It depicts the Parable of the Sower and features the local raspberry crops.
St Cuthbert's Church	Milburn, Cumbria		Kemp executed a two-light window for this church depicting St George and the dragon in the left light and St Luke in the right side light.
Crieff Parish Church	Crieff	1950	For this church Kemp executed a window entitled “Scenes from the Life of Our Lord and St John the Baptist”.
St Kenneth's Parish Church	Kennoway, Fife	1950	Kemp executed six windows for this church in the East and West aisle. They depict “New Testament Scenes”.
St Andrew and St Leonard-Martyrs Church	St Andrews, Fife	1947	The War Memorial and Women's Guild Window was designed and executed by Kemp and was dedicated on Remembrance Sunday, 9 November 1947. The window is in memory of the members of the congregation who fell during two world wars. It is a three-light window and the centre light depicts St Leonard and an inscription from Psalm 124. The left hand light shows Dorcas and the right panel shows Eunice reading a book. The left hand light was in fact designed by W. Wilson.
Buckhaven Parish Church	Buckhaven, Fife		An East window by Kemp depicts “The Crucifixion”.
Moncur Memorial Church	Stronsay, Orkney Islands	1955	Kemp executed the east window “The Good Shepherd”. Described by John Gifford in “The Buildings of Scotland: Highlands and Islands” as “expressionist, with strong blue the dominant colour”.
