= List of works by Veronica Whall =

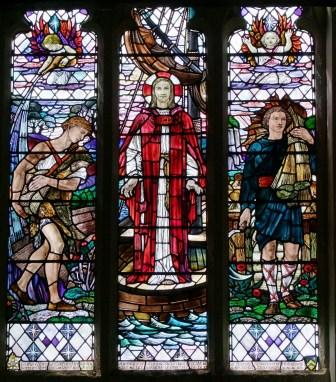
Whall window in Ewhurst Church

The works of Veronica Whall provides a list of works carried out by Veronica Whall (1887–1967).

Whall predominantly created stained glass works for churches and cathedrals. She started out assisting her father, Christopher Whall, in stained glass commissions, such as that at All Saints in Valescure, France, in 1918-19 and the St Christopher window in Sproughton, Suffolk, in 1924.

Aside from being a stained glass artist and designer, Whall also worked in watercolour. One such work was "The elf hour" which was exhibited at The New Gallery's Summer Exhibition of 1907. In 1912 Whall wrote and illustrated "The Story of Peterkin in the Wood". Whall also illustrated a book that was a selection of folk-songs, under the title "Ships, Sea-Songs and Shanties" written by a relative, Captain William Boultbee Whall. Captain Whall was a mariner and writer on nautical subjects. The selection was published in 1910 by James Brown & Son in Glasgow.

== Stained glass works ==
For more on this important stained glass artist and the history of the art in this period, see Peter Cormack, Arts & Crafts Stained Glass (London & New Haven: Yale University Press, 2015).

The following is a list of some of Whall's stained glass work. She also designed windows for St Wilfred's Church in Brighton, and performed restoration work following the war for the Roman Catholic Church of St Mary in Clapham.

Building	Location	Date(s)	Subject, notes and references
St Michael & All Angels' Church	Bude, Cornwall		There is a Whall window in the Parish Church of St. Michael and All Angels in Bude Haven which was built between 1834 and 1835 and consecrated in 1835 and was the gift of Sir Thomas Dyke Acland. Built of stone from Trerice-in-Newlyn, it stands on the southern side of the harbour. It was built originally as a chapel of ease for the nearby Stratton Church but later became the Parish Church of Bude Haven. Standing on a hill above the historic Bude Canal, the church is visible across the beautiful beaches and Downs of Bude. Whall completed a window for this church.
St Martin's Cathedral	Leicester, Leicestershire		Two windows were completed for the cathedral's St Dunstan's Chapel.
St Mary's Church	Lynton, Devon	1907	Whall completed a lancet in the North Chapel of St Mary's entitled "St Anne and the Virgin". In The Buildings of England: Devon by Bridget Cherry and Nikolaus Pevsner, this work was described as "a fine composition of blue, purple and greens." Whall also completed a window in the West of the church
St Peter's Church	Swinton, Greater Manchester	1932	A Whall three-light window in St Peter's dating to 1932 depicts the Saints Francis, Hilda and Columba. This church also has a window dating to 1912 which was a joint collaboration between Veronica, her father and Edward Woore. This church is a fine building of stone with a lofty Western Tower and was built to designs by G.E. Street in 1869. Interesting to note that the lych-gate, between the churchyard and the street, was added as a War Memorial after World War I, and features carvings by John Cassidy. It was unveiled in 1922, and is now a Grade II listed structure. The names of Swinton's war dead are inscribed inside the arch.
St Bede's Chapel	Greenwich, Connecticut	1915	The chapel, on the campus of Rosemary Hall (an independent girls school), was designed by Theodore T Blake and described in the New York Times in 1909 as the "only example of pure Middle English Gothic architecture in America". Veronica assisted her father Christopher in designing the 16-foot stained window at the North end of the Chapel which was installed in 1915. The window honours the Venerable Bede, the patron Saint of Education. The window comprises six main lights and fifteen pieces of tracery. From left to right the lights depict St Bede, St Anne, St Benedict, St Catherine of Siena, St Gregory and St Francis of Assisi. The figures occupy the upper, two sections with their names inscribed above and in the lower section under the saints name are vignettes of girls learning different subjects. These from left to right are Natural Sciences, Grammar, Discipline in the home, Arts, Music and Health and Play. In the centre of the tracery is a depiction of some angels, surrounded by quarry glazed tracery pieces . In the lower, large tracery sections are angels holding titles of desirable traits; Vision (Visus), Admiration (Admiratio), Speech (Oratio), Prayer (Preces), Hearing (Auditus), Praise (Laus), Thought (Mens) and Loving (Spes Amor). Veronica was responsible for designing all the angels in the tracery.
St Mary's Church	Cheadle, Cheshire	1921	Christopher Whall had already completed a major window for this church in 1917 and Veronica added a window on the south side of the chapel.
Methodist Church	Whalley, Lancashire	1921 and 1927	Whall executed two windows in the North and South of the church. The 1921 window features the Virgin and Child with a musician cherub and a chorus of birds as well as rabbits and mice. The 1927 commission features St Francis with birds as well as large figures with good lettering
St Mary's Church	Sarnesfield, Herefordshire	1922	The window in this church is attributed to Whall and Whall. 1922 was the year the company was established. It is a two-light window with St George in the left hand light and an Angel in the right hand light. The inscription reads "Be thou faithful unto death" (left hand light) and "and I will give thee a crown of life" (right hand light).
St John the Evangelist's Church	Keswick, Cumbria	1923	St John the Evangelist has a three-light window dedicated to John Marshall of Derwent Island (nephew of the church founder) who died on 23 December 1923. In The Buildings of England. Cumberland, Westmorland. Furness Matthew Hyde and Nikolaus Pevsner write "with tenderly drawn children" in their reference to this work. John Marshall was a grandson of Henry Cowper Marshall. John Marshall and his younger brothers helped to establish the National Trust.
St Catherine's Church	Irchester, Northamptonshire	1924	Three-light window in St Catherine's North Nave depicts the life and martyrdom of St Catherine.
Victoria and Albert Museum	South Kensington Inner London	1925	This museum has a window by Whall. It features a trumpeting angel and is inscribed with a quotation from St Matthew's Gospel "Usque ad consummationem seculi" – "I am with you even unto the end of time." These were Jesus Christ's words at His Ascension.
St Martin of Tours Church	Chelsfield, Kent	1925	Whall executed a window in the South Chancel of this church. The left hand light shows St Martin astride his horse and handing half of his cloak to a beggar and in the other light Martin kneels before Our Lord who is seen holding the piece of cloak.
St Mary's Church	Compton, Sussex	1926	Whall's window is the fourth light in the South Aisle window. It is entitled "Charity" and was a Whall and Whall commission.
Carlisle Cathedral	Carlisle, Cumbria	1926	Pevsner described Whall's work in St Catherine's Chapel as "a beautiful and poignant window to a young man killed at Arras in 1916." Arthur Penn and Edna Mallett in their booklet- 'Carlisle Cathedral: The Stained Glass and The Carved Capitals' (Smith, Much Wenlock, 1996) record that the window, featuring the Nativity and the Crucifixion was dedicated to the memory of 2nd Lieut. Anthony Harvey Bowman.
St Peter and St Paul's Church	Ewhurst, Surrey	1926	Whall's three-light window is known as the "Stevenson Memorial Window" and has "Christ in Majesty" in the centre and a Sower and Reaper to left and right. See image above. See also Maiden Bradley.
St Mary's Church	South Hylton, Durham		This church is located near Sunderland. Built in 1880 by C. Hodgson Fowler as the earlier church had been destroyed by fire in 1878. The church has stained glass by Veronica Whall, James Eadie Reid and Leonard Evetts. The church's windows had to be restored after the 1941 German bombing. Whall's window is of two-lights with the inscription "These are virgins they follow the lamb, withersoever he goeth." The church has links to many shipbuilding families and the Maling and Donnison families.
St Mary's Church	Berry Pomeroy, Devon	1926	Window completed in the North Aisle East is a three-light window. The left hand light is inscribed "The Lord redeemeth the soul of His servants" and in that on the right is written "and none of them that trusted Him shall be desolate."
All Saints' Church	Exmouth, Devon	1926	Three windows for All Saints were completed in the Lady Chapel and Baptistery.
All Saints's Church	Maiden Bradley, Wiltshire		A two-light window in memory of Algernon, Duke of Somerset (d.1923). The window was a gift to the church by his wife Susan Seymour and has depictions of the Sower and the Reaper. (See Ewhurst window which is very similar).
St Bartholomew's Church	Nymet Rowland, Devon	1927	Whall completed the "Partridge Memorial window" in the South part of the church. The window is in memory of Leonard Partridge and Eleanor Partridge who died in 1922 and 1926 respectively.
Holy Trinity Church	Wickwar, Gloucestershire	1927	A window was completed in the Tower West. In The Buildings of England: Gloucestershire 1:The Cotswolds by David Verey and Alan Brooks, the work was described as "entirely in her father's Arts and Crafts style."
St Anne's Church	Pleasant Valley, New Zealand		For this church Whall completed her first work in New Zealand. Called "Two Angels in a vine" it was in memory of Ethel H. Moffat. Ethel was Christopher Whall's sister.
Community of the Sacred Name	Canterbury, New Zealand		Whall executed a window for the chapel. It shows the foundress of the Community, Mother Edith Mellish, as St Brigid. In her book "Stained Glass Windows of Canterbury, New Zealand", published by Otago Press, Fiona Ciaran described the window thus "The colours of the glass used and the fine paintwork are extraordinary."
St Thomas's Church	Woodbury, New Zealand	1927	For this South Canterbury church, Whall designed the window entitled "An Angel with the Crown of Life". It remembers W. P. Turton who died in December 1926 and was donated by his wife. The church also has a window by Joseph Edward Nuttgens. Another Veronica Whall window is "Christ as the Supreme Angel with St Wendelin and St Elizabeth of Hungary." This dates to 1927 and is dedicated to Cotsford Matthews Burdon and was donated by his wife Mildred.
Christchurch Nurses' Memorial Chapel	Christchurch, New Zealand	1927 and 1928	The Christchurch Hospital Nurses' Memorial Chapel was built during 1927 and 1928 and is located on the Christchurch Hospital site, fronting Riccarton Avenue in Christchurch, New Zealand. Regarded as an architecturally significant building with a late Gothic Revival structure and an Arts and Crafts Movement-inspired interior that incorporates significant works of art, including stained glass windows by Whall. Whall's windows are "The Angel of Charity and a Waif" which commemorates Mary Ewart, "Faith and a Sick Child" which remembers Sybilla Maude OBE, "Christ and Children" a tribute to Annie Pattrick and "The Angel of Hope"
Gloucester Cathedral	Gloucester, Gloucestershire		Window in South Chantrey. A memorial to former Cathedral organist Sir A. H. Brewer (1897–1928). In 1928 Veronica designed the C. W. Whall Memorial window for the south transept. St Christopher is the central figure.
St James's Church	Bossington, Hampshire	1928 and 1930	Two windows were completed for this church. In 1928 a stained glass window was executed which featured a lighthouse. Another window was added in 1930.
St James's Church	Runcton Holme, Norfolk	1928	For St James she executed a two-light window in the South Nave which features "The Annunciation". Window depicts "Mary discovering the empty tomb"
St John the Evangelist's Church	Winchester, New Zealand	1930	The church has a Veronica Whall stained glass window "The Christ-child blessing in Majesty with emblems of Faith and Hope" in the East Sanctuary in commemoration of Joseph R. Orford, the founder and first headmaster of the church's school.
St Michael's Church	Amberley, West Sussex	1931	Whall's two-light window features St Edith with child in the right hand light and an angel in that on the left. Window is in memory of Edith Octavia Jennings of Amberley House who died in Florence on 4 June 1931. Church also has a splendid window of 1919 by Robert Anning Bell. St Michael's is a 12th-century church adjacent to Amberley Castle.
Church of St Mary	Denbigh, Denbighshire	1933	The foundation stone of the church was laid on 6 July 1871. The church has a two-light window by Whall in the South wall of the Nave. The left hand light shows the angel of God in full armour with a flaming sword, and angels above, as the Israelites cross the Red Sea. The left hand light shows John the Baptist baptising Christ in the river Jordan, with the Holy Spirit descending in the form of a dove. The inscription reads- "'And the angel of God, which went before the camp of Israel, removed and went behind them" (Exodus 14:19). "Behold the Lamb of God, which taketh away the sin of the world'"(John 1:29,36). The text above the angel in the left hand light reads- "'and the waters were divided" (Exodus 14:21). The dedication reads-"'To the glory of God and in memory of Anna Maria Story late of Coppy Denbigh who died 21 November 1918".
St John the Baptist	Westfield, Sussex	1933	Whall's rose window shows the Madonna and Child with two angels holding the inscription "et revelabitur gloria Domini et videbit omnis caro pariter quod os Domini locutum est" which is from Isaiah 40:5 "And the glory of the Lord shall be revealed, and all flesh shall see it together: for the mouth of the Lord hath spoken it."
St Mary's Church	Ashby Folville, Leicestershire	1934	Whall designed the North Aisle window which was commissioned by the Smith-Carington family in memory of their mother Elizabeth Prince Smith-Carington and their brother Neville Woodford Smith-Carington MP. The subject is the "Wedding Feast at Cana" and includes items of the Smith-Carington family interests, including Shire horses in the left-hand panel. The drawings of the wedding guests were apparently based on local people. They appear disgruntled at the lack of wine and Mary points to a wine jar with Jesus looking on. The harassed servant girl seems at her wits end while children at the front tuck into oranges and grapes. Outside horses and a ploughman toil in the green fields of Ashby. At the top of the window three small girls depicted as angels look down on proceedings. Information from church guide and supplied by Mrs. Rosemary Holt, a St Mary Churchwarden.{
St Cuthbert's Church	Aldingham, Cumbria	1934	Whall's window is entitled "Annunciation to the shepherds". In the volume The Buildings of England: Cumbria Matthew Hyde and Nikolaus Pevsner wrote "Delightful, if not as intensely coloured as her father's work". The two-light window shows an angel announcing the birth of Jesus to two men and two boys. The Angel is in the right hand light and the men and boys in the left hand light. One of the boys has a dog by his side. In the right hand light two lambs look up towards the angel
St Andrew's Church	Kilmeston, Hampshire	1936	St Andrew's is listed Grade 2 and was built in 1772 on the foundations of what the Domesday survey noted as "annexed to Cheriton". The church is in fact thought to be of Saxon or Norman origin. It was restored in 1865 and then again in 1875 and 1898. Whall's two-light window depicts "The Conversion of St Paul" in the left hand light and "St Peter in chains" in the right hand light. The window is dedicated to the memory of John Heathcote of Kilmeston Manor. The design for this window was exhibited at the Arts and Crafts Society Exhibition of 1941. At the top of the lancet showing St Paul's conversion is a striking representation of Christ on the Cross.
King Arthur's Hall	Tintagel, Cornwall	Between 1930 and 1933	King Arthur's Great Hall was built in the 1930s by a custard millionaire whose company is thought to have invented the confection "hundreds and thousands". The Halls of Chivalry are built from 53 different types of stone and are big enough to hold 1000 people. Whall designed 72 stained glass windows which tell the story of King Arthur and show the Coats of Arms and weapons of the knights involved.
Our Lady of Grace and St Teresa of Avila Church	Chingford, London	1939	Whall's windows in this church were described in The Buildings of England. London 5: East by Bridget Cherry, Charles O'Brien and Nikolaus Pevsner as "A fine, colourful east rose window and a subtle Lady Chapel north window by Veronica Whall in 1939, the latter with delicate figure of Virgin and Child, largely white against a band of blue, intricately leaded."
Holy Trinity Church	Blackburn, Lancashire	1948	Whall designed a window in the Baptistery of this church. This Gothic church, built between 1837 and 1846 by Edmund Sharpe, is now a redundant church managed by The Churches Conservation Trust.
Holy Ghost and St Stephen's Church	Ashchurch Grove, Hammersmith	1948	There is a Veronica Whall window in the Holy Ghost and St Stephen's North Chapel North.
St Mary's Church	Osterley, Middlesex	1948 and 1949	Whall was responsible for two of the stained glass windows in this church. That in the North Aisle is a three-light window called the "Harding" window and this depicts the Good Shepherd with angels. It commemorates Edward Arthur Harding who died in a flying accident in 1946. The second window of three-lights, situated along the South Aisle, serves as a war memorial for all those who fell in the Second World War. It was installed in 1949 and has 1939-1945 written in the lower panel. It depicts Jesus stilling the storm in the centre light, and on the left a blacksmith is seen beating swords into ploughshares. In the right hand light is a harvest scene. In the scroll on this window is a quotation from Isaiah 2.4 "and they shall beat their swords into ploughshares... neither shall they learn war any more".
All Saints's Church	Blaby, Leicestershire	1949	A two-light Veronica Whall window was given to this church by the British Legion. This was the last major commission before the closure of Whall and Whall in 1953. The window depicts David and Jonathan.
St Peter's Church	Highfields, Leicester	1949	A replacement to the west window (damaged beyond repair during the second World War), this window is on the Marian theme and depicts mothers and children of different races gathering around the young Jesus. many have considered the window prophetic.
St Mary's Church	Stamford Brook	1930	Whall executed a three-light window in the South Aisle of this church but the church no longer operates having been converted into flats in 1986.

== Gallery ==
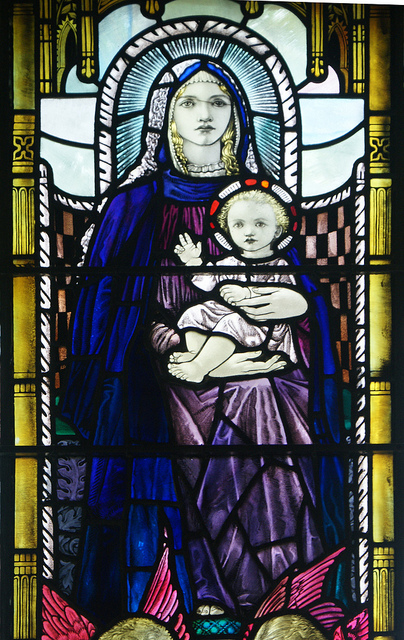
Whall window in Westfield

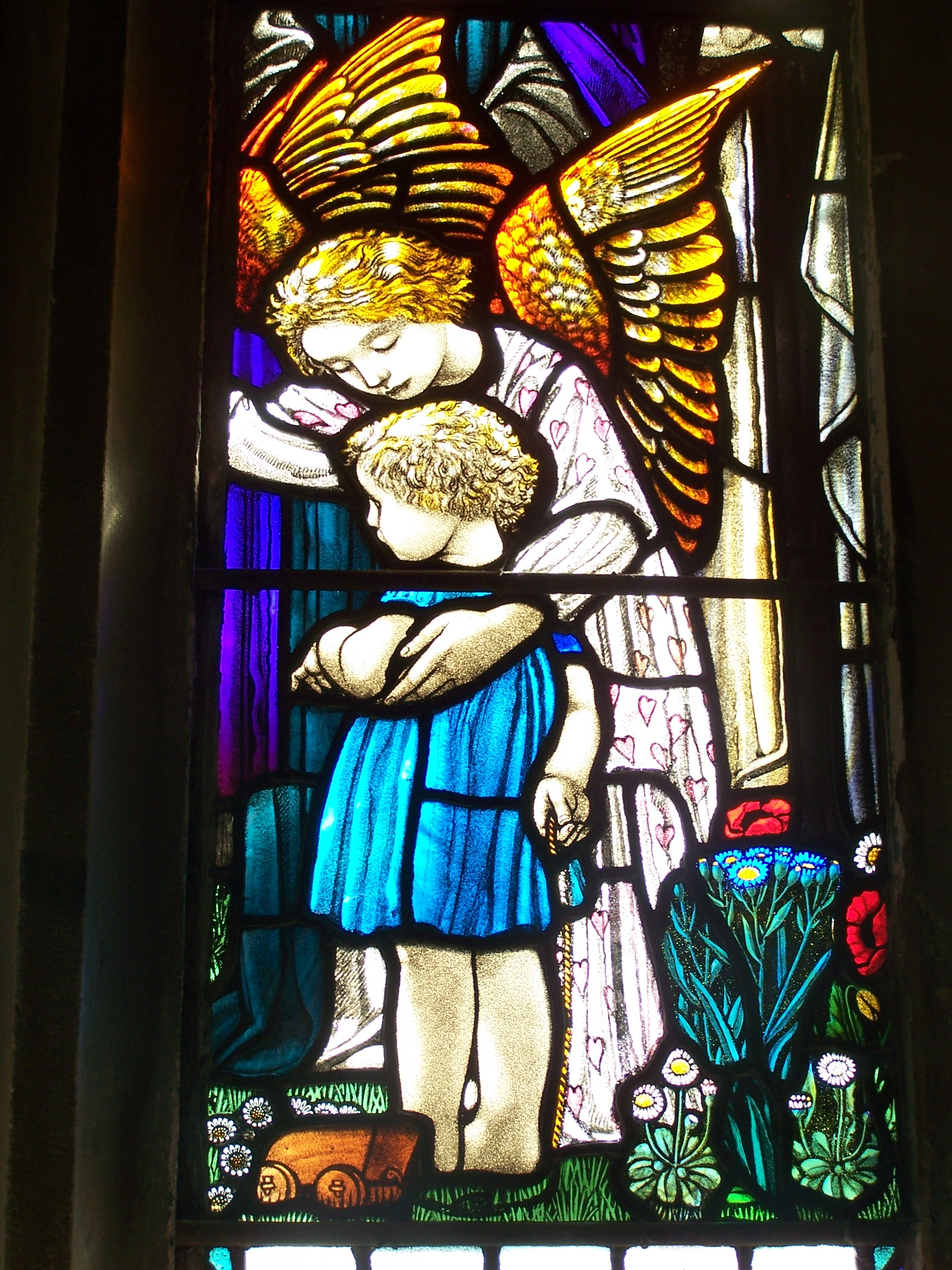
Whall window in St John, Keswick

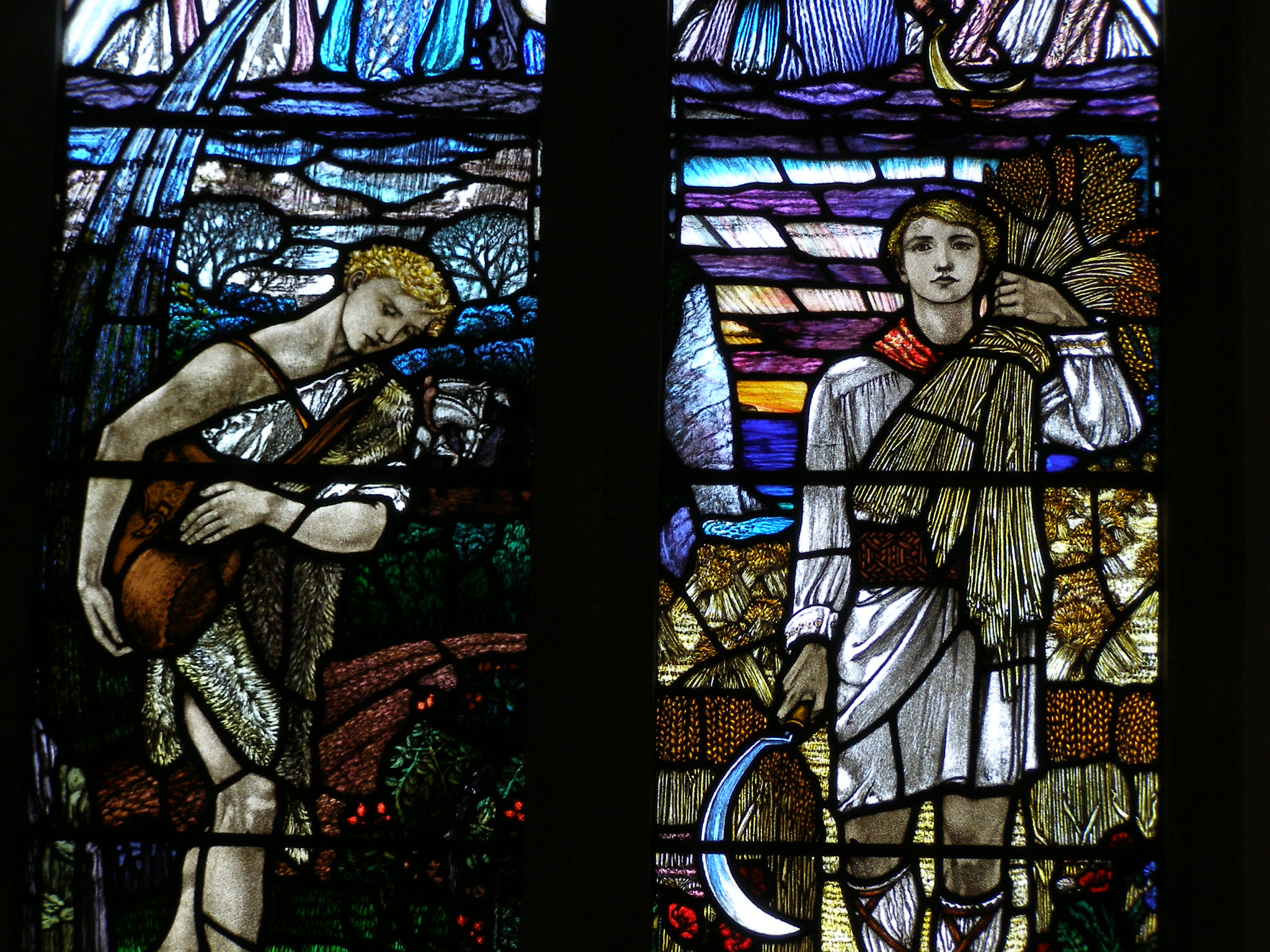
Maiden Bradley window.

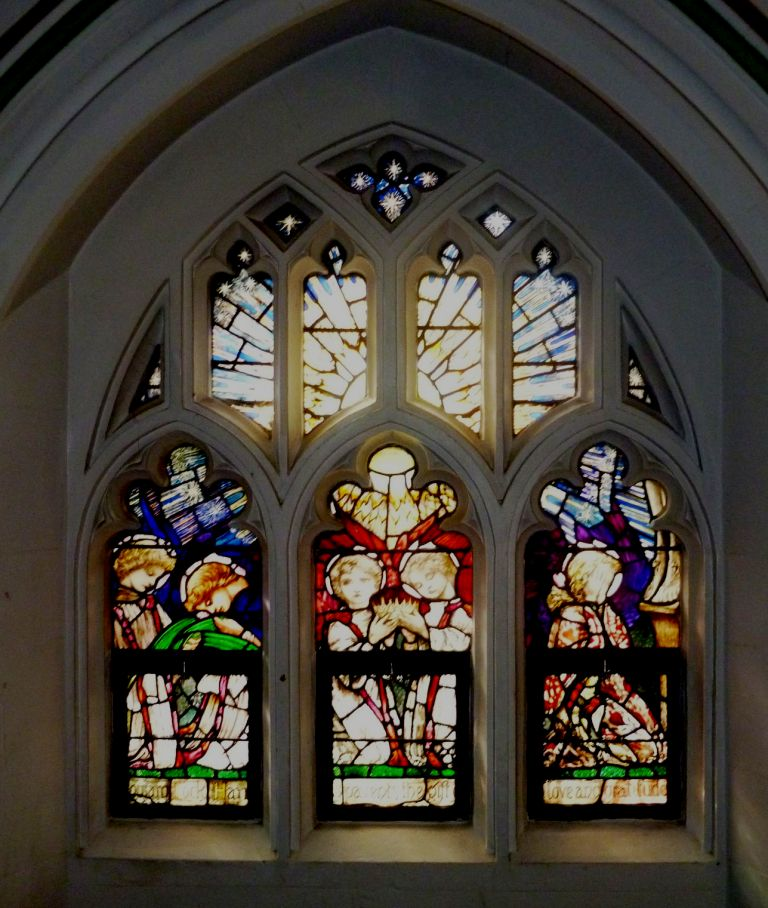
Window in St John the Baptist Church, Cardiff

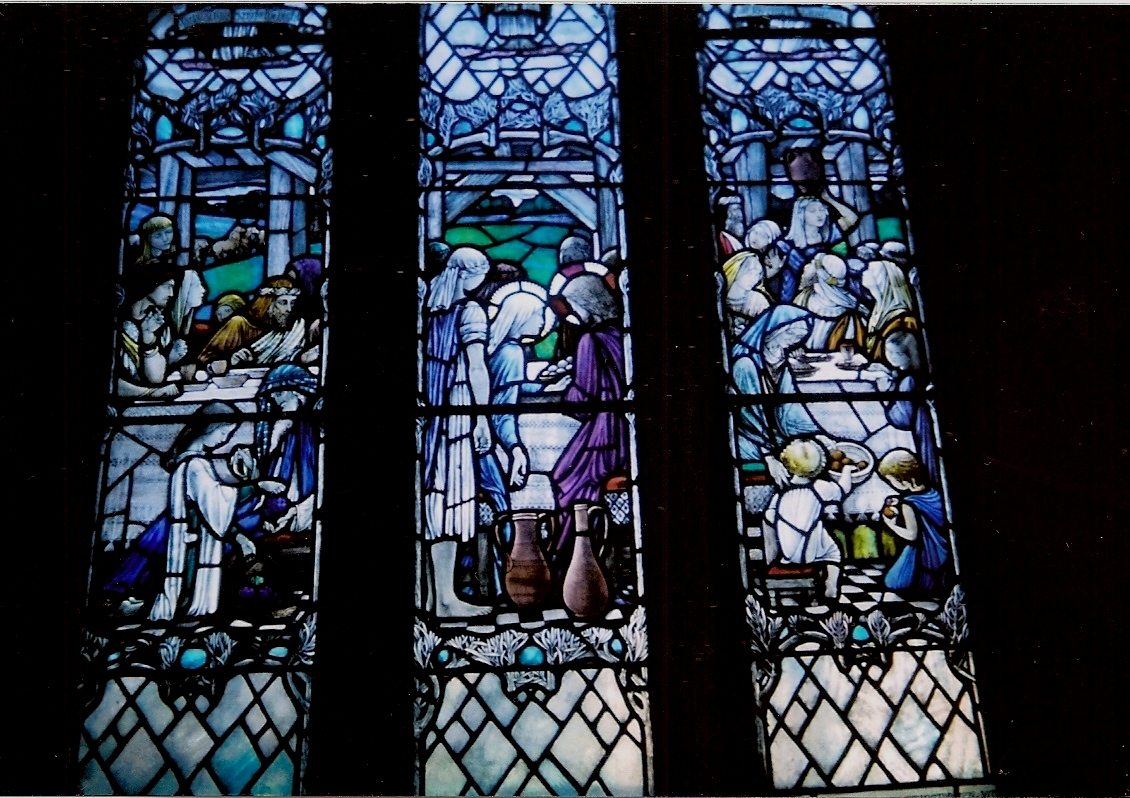
Window in St Mary's Ashby Folville
