= Robert Dunsire =

Recipient of the Victoria Cross

Robert Dunsire VC
- Born: 24 November 1891; Buckhaven, Fife, Scotland
- Died: 30 January 1916 (aged 24); Mazingarbe, France
- Burial place: Mazingarbe Communal Cemetery
- Military career
- Allegiance: United Kingdom
- Branch: British Army
- Service years: 1915–1916 †
- Rank: Corporal
- Units: Royal Scots
- Conflicts: World War I
- Awards: Victoria Cross

Robert Dunsire VC (24 November 1891 – 30 January 1916) was a Scottish recipient of the Victoria Cross, the highest and most prestigious award for gallantry in the face of the enemy that can be awarded to British and Commonwealth forces.

Dunsire was born in November 1891 to Thomas and Elizabeth Anderson Dunsire at Buckhaven in Fife. At the outbreak of war in 1914, Robert was a miner at the Fife Coal Company's Rosie Pit and married to Catherine Pitt. He enlisted in January 1915 joining the 13th Battalion, The Royal Scots (The Lothian Regiment), British Army. It was during the First World War when the following deed took place for which he was awarded the VC for his actions during the Battle of Loos, on 26 September 1915.

== Citation ==
For most conspicuous bravery on Hill 70 on 26th Sept., 1915. Pte. Dunsire went out under very heavy fire and rescued a wounded man from between the firing lines. Later, when another man considerably nearer the German lines was heard shouting for help, he crawled out again with utter disregard to the enemy's fire and carried him in also. Shortly afterwards the Germans attacked over this ground.

— London Gazette, No. 29371, 16 November 1915

He later achieved the rank of corporal. He was killed in action at Mazingarbe in France on 30 January 1916 and is buried there.

His VC is displayed at the Royal Scots Museum, Edinburgh Castle, Scotland.
