= Margaret Chilton =

British stained glass artist and instructor

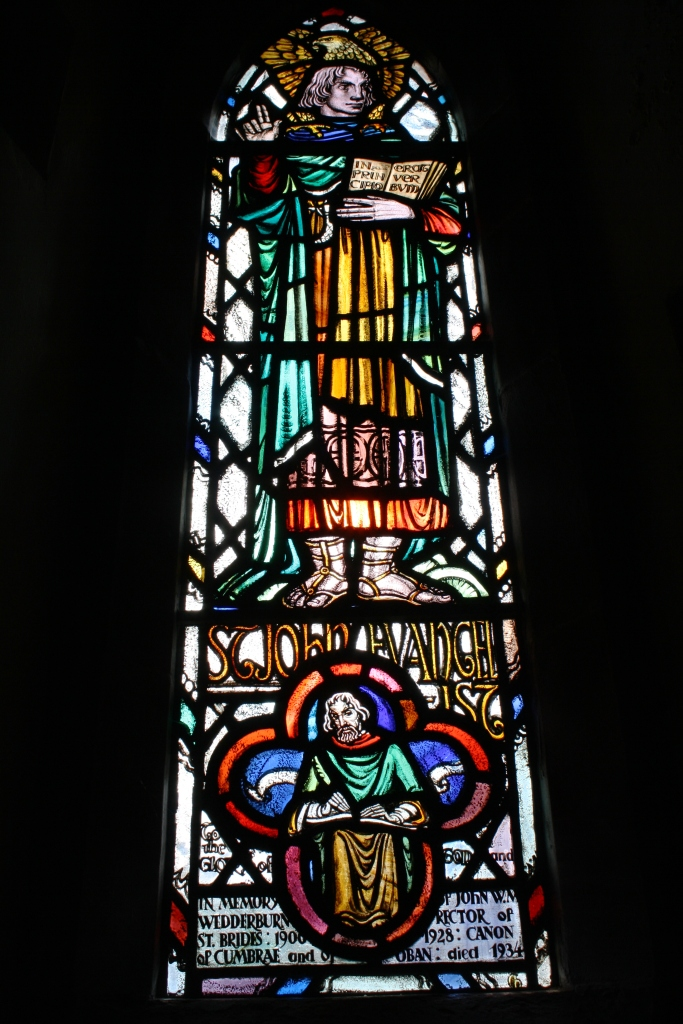
Margaret Chilton Window in St Bride's Church in the Highlands of Scotland. Image courtesy Reverend Adrian Fallows.

Margaret Isobel Chilton (1875–1963), born at Clifton, Bristol, was a British stained glass artist and instructor.

== Career ==
In the early 1900s she attended the Royal College of Art in London, where she was taught by Christopher Whall. In about 1906 she returned to Bristol where she set up her own stained glass studio. In 1918 she moved to Glasgow to take up a post at the Abbey Studio and taught for a period at the Glasgow School of Art.

In Glasgow Chilton met Marjorie Boyce Kemp (1886–1975) who was a pupil at the Glasgow School of Art and in 1922 she set up in partnership with Kemp and opened a studio at 13a George Street in Edinburgh. After a few years they moved to 12 Queen Street. She was to spend most of her working life in Scotland. She and Kemp worked together on many occasions, always working strictly in accordance with Arts and Crafts movement principles.

She was an Associate member of the Royal College of Art and a member of the Royal West Academy in Bristol. In some instances her windows were made in collaboration with Lowndes & Drury, owned by Mary Lowndes and Alfred J. Drury.

She died on 25 June 1963.

== Works in Parish Churches ==
This is a listing of Margaret Chilton's major works, listed where possible in date order. Where a work was done in collaboration with Marjorie Kemp this is indicated in the text.

| Church | Location | Date(s) | Subject, notes and references |
|---|---|---|---|
| Pilton Parish Church | Pilton, Somerset | | This was Margaret Chiltons' first commission. A three-light, traceried window has Jesus in the central light. He is holding a lamb and in the other two lights Chilton depicts various sheep. See image below. |
| St John the Evangelist | Clifton, Bristol, Wiltshire | 1912 | A three light window commissioned as a memorial to Jane and Louisa Appleton. Entitled Feed My Lambs, it depicts the risen Jesus with Simon Peter, women and children. The window is now displayed in the Stained Glass Museum at Ely Cathedral, following the closure of the St John's Church in 1984. |
| St Alban | Bristol, Wiltshire | 1915 | Chilton designed a window to celebrate completion of the building of the church in 1915. It depicts various craftsmen and the completed church. This church, in the Westbury Park area of Bristol, also holds much stained glass by Arnold Robinson. |
| St. John the Baptist | Croydon, Outer London | 1918 | Chilton designed a Memorial Window for this church celebrating the service given by the Navy in The Great War. The inscription reads “TO THE GLORY OF GOD TO COMMEMORATE THE HEROIC SERVICE RENDERED BY THE NAVY DURING THE GREAT WAR THIS WINDOW WAS PRESENTED BY W HAROLD AND A GERTRUDE EVE” The window is a six-light window and was made in collaboration with Lowndes & Drury. |
| St Andrew | Kilbowie, Dunbartonshire | 1920 | A two-light window designed by Chilton for this church remembers those who fell in The Great War. Window made by The City Glass Company. It was dedicated on 30 October 1920. |
| St Mary | Chelsea, Inner London | 1948 | Chilton executed a single light window for the South Aisle of this church. The window depicts the Blessed Virgin Mary. See image below. |
| St James | Silsoe, Bedfordshire | 1924 | A single-light window in the north transept depicts the “Virgin and Child” and is in memory of Bessie Olney who died in 1921. |
| St Andrew | Hampstead, London | | Two windows in this church were designed and made with Marjorie Kemp in their Edinburgh studios. |
| Chalmers Memorial Church | Port Seton, East Lothian | 1924–1950 | This church is regarded as being an excellent example of Arts and Crafts design. Chilton designed several windows for the church between 1924 and 1950, working with Marjorie Kemp. |
| North Morningside United Presbyterian | Morningside | 1928 and 1930 | This is no longer an active church but is now the Eric Liddell Centre. The original church windows remain intact. There are two Chilton/Kemp Windows, each of three lights and in the West Clerestory. The 1928 window is called “Him declare I unto you." and features St Paul at Athens. It illustrates Paul preaching to the philosophers at the Areopagus in Athens, Acts 17. Verse 23. Paul draws attention to the fact that they are so religious that they even have an altar to an unknown God. He then goes on to say that what they worship as unknown, “Him declare I unto you.” He then tells them about the Creator God who enables those who seek to find him and repent of their wrongdoing. Among those who believed were Dionysius and Damaris, both of whom are represented in the tableau. By using words from 2 Corinthians 5:17, the artists are endeavouring to increase our understanding of the change that is being brought about in the lives of believers through their relationship with Christ. The Greek text on the window makes it one of only four in Edinburgh to be inscribed in such a manner. The window is dedicated to James Gilchrist Goold who was minister at the church from 1914 to 1923. The second three-light window is entitled “Come unto me” and was installed in March 1930. The theme is “Caring”. The centre light depicts Jesus' core call to humanity, "Come unto me" and above are depictions of the Annunciation and Nativity. Below we see the Crucifixion. The outer lights are made up of panels that highlight the reading of scripture, instruction of children and images from scripture that encourage care of others based on Matthew 25 v 34 - 35. The window is dedicated to “The men and women of faith who founded the church". |
| St Andrew | Leytonstone, Greater London | 1919-1955 | Chilton completed some fifteen windows for this church, which the Pevsner Architectural Guide calls "her most important commission in England". |
| Laurieston Parish Church | Laurieston, Stirlingshire | 1926 and 1932. | Three windows were completed for this church. Laurieston is a village some 4 miles from Falkirk. Windows feature “Our Lord with workers in local industries”. The window was designed and made with Marjorie Kemp. The flanking lights, depicting various Saints were completed in 1932. According to John Gifford and Frank Arneil Walker in “The Buildings of Scotland: Stirling and Central Scotland” ISBN 0-300-09594-5"- “all are clearly drawn with a characteristic hint of febrility” |
| Colvend Parish Church | Colvend, Dumfries and Galloway | 1926 | The West window in the Aisle of this church was designed and made with Marjorie Kemp. According to John Gifford in “The Buildings of Scotland: Dumfries and Galloway” ISBN 0-14-071067-1, the design shows “a fey-looking St John accompanied by a determined eagle.” |
| St Leonard | St Andrews, Fife | 1926 to 1954 | Chilton worked on several windows for this church which was built in 1904. One window depicts St Margaret of Scotland. Chilton includes Edinburgh Castle Rock and St Margaret's Chapel in the design as well as the Arms of Scotland and Edward the Confessor. The window was presented to the church by Col. Oswald and Mrs. Dykes in memory of their aunt, Mary Josephine Wallace, wife of the Reverend R.W. Wallace. The window “Breaking of the Alabaster Box and Raising of Lazarus” dates to 1934 and was presented by the congregation in memory of the Revd Robert Wilfred Wallace who was the minister at St Leonard's from 1898 to 1932. Another window depicts the “Transfiguration”. This is dated 1954 and celebrates the Jubilee of the church and the 20 elders who died during that 50 years period. The names of these elders appear on a bronze plate by the window. Chilton's “Crucifixion and Emmaus Story” is the earliest of Chilton's works in the church dating to 1926. The window is in memory of Mr. Alexander Thoms, an elder at the church for 41 years. “Triumphal Entry” and the “Last Supper” were windows executed in 1928, this time Chilton being assisted by Marjorie Kemp. “St Leonard Liberating the Prisoners” dates to 1943 and was presented by F.M. Heddle in memory of his sister, C.S.Thoms, the wife of Alexander Thoms. Chilton also designed the Memorial Window to those who perished in the 1939-45 war. This was installed in 1946 and depicts a “Healing scene” and “The Cleansing of the Temple". |
| St Callan | Rogart, Highlands | 1929 | In this church are two small stained glass memorial windows on either side of the pulpit. They are entitled “Nativity” and “Penitence” and were designed and made by Margaret Chilton and Marjorie Kemp |
| St John's Kirk of Perth | Perth, Perth and Kinross | 1929 and 1930 | Margaret Chilton and Marjorie Kemp designed and made two windows for this church. The window installed in 1929 was titled “The Feeding the Five Thousand “ and the second, installed in 1930, has the theme of “Resurrection” and “Healing” and is a two-light window. This is in the North Choir Aisle. Its main feature is the depiction of a blind boy being led to Our Lord. Marjorie Kemp did a further window in 1933 illustrating the “Nativity.” |
| Kirton Manor Parish Church | Kirkton, Peebles | 1931 | Chilton's East window depicts St Francis and Margaret |
| Scottish National Portrait Gallery | Edinburgh, Lothian | 1932 | Chilton and Kemp designed an armorial window for the south windows in the Gallery's Central Hall. |
| Edinburgh City Chambers | Edinburgh, Lothian | 1932 | Chilton, working with Marjorie Kemp, designed and made an armorial stained glass window for the north west rooms of the Chambers. |
| Craigmillar Park Church | Newington, Edinburgh | 1933 and 1938 | Chilton, working with Marjorie Kemp, designed and made two windows for this church. In the south transept there is a three-light window depicting “St Michael”, “Christ with children” and “Christ healing the sick”, this dated 1933 and one of two lights depicting “John the Baptist” and “Zacchaeus” this installed in 1938. |
| Dirleton Parish Church | Dirleton, East Lothian | 1936 | In the Aisle of Dirleton Parish Church is Chilton's three-light window depicting “St Francis and the Animals”. |
| St Cuthbert | Colinton, Lothian | 1935 | Chilton designed a three-light window in the Lady Chapel. The left panel depicts St Margaret with Edinburgh Castle Rock and St Margaret's Chapel behind her right shoulder. Her symbol, the marguerite, is in the lower right hand corner. The middle panel depicts Mary, mother of Jesus and two lily flowers. The right panel depicts Saint George with the slain dragon. In the lower right hand corner is the badge of the King's Own Scottish Borderers. |
| St Bride's Church | Onich, North Ballachulish, Highlands | 1935 | For the Chancel's Couth wall Chilton designed and made a single light window portraying “St John the Evangelist”. See image above. |
| St Mary | Walton-on-Thames, Surrey | 1938 | Chilton designed and made a three-light East window with the theme of “The Crucifixion”. |
| St John the Evangelist | Alloa | 1939 | Chilton executed the centre light in the East window in the North wall of the Aisle. Described as “a strongly coloured depiction of the Annunciation set against a background of obscured plain glass” |
| St. Andrew | Eastbourne, Sussex | 1946 | Chilton was responsible for a single light in the church's North Chapel. It depicts the Annunciation, the Nativity and some Angels. The window was given in memory of a Georgina Secretan, a long-standing member of St Andrew's. |
| Holy Trinity Church | Crockham Hill, Kent | 1948 | Chilton executed a two-light window in the South Nave of this church depicting “St. George” and “St. Augustine”. |
| Church of the Good Shepherd | Edinburgh, Lothian | 1935 and 1943 | This Murrayfield church, which was one of Sir Robert Lorimer’s first commissions, has several Chilton windows. In the South side of the church are two lights entitled “Christ’s Nativity” and “Christ’s Baptism”, these dating to 1935 and in 1943 two more lights were added, “Christ Healing the Sick” and “Christ washing His disciples feet”. The church was dedicated in 1899. |
| St Margaret's Queen of Scotland Episcopal Church with Boundary Walls | Leven, Fife | 1948 | Chilton designed and made the window in the South Nave entitled “'Baptism, Fasting, Temptation”. |
| St James the Great | Dollar, Stirlingshire | 1949 | Chilton's window features Our Lord and Little Children. |
| Belhaven-Westbourne Church | Glasgow, Lanarkshire | 1951 | Chilton designed and made a window for this church. |
| Tranent Parish Church | Tranent, East Lothian | 1953 | Chilton designed and made a three-light West window and had help from Marjorie Kemp on the centre light depicting “Christ and the four Evangelists”. |
| St Finnian | Lochgelly, Fife | 1949 and 1950 | Chilton's first work for this church was in 1949 when she designed the single light window “Sanctus”. This is in what was the Lady Chapel and is now the vestry. In 1950 she designed a three-light East window entitled “Christ the High Priest.” |
| Bearsden Cross Parish Church | Bearsden, East Dunbartonshire | 1955 | A three-light window depicting “The Risen Lord” and “St Mary Magdalene” with Old and New Testament figures in the side lights. See image in gallery below. |
| Holy Trinity Scottish Episcopal Church | Stirling, Stirlingshire | 1952 to 1955 | The earliest of five Chilton windows in this church dates from 1951 and depicts “St Elizabeth of Hungary (1207-1231)”. It is inscribed "This window was bequeathed by Caroline Ethel Spurway in 1944, in loving memory of her parents, Major-General John Spurway and Caroline Dundas (née Stirling) his wife and of her elder sister Christian Aimée Spurway." Another Chilton window is entitled “St Columba” and dates to 1952. The window is in memory of Charles Herbert Thomson, who died 17 July 1951 and was commissioned by his wife Janet H Thomson. St Columba is shown on a missionary journey to the Picts. In part of the window he is shown in a coracle crossing the Irish Sea to come to Scotland. Charles Herbert Thomson had been the governor of a Sudanese province before retiring to Stirling. Another 1952 window depicts Francis of Assisi and is inscribed: "In memory of William Kellock (Benefactor)”. St Francis is shown preaching to the birds. He is also shown receiving the sigmata which he is said to have borne, unknown to others, until his death at the age of 45. William Curtis Kellock was an ironmonger's clerk who served on the Vestry for many years. Slightly later is the window “Andrew” completed in 1955 and inscribed: "To the glory of God in memory of her sons Ian Livingstone who died March 9th 1942 and Charles Livingstone who died January 10th 1954, given by their loving mother." The window depicts St Andrew with the saltire cross. He bears a fishing net, the mark of his original trade. His association with Scotland, of which he is patron saint, derives from the moving of at least some his relics from Patras in Greece to what is now St Andrews in Fife by St Rule in the 8th century. Flying Officer Ian Frederick Livingstone was shot down over the Netherlands, aged 25, while flying an Avro Manchester from RAF Scampton, Lincolnshire in a thousand-bomber raid on Essen. He is buried in Bergen General Cemetery, Netherlands. Charles Livingstone was a civilian pilot and died in a plane crash while returning as a passenger from Cyprus. The final window in the church by Chilton depicts “St Mary Magdalene” and is inscribed: "In memory of Alice, Emily. Elizabeth & Helen Galbraith (Benefactors)". St Mary Magdalene is usually identified as the sinful woman who anointed Christ's feet in the house of Simon (Luke 7:38). Hence, in this window, she bears a pot of ointment. She is the patron of repentant sinners and of the contemplative life. |
| St Michael | Inveresk, Lothian | | Chilton executed a window for this church depicting “St Bride” and “St Modwenna”. |
| St Luke | Edinburgh, Lothian | | For this church in East Fettes Avenue, Chilton and Kemp designed and made a single light window for the Baptistery Chapel depicting “The Madonna”. |
| Christ Church | Dalbeattie | 1954-55 | A two-light window in this church depicting “Our Lady” and “St John” was designed and made with Marjorie Kemp “more powerful than usual for those artists” |
| Christ Church | South Nutfield, Surrey | 1927 | With Marjorie Kemp, Chilton completed a two-light window in the South Chancel area, depicting St Peter and St Paul and in memory the Reverend Charles Fison. |

== Other work ==
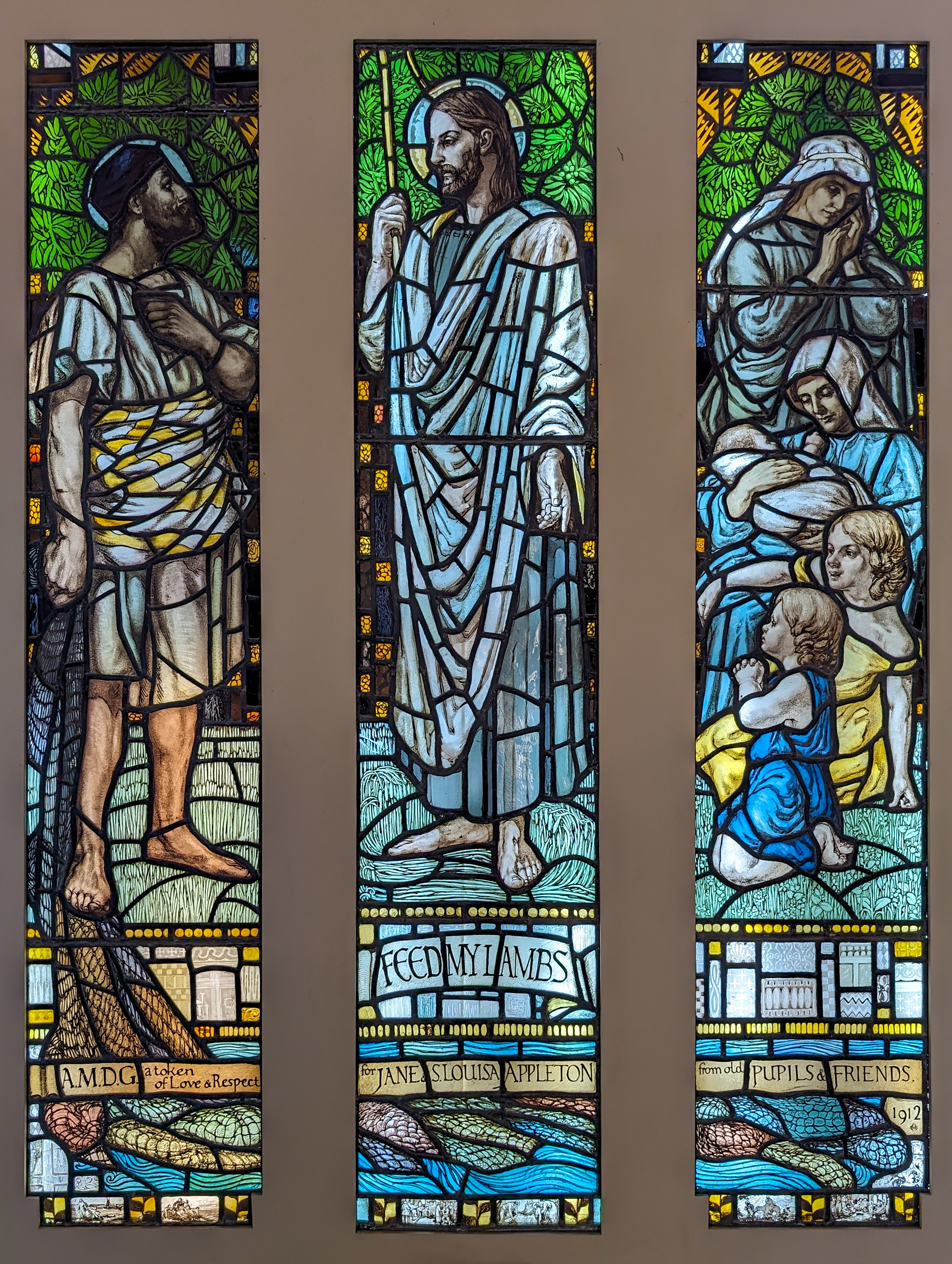
"Feed My Lambs" in the Stained Glass Museum, Ely

There is a Margaret Chilton window, “The Appleton Memorial Window” entitled “Feed My Lambs” and dating to 1912 at the Stained Glass Museum, Ely, Cambridgeshire. The window came from St John's Church, Clifton, Bristol and was a memorial to Jane and Louisa Appleton. The three-light window depicts Jesus with Simon Peter and some women and children.

In St Bride's Church in Hyndland, Glasgow there is a painting by Chilton of “The Entombment” which serves as an altar piece. It was presented to the church in 1919. This is a George Frederick Bodley designed church built in 1903–1904. Chilton had been a member of St Bride's for several years whilst living and working in Glasgow.

Warriston Crematorium was originally East Warriston House, a two-story villa built in 1808 by banker Andrew Bonar. It was converted into a crematorium in 1929 with Sir Robert Lorimer as the architect. The building has stained glass by Margaret Chilton and Marjorie Kemp.

== Gallery ==
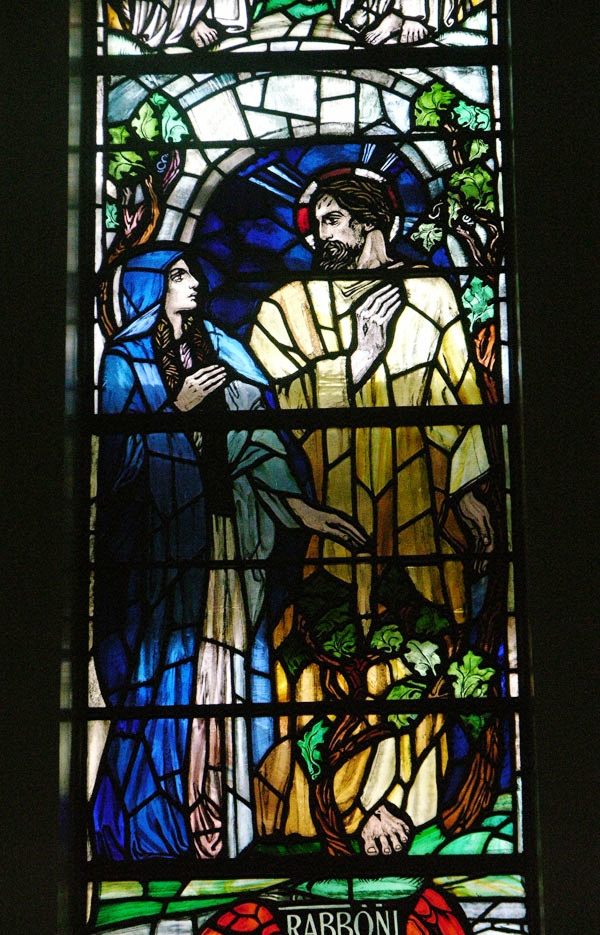
Margaret Chilton stained glass window in Glasgow Church

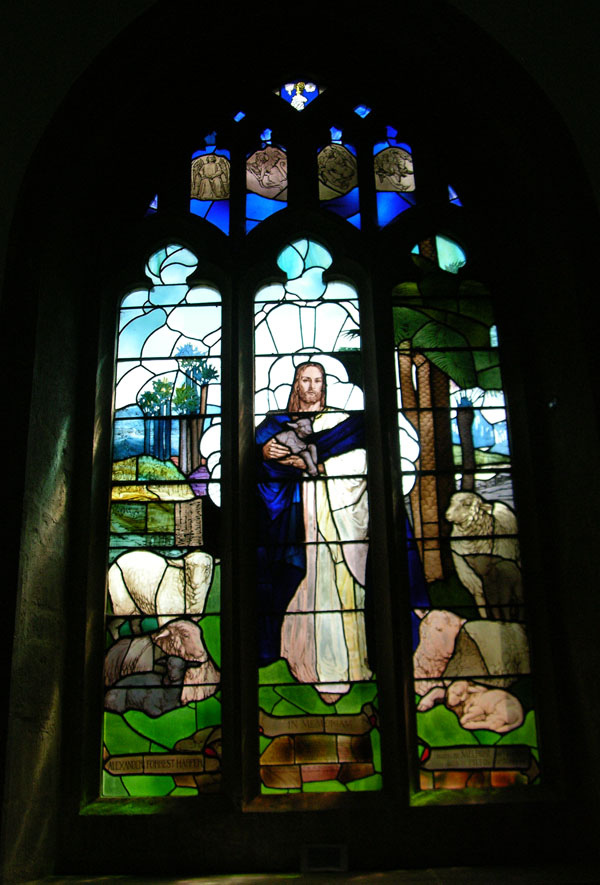
Window in Pilton Parish Church, Somerset

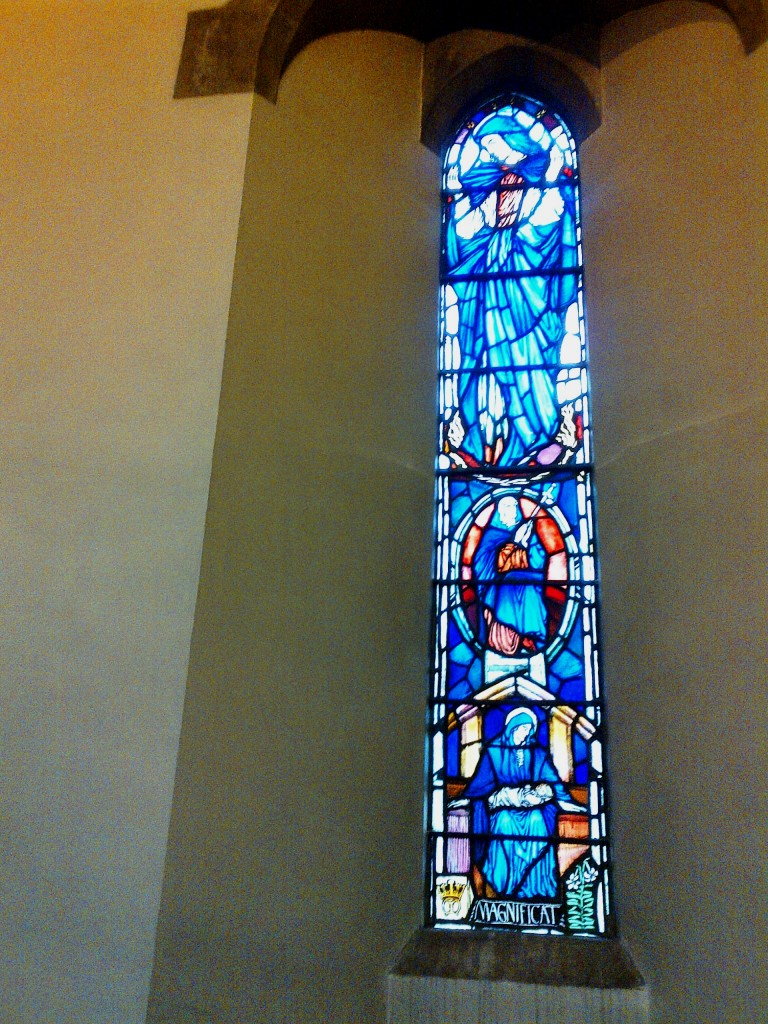
Window in St Mary's Church, Chelsea. Courtesy Maria Cristina White-da Cruz
