= Buckhaven =

Coordinates: 56.1776°N 3.0303°W

Buckhaven: Scottish Gaelic: Baile 'Ic Eòghainn; Scots: Buckhyne / Buckhind
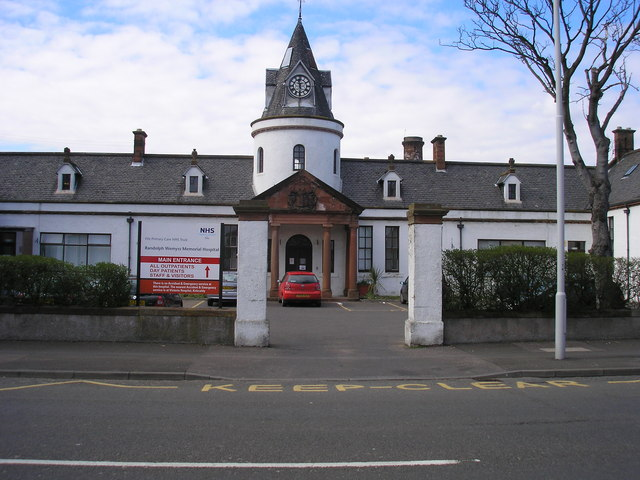
- The Randolph Wemyss Memorial Hospital, Buckhaven

- Location within Fife
- Population: 4,050 (2020)
- OS grid reference: NT361988
- Council area: Fife
- Country: Scotland
- Sovereign state: United Kingdom
- Post town: Leven
- Postcode district: KY8
- Dialling code: 01592
- Police: Scotland
- Fire: Scottish
- Ambulance: Scottish
- UK Parliament: Glenrothes
- Scottish Parliament: Kirkcaldy

Buckhaven is a town on the east coast of Fife, Scotland, on the Firth of Forth between East Wemyss and Methil. Buckhaven is on the Fife Coastal Path, and near to Wemyss Caves and Largo Bay.

== History ==
The name Buckhaven is probably from the Scots terms buck or bukk "to gush out" and haven or "harbour".

Once a thriving weaving village and fishing port, in 1831 it was reported as having the second-largest fishing fleet in Scotland with a total of 198 boats. Fishing declined during the 19th century, but in the 1860s Buckhaven developed more into a mining town. Although coal waste blackened its beaches and silted up its now non-existent harbour, it later became a Fife coast holiday resort and recreation area for locals. Nowadays, it is classed as one of Fife's 'Regeneration areas' in need of regeneration both socially and economically.

The first element is probably related to the Sc verb buck, bukk, ‘to pour forth, gush out’ (DSL), perhaps describing the coastal waters at Buckhaven, which is situated at a point where the Fife coastline swings a little further out into the North Sea. A related element occurs also in Buckie Burn DFL q.v. The second element is certainly Sc haven ‘harbour’, and the ‘fishers of Buckhaven’ are mentioned in the earliest known record from 1527 (Fraser, Wemyss ii no. 187).

In 1778, the minister of Wemyss Parish, Rev. Dr Harry Spens, wrote of his own flock at Buckhaven, ‘... the original inhabitants of Buckhaven were from the Netherlands about the time of Philip II of Spain (died 1598). Their vessel had been stranded on the shore. They proposed to settle and remain. The family of Wemyss gave them permission. They accordingly settled at Buckhaven. By degrees they acquired our language and adopted our dress, and for these threescore years past have had the character of a sober and sensible, an industrious and honest people. The only singularity in their ancient customs that I remember to have heard of was that of a richly ornamented girdle or belt, wore by the brides of good condition and character at their marriage, and then laid aside and given in like manner to the next bride that should be deemed worthy of such an honour. The village consists at present of about 140 families, 60 of which are fishers, the rest land-labourers, weavers and other mechanics.’ (OSA 790–1).

There is no doubt that the people of Buckhaven were regarded as different in speech and manners from surrounding communities, and it is probably in this context that such stories grew up (Millar 1895 ii, 50). One Paul Buk, a Dane, is recommended by the Synod to the Presbytery of Kirkcaldy in 1652 (Stevenson 1900, 384); such local encounters might have confirmed folk in their belief that Buckhaven was foreign.

/bʌkˈhevən/, locally /bʌkˈhain/. This latter pronunciation has given rise to the name of a Buckhaven public house, the Buck and Hind.

According to online sources and authors, the fishing community of Buckhaven is said to have been largely the descendants of Norsemen who settled in the district in the 9th century. Centuries later, Buckhaven's fisherfolk bought an Episcopal Church in St Andrews in 1869 and transported it stone by stone to Buckhaven, using fishing boats. The church was restored in the 1980s and converted into a theatre. Many years before, St Andrews had been combined with the other local Church of Scotland churches into one parish. The building continued to be owned by Buckhaven Parish Church after the conversion.

The Second Edition Five Inch Ordnance Survey Map of Buckhaven shows the harbour, which now no longer exists. It was completed in 1840 at a cost to the Fishery Board of six thousand pounds. Ths work was carried out because the town was, at that time, one of the most important home bases for men engaged in the herring fishery. In 1912 the Annual Report of the Fishery Board stated "The fishing continues to fall off at this station, the catch being ony half that of the previous year. Persons who were formerly engaged in fishing are now employed at the coal pits". The statistics illustrate this decline:

Fishery Statistics

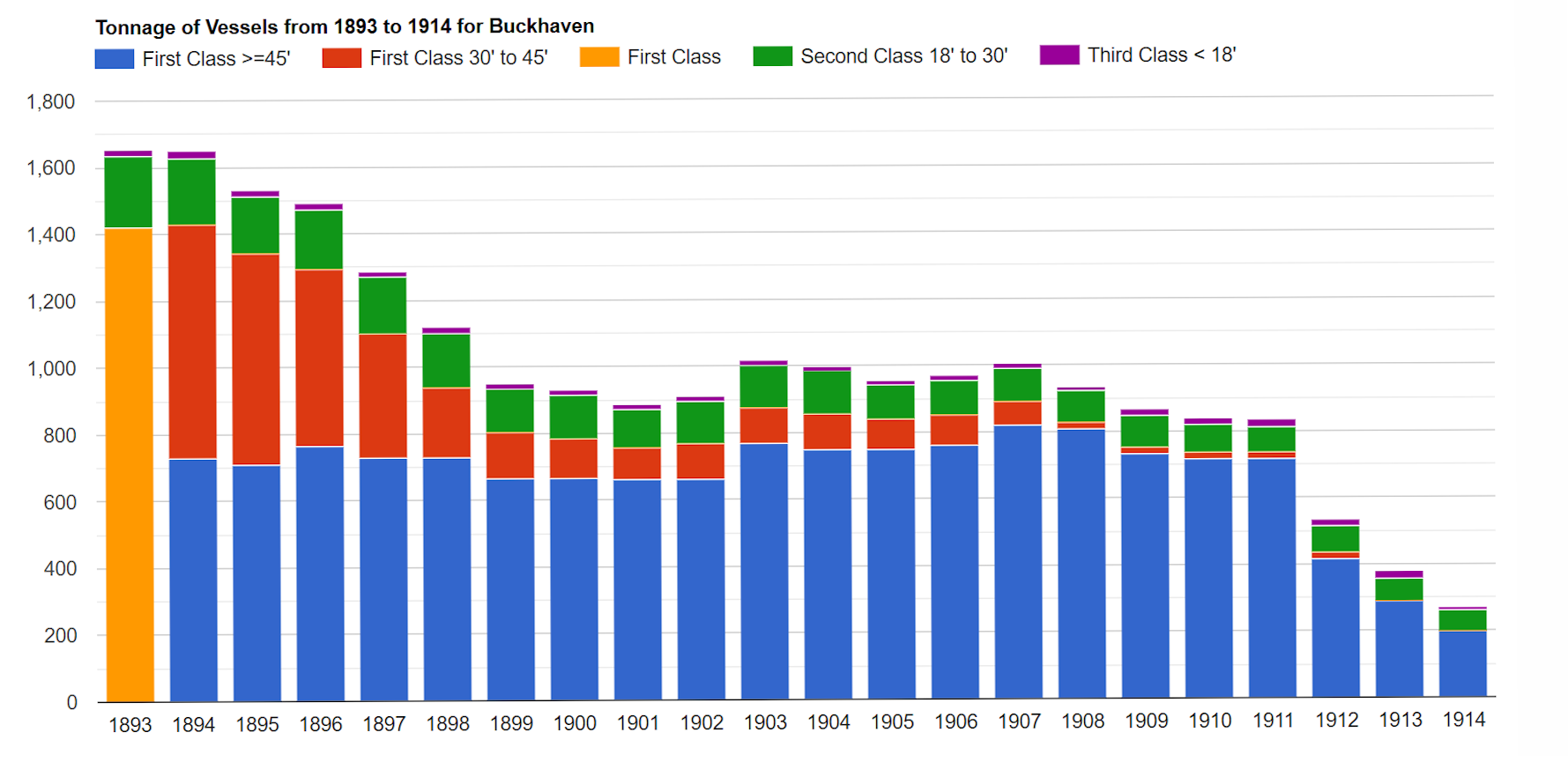
Tonnage of vessels

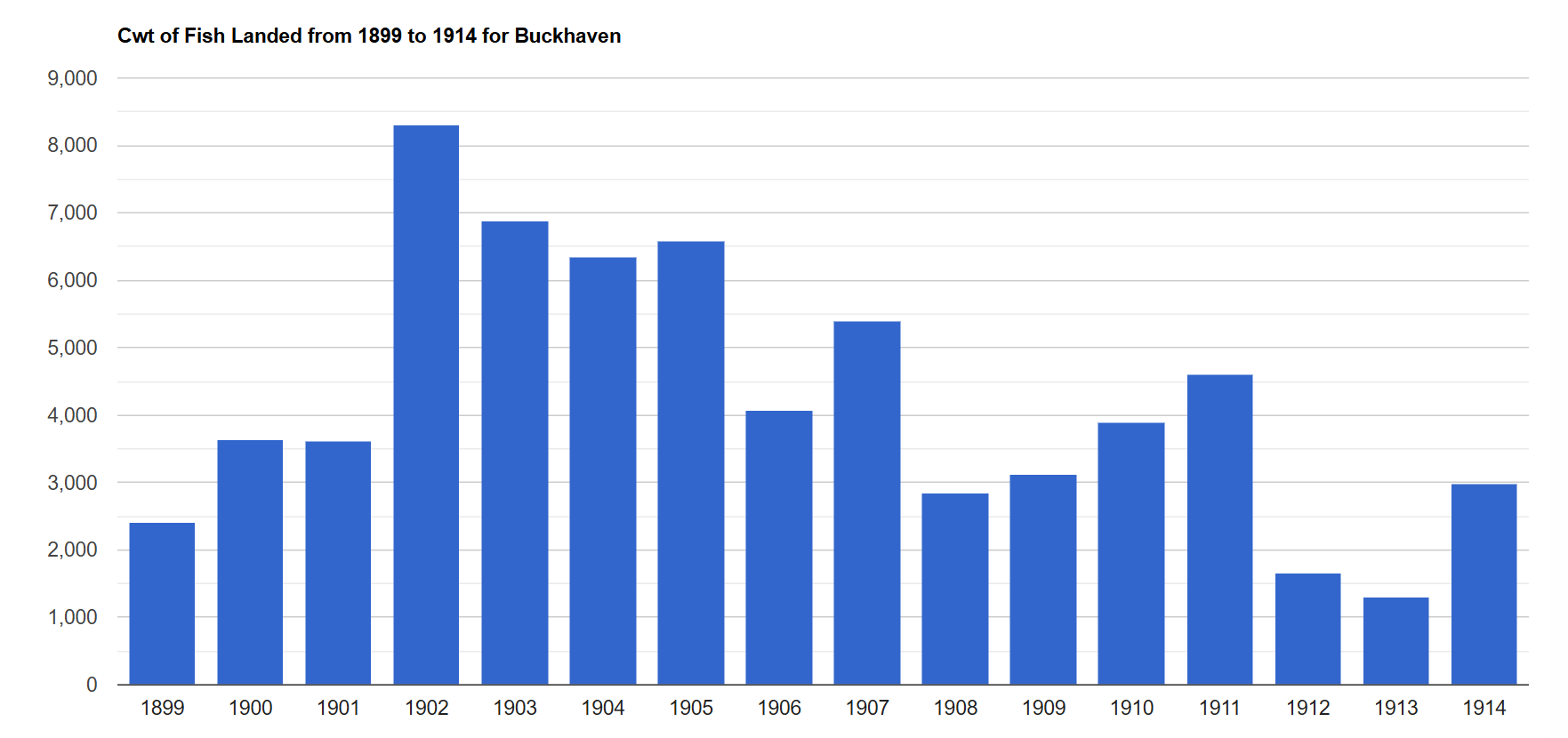
Cwt of fish landed

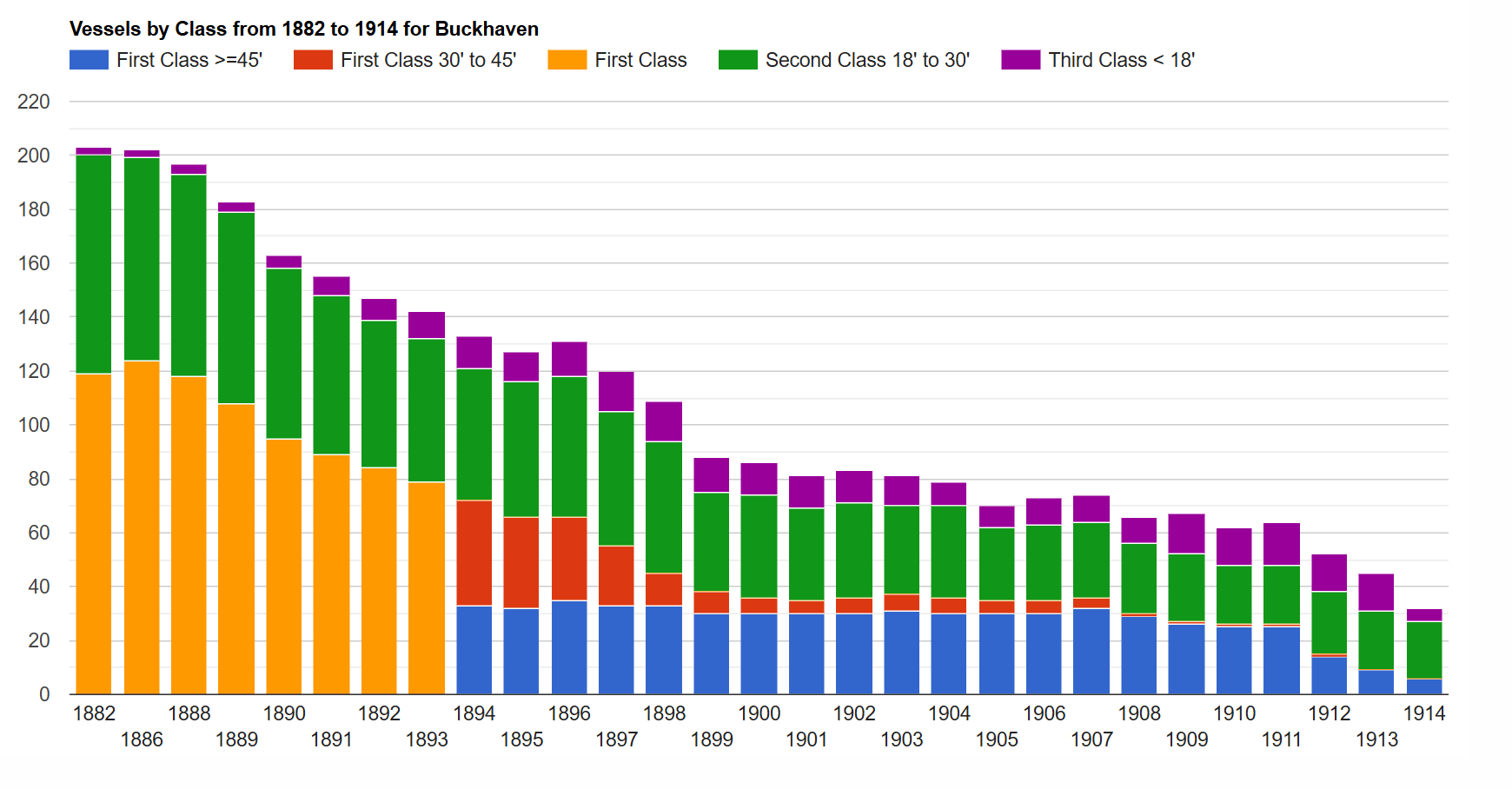
Vessels by class

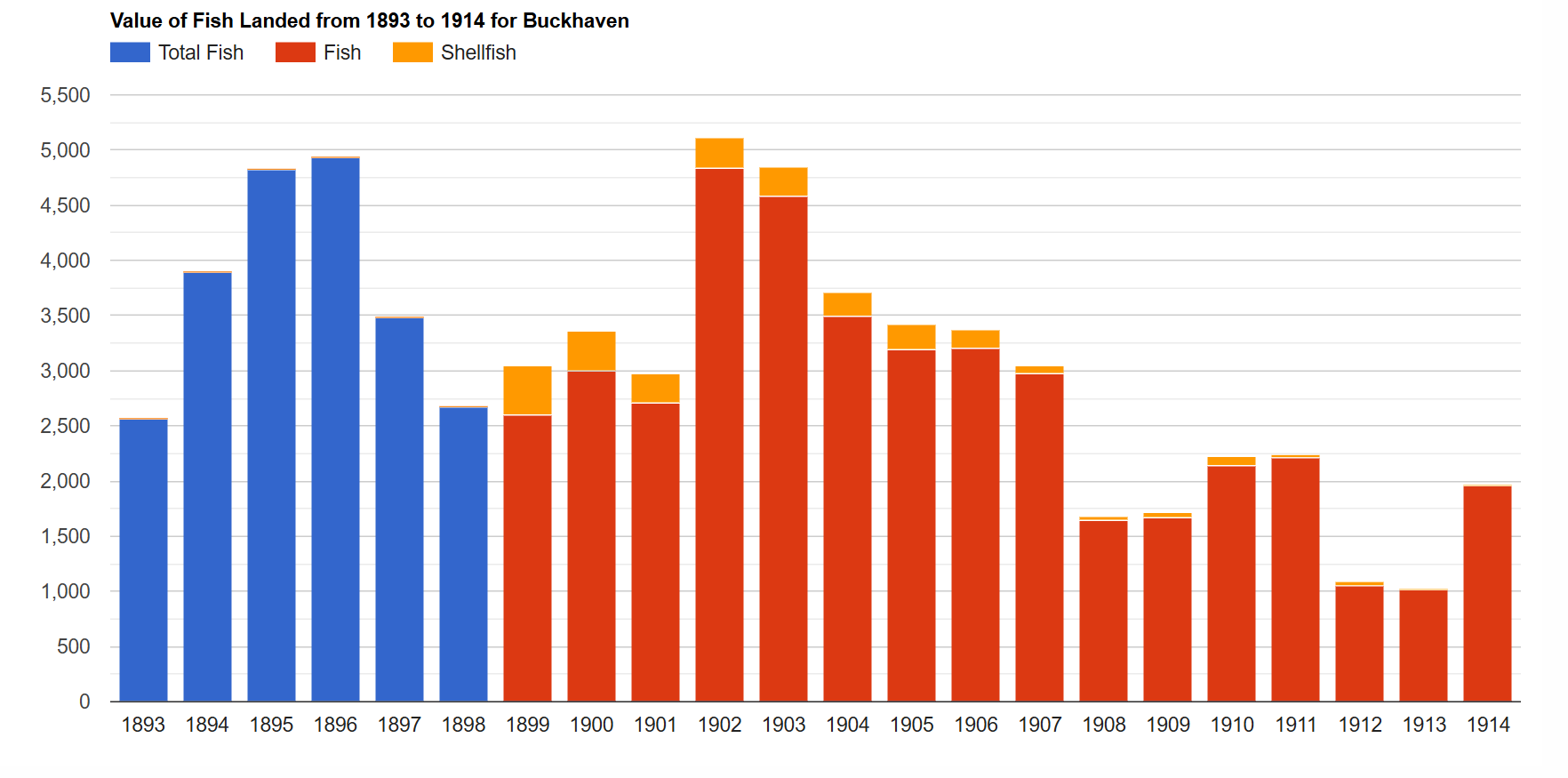
Value (£] of fish landed

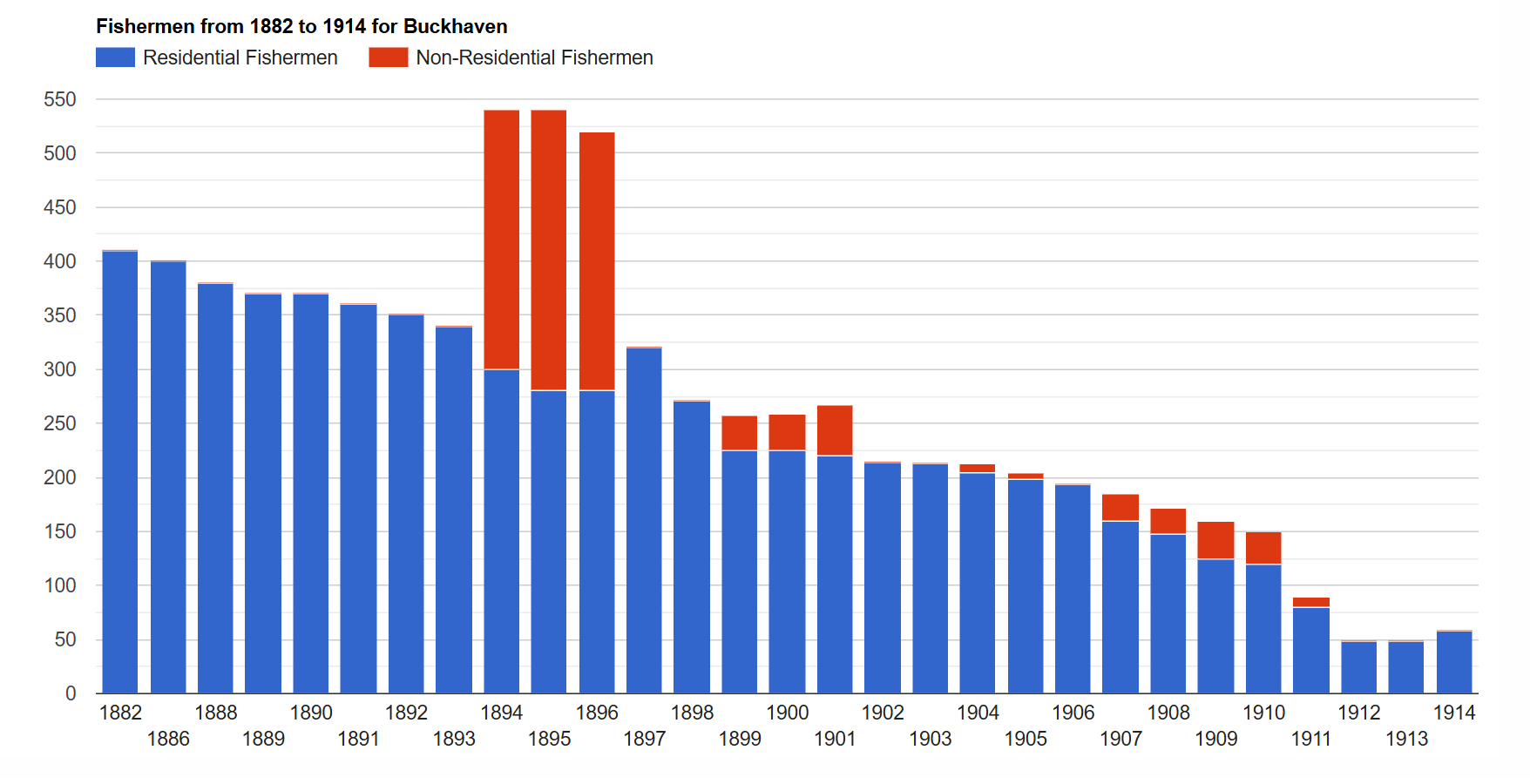
Fishermen

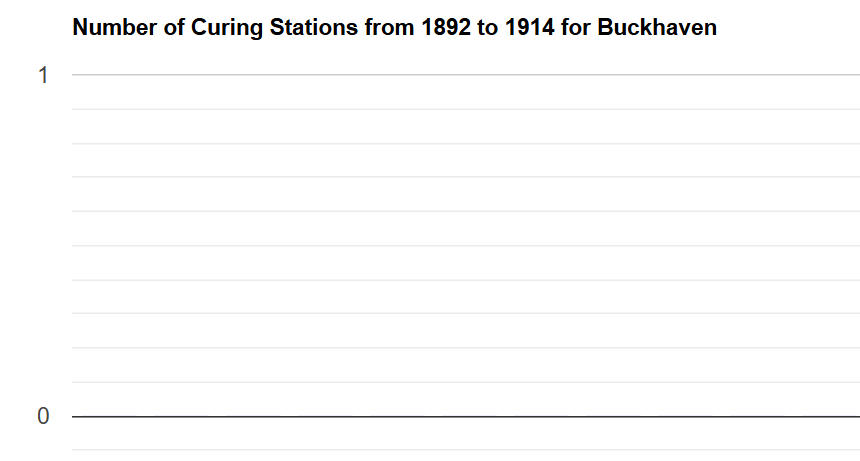
Placeholder-no curing stations

Buckhaven Museum has displays on the history of the fishing industry.

== Census ==
According to estimates in 2006, the population including Methil stood at around 16,240: however, the Levenmouth area including Kennoway, Leven, the Wemyss villages, Largo Bay and Windygates has a combined population of around 37,410. The population of Buckhaven, Methil, Leven is 24,474, according to the 2011 Census.

== Notable people ==
- James Ireland Craig FRSE, meteorologist
- Robert Dunsire, recipient of the Victoria Cross
- Frank O'Donnell, professional footballer
- Hugh O'Donnell, also a professional footballer and brother of Frank O'Donnell
- John Houston, artist
- William Gear, artist
- David McLean (footballer, born 1884), Scottish football player and manager

== See also ==
- List of places in Fife
