= Deborah Dunsire =

Health company executive

- Citizenship: South African
- Known for: oncology, immunology, executive scientific leadership

Deborah Dunsire (b. 1963) is a South African medical doctor and pharmaceutical executive who has been CEO of multiple research companies.

== Career ==
At a 2013 career event at Bentley University, Dunsire remarked that she "...never intended to go into business. But after 9 months waiting for an ophthalmology residency to begin, she instead applied to a position as a clinical researcher" with Novartis.

=== Novartis ===
Dunsire started her career with Novartis in 1988 as an Executive Director of clinical research. She later rose to become Senior Vice President of North American oncology. During her tenure, she was responsible for the launch of blockbuster cancer therapy Gleevec (imatinib).

=== Millennium Pharmaceuticals ===
Dunsire was appointed CEO of Millennium Pharmaceuticals (later Takeda) in 2005, where she was known for her transformational leadership. Notably, she was the first female board member of Takeda when appointed in 2008. She left the company in 2013 after the role of CEO of Millennium was eliminated by Takeda and the formerly autonomous Millennium was integrated into the larger company.

=== EnVivo / FORUM Therapeutics / Xtuit ===
Dunsire was the CEO for a Fidelty Biosciences-backed start-up, EnVivo Pharmaceuticals, starting in 2013. The company later changed its name to FORUM, developing late-state treatments for Alzheimer's Disease. When a Phase 3 clinical trial was unsuccessful, Dunsire left and joined Xtuit for one year.

=== H. Lundbeck A/S ===
Dunsire was appointed as the CEO of Lundbeck, a neuroscience-focused pharmaceutical company based in Denmark, in July 2018.

== Awards ==
- 2018 - Biospace "10 Women CEOs Leading the Charge"
- 2013 - Boston CEO Conference Lifetime Achievement Award
- 2011 - MassBio Innovator Award
- 2009 - Healthcare Businesswomen's Association "Woman of the Year"
