= Christopher Whall works in Gloucester Cathedral =

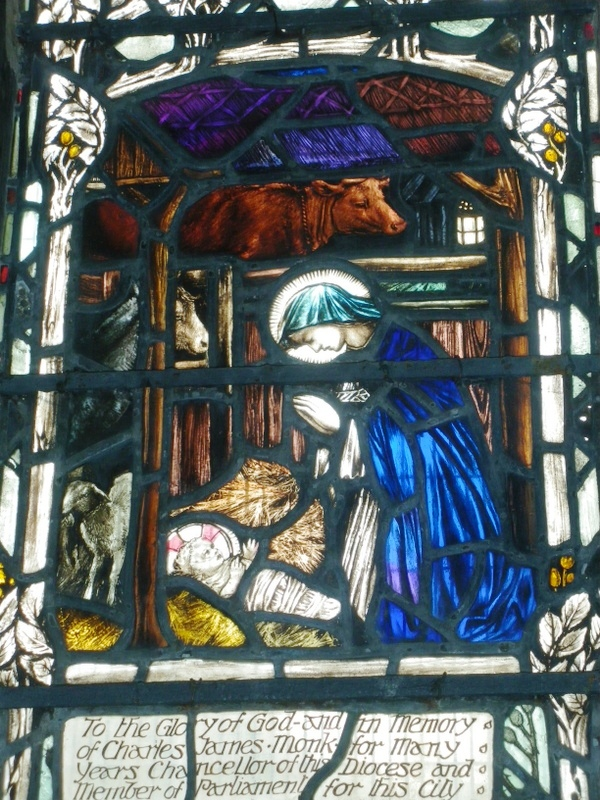
One of the scenes from Mary's life - The Nativity-Window 5

Christopher Whall works in Gloucester Cathedral is a narrative list of works that Christopher Whall executed for Gloucester Cathedral.

"Christopher Whall's windows in Gloucester Lady Chapel are arguably the finest post-medieval stained glass in any of our cathedrals, and, with the possible exception of the unexecuted Christchurch Priory designs, his finest large scale work", William Morris Gallery catalogue

== Ante-Chapel North ==
=== "Man's Fallen State" ===
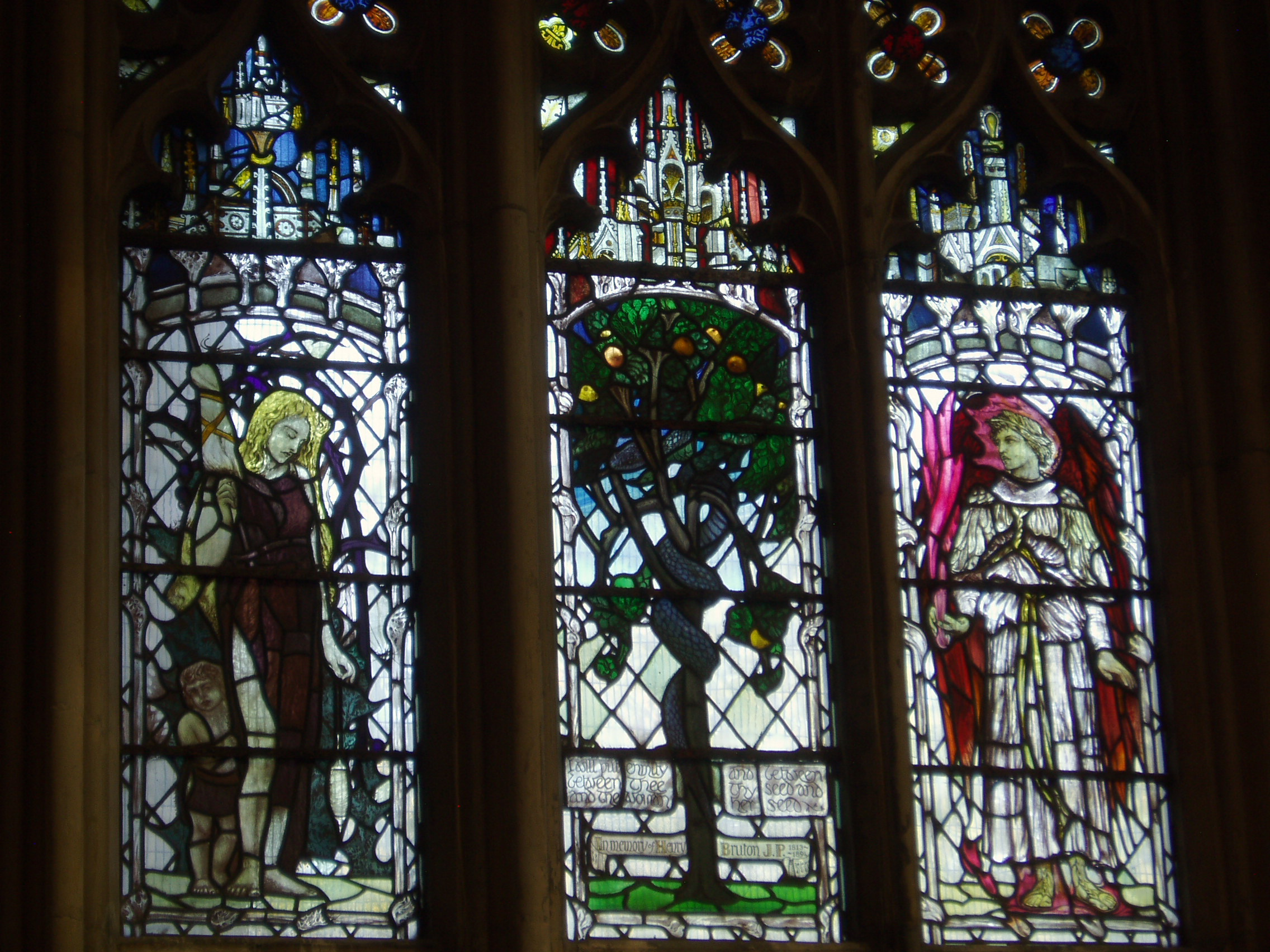
The three-light window "The Fall and Deprivation of Paradise.

"Man's Fallen State"- The Fall and Deprivation of Paradise. Window in the Ante-Chapel North. 1898. This was the first window to be completed and at the top of the window are fragments of old glass found during restoration work in 1895.

In this window Whall takes his inspiration from the Creation Story from the Old Testament (Genesis iii) and in the centre light he draws the serpent wound around the Tree of Knowledge in the Garden of Eden. The inscription reads-"I will put enmity between thee and the woman and between thy seed and her seed". In the left hand light Whall depicts Eve with a child beside her and in the right hand light an angel in red bars the entrance to the garden. An image of this window is shown above. The memorial note was designed by Veronica Whall and inserted into the window in 1928 recording that the window was given in memory of Henry Bruton, J.P.(1813–1894).

=== The Restoration in the Sacrament ===
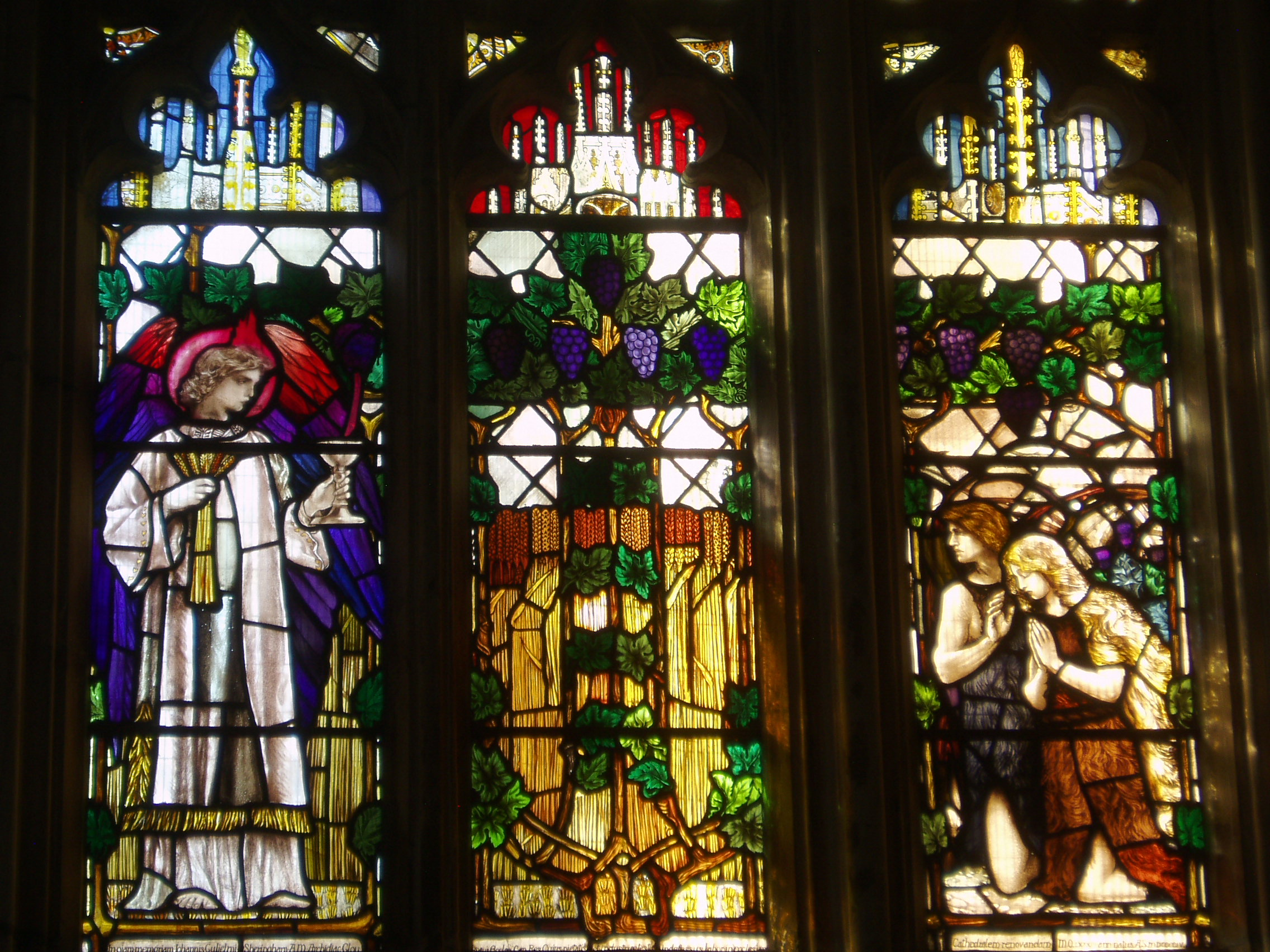
The Restoration in the Sacrament of the Eucharist

The Restoration in the Sacrament of the Eucharist. Window in the Ante-Chapel South. 1902. This three-light window links to the "Man's Fallen State" window opposite and through the death and resurrection of Christ we have gone full circle and man and God are now reconciled. Now Adam and Eve are clothed and kneel as though in contrition and look across at an angel who holds out a chalice in her left hand whilst in her right hand she holds a wheatsheaf. "Man has been restored through the sacrifice of Christ and the Sacrament of the Gospel" is the message and in the centre of his composition Whall depicts wheat stalks and vine leaves (the bread and wine of the Eucharist).

Window was donated in memory of Archdeacon John William Sheringham. When Archdeacon he had raised a large amount of money for the Cathedral's restoration.

== North Nave ==
=== "The Childhood of The Blessed Virgin Mary" ===
Window 1. This being the first large window on the North Nave side of the Lady Chapel. "The Childhood of The Blessed Virgin Mary". 1901

Position in Window I	Image (s) depicted	Comments
The Top Light	Raphael, one of the Archangels	Whall describes Raphael as "the guide of pilgrims and travellers. Material and spiritual". St. Raphael is one of the seven Archangels who stand before the throne of the Lord. Whall depicts him with lantern and staff. He is the leader of the Powers and besides Raphael, Michael and Gabriel are the only Archangels mentioned by name in the Bible. In Hebrew Raphael's name means "God is my Health". This identity came about because of the biblical story which claims that he "healed" the earth when it was defiled by the sins of the fallen angels in the apocryphal book of Enoch. He is also the patron of the blind, of happy meetings, of nurses, of physicians and of travellers. It is Raphael who is traditionally identified as the angel who stirred the healing waters when Jesus healed a paralytic as described in Matthew 9:1-8. (Note: In his windows Whall depicts St Michael, St Gabriel, St Raphael and St Uriel. In "How to read a Church", the other three Archangels are described thus "Jophiel, Chamael and Zadkiel. Christian art sometimes portrays three more archangels, since seven angels were recorded in the Book of Revelation (Revelation 1:20). They have been named Jophiel (or Zophiel), reputed to have been the angel who guarded Eden after Adam and Eve were driven out, and so shown with a flaming sword; Chamael (or Chemuel), who carries a staff and cup since he was meant to have strengthened Jesus during the Agony in the Garden (he is also meant to have wrestled with Jacob); and finally, Zadkiel, who was meant to have appeared to Abraham to stop him sacrificing his son Isaac. He appears with Abraham’s sacrificial knife".)
First tier of five lights and positioned below St Raphael.	The Choir of Virgins (Note: According to "How to read a Church"- "There are nine "choirs" of angels, separated into three orders. The first and highest order is known as the Counsellors, and is made up of three choirs called Seraphim, Cherubim and Thrones. The second order is the Governors (or Rulers), and its choirs are the Dominions, Powers and Virtues. The third order, the Messengers, embraces Principalities, Archangels, and at the bottom of the pile. the Angels.)	Whall explains that lights 1 and 2 depict " The Choir of Virgins (not Angels or one of the Angelic Choirs, but those who share with them in Heaven as in Revelations Chapter 5)". In light 3, the central light, Whall depicts the "Angel of the Narrow Way, showing a path out through the thorns of the world". Light 4 depicts a "Virtue" and light 5 depicts a "Principality".
Second Tier of five lights and positioned below the Choir of Virgins.	Agnes, Lucy, Faith and Agatha. All representing the "Virgin Martyrs" with a depiction of the Childhood of the Blessed Virgin Mary in the centre light.	St. Agnes was only thirteen years old when she suffered martyrdom for her Faith. She had made a vow of chastity and was a beauty whose hand in marriage was vied for by many. To such suitors she would say, "Jesus Christ is my only Spouse." The story was that she refused the marriage proposal of Procop, the Governor's son. He then tried all ways to persuade her to accept his proposal and eventually she was condemned to death. On the day of execution many begged her to save herself. She refused with the words "I would offend my Spouse, if I were to try to please you. He chose me first and He shall have me!" Then she prayed and bowed her head for the death-stroke of the sword. Lucy's name means "light". Legend tells us that Lucy was a Christian martyr during the Diocletian persecution. As with Agnes, Lucy was determined to devote herself to Christ and refused when her mother proposed her marriage to a pagan. In anger the spurned suitor denounced her as a Christian to the governor of Syracuse, Sicily. She was imprisoned and her prison guards we are told were unable to move her or burn her and they ultimately took out her eyes with a fork before she was executed. Lucy is the patroness saint of the blind Faith was another victim of Diocletian persecution of the Christians and she was tortured to death for her Christianity on a red-hot brazier. According to legend Agatha was another who dedicated her life to God and resisted any men who wanted to marry her or have sex with her. One of these men was Quintian who thought he could use his high position to force her to succumb to him. He had her arrested and when his further efforts failed he had her put into a brothel, then moved back to a prison and then tortured. It seems that people prayed to her during the eruption of Mount Etna and she is thus considered a protector against the outbreak of fire. She is also considered the patroness of Bellmakers perhaps because bells were used as fire alarms
Third Tier of five lights	The "Northern Saints". Columba, Aidan, Hilda, Cuthbert and Chad	Columba was probably born in Donegal in Ireland. He studied under St Finnian. Ordained before he was twenty-five, he spent the next fifteen years preaching and setting up foundations at Derry, Durrow, and Kells. A possible family feud got out of hand and in the resultant battle some 3000 people died. As a consequence he was sent into exile and left Ireland and landed on the island of Iona off the coast of Scotland. There he built what was to become a world-famous monastery and helped by the saints Canice and Comgall he spread the gospel to the Picts. He died on Iona. Columba is also known as Colm, Colum and Columcille. Aidan was also born in Ireland before becoming a monk at Iona. At the request of King Oswald of Northumbria, Aidan went to Lindisfarne as bishop. He founded a monastery at Lindisfarne that became known as the English Iona and was a centre for missionary activity for all of northern England. He died in 651 at the royal castle at Bamburgh. Hilda was a Benedictine abbess, the daughter of a Northumbrian king. She spent some time at Chelles Monastery in France but was asked by St Aidan to return to Northumbria. She did so and became the abbess of Hartlepool. Later she became the head of the double monastery of Streaneschalch, at Whitby. Cuthbert is also thought to be Irish though some regard him as a Scot. Orphaned when a young child, he was a shepherd for a time, is thought to have possibly fought against the Mercians and became a monk at Melrose Abbey. A period was spent at Ripon Abbey but Cuthbert then returned to Melrose where he became the Prior and then Prior of Lindisfarne when St Colman and others returned to Ireland after a row over liturgical matters. At Lindisfarne he was said to have attracted huge crowds when preaching. He then asked for permission to live as a hermit until against his will he was elected bishop of Hexham in 685, but arranged with St. Eata to swap Sees, and returned to Lindisfarne where he lived as bishop for the remaining two years of his life. Chad was an Irish archbishop and brother of St. Cedd, also called Ceadda. He was trained by St. Aidan in Lindisfarne and in England. Made the archbishop of York by King Oswy, Chad was disciplined by Theodore, the newly arrived archbishop of Canterbury in 669. Chad accepted Theodore's charges of impropriety with such humility and grace that Theodore regularized his consecration and appointed him the bishop of Mercia. He established a see at Lichfield. In liturgical art he is depicted as a bishop, holding a church.
Fourth and final tier of five lights	Scenes from the lives of the five Saints shown above.	These depict events which are associated with each of these five saints. For St Columba, Whall chose to depict Columba with a stork, reminding us that Columba had to suffer exile from Ireland and would have missed his homeland and for St Aidan, he depicts the shield of the first Church of Wattles on Lindisfarne with the motto "Simile est grano sinapis" / "It is like a grain of mustard seed", thus reminding us that Aidan was to help sow " the seed of Northern Christianity" (mustard was grown on Lindisfarne). For Hilda, Whall depicts St Aidan visiting St. Hilda's school and for Cuthbert we have the motto "Et factus in arborem magnam" /"It becomes a great tree (Gloucester Cathedral)". Finally Whall depicts Chad placing his Bishopric at the disposal of Theodore. The window is in memory of John Dearman Birchall (1828–1897) of Bowden Hall near Gloucester and was given by his son.

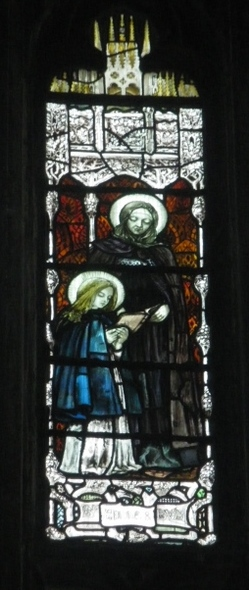
The Childhood of the Blessed Virgin Mary- Mary is shown with her mother who appears to be teaching her to read.

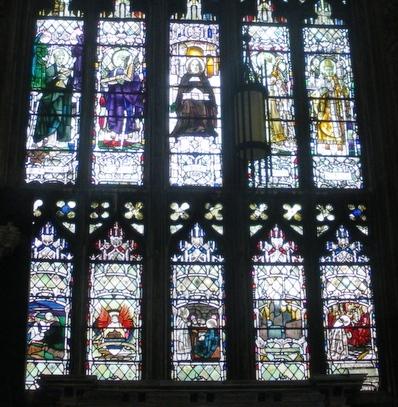
Two tiers of Window I. The five "Northern Saints" and below events associated with them

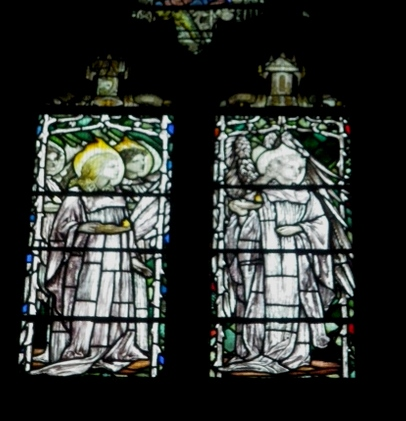
Angels 1 and 2 as depicted in the first tier of five lights

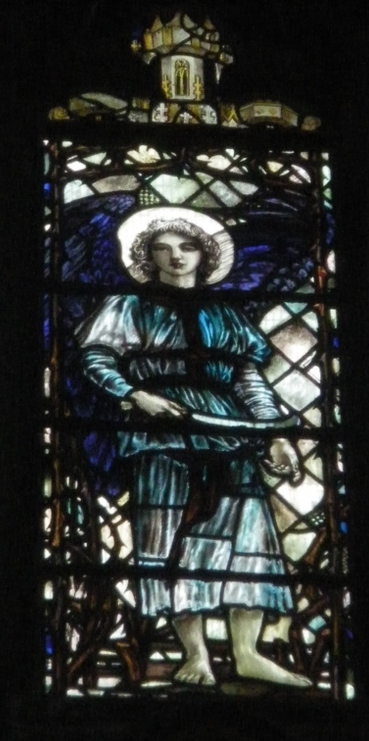
Angel of the Narrow way. She shows a path out through the thorns of the world.

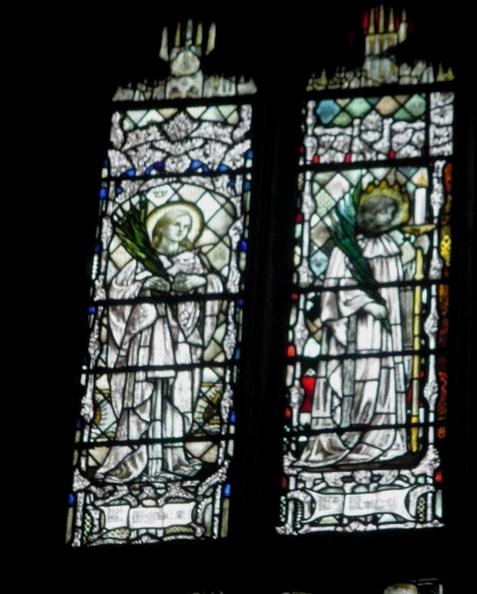
Agnes and Lucy, two of the "Virgin Martyrs".

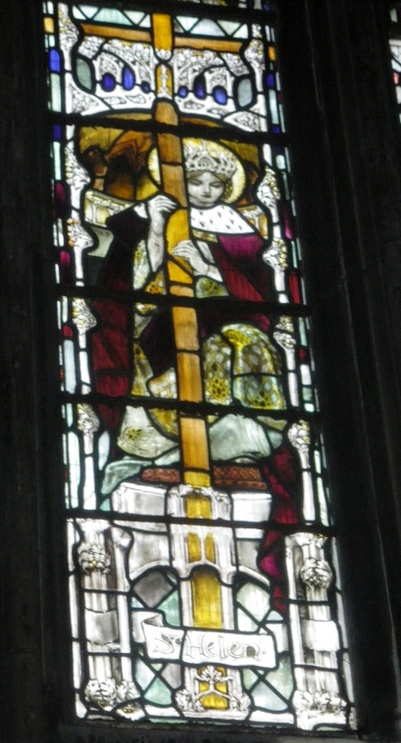
St Helen

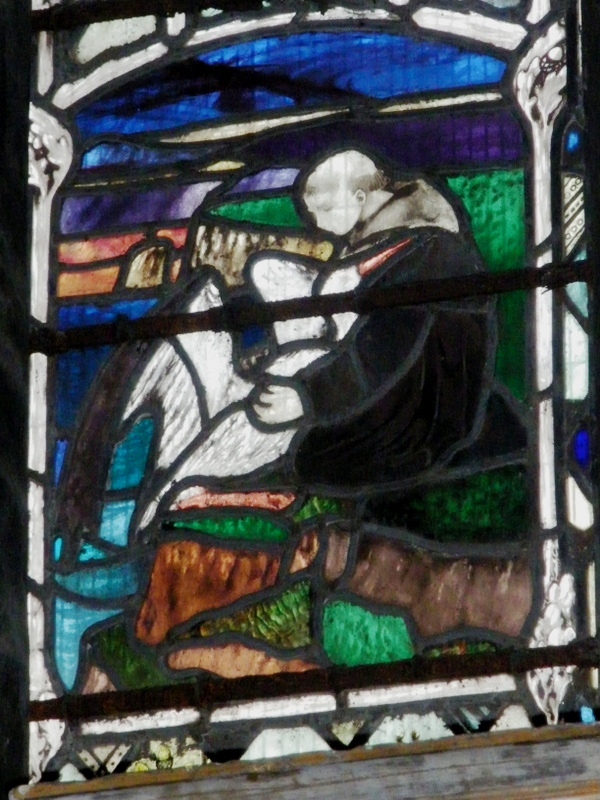
Scene linked to Columba- "The story of the Wandering Stork".

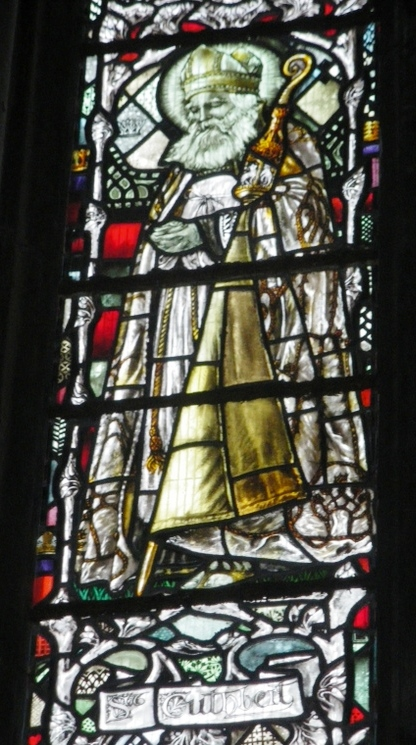
St Cuthbert

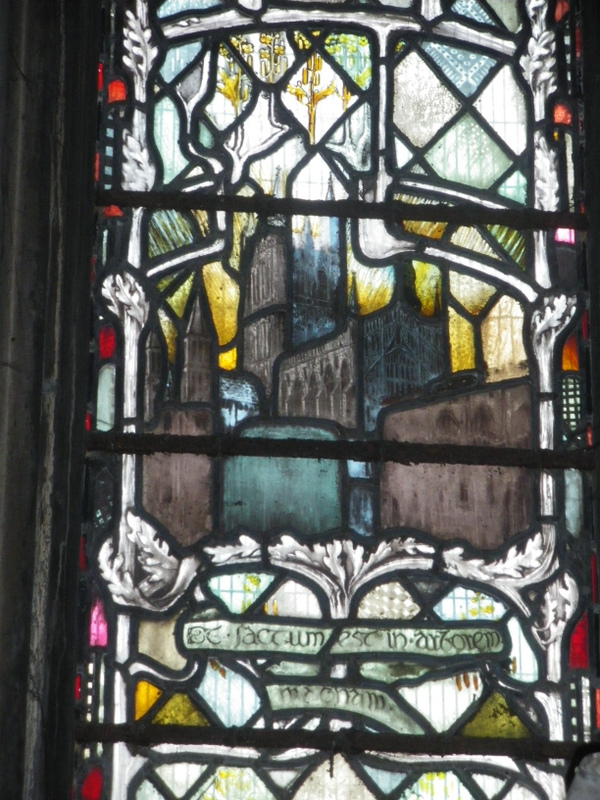
"Et factus in arborem magnam"

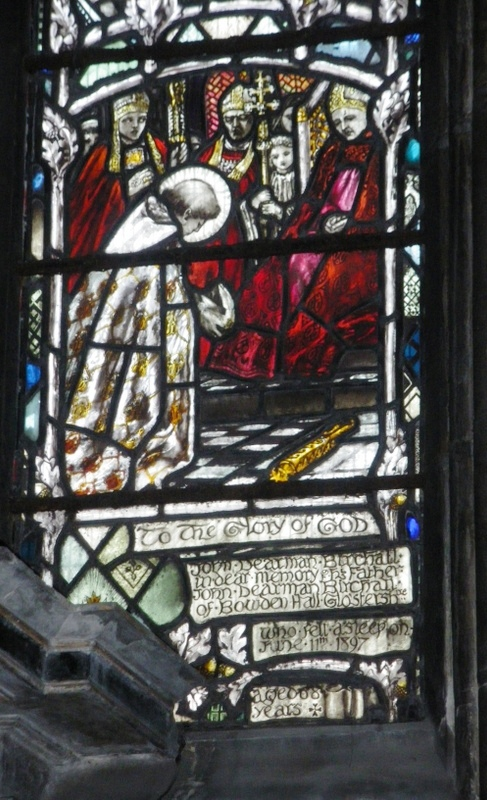
St Chad places his bishopric at the disposal of Theodore.

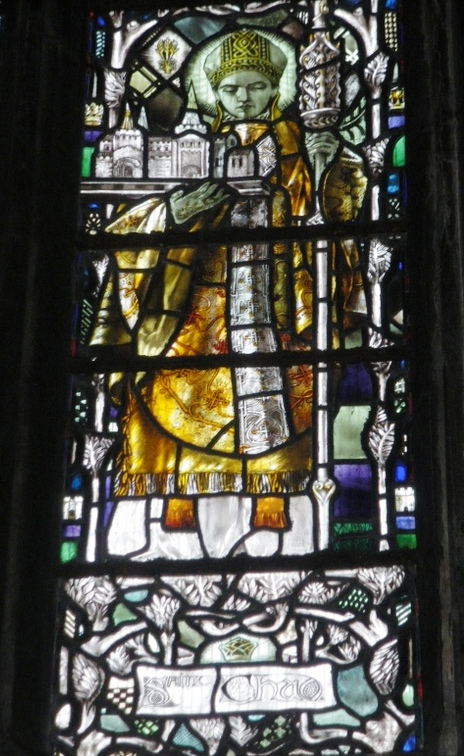
St Chad

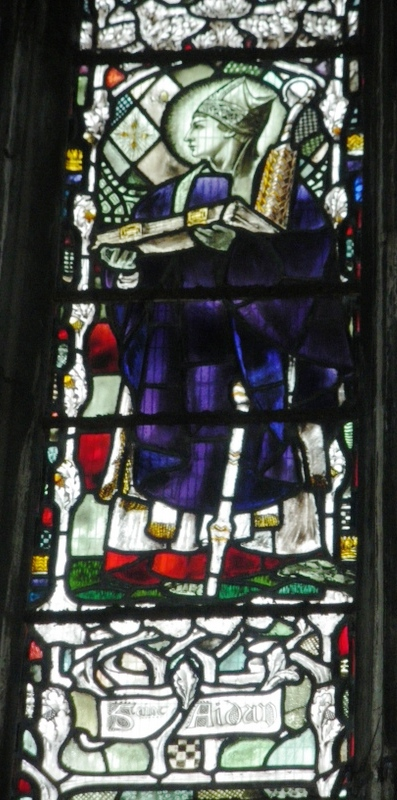
St Aidan.

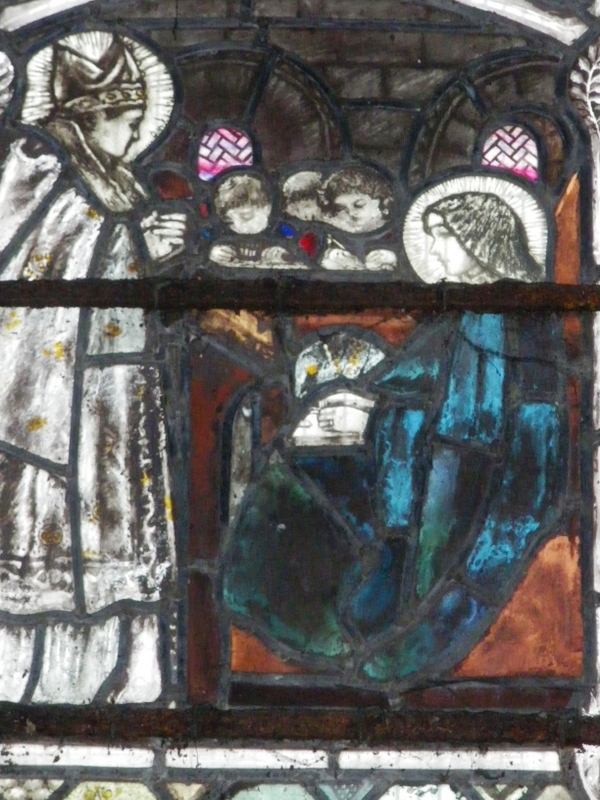
St Aidan visits St Hilda's school.

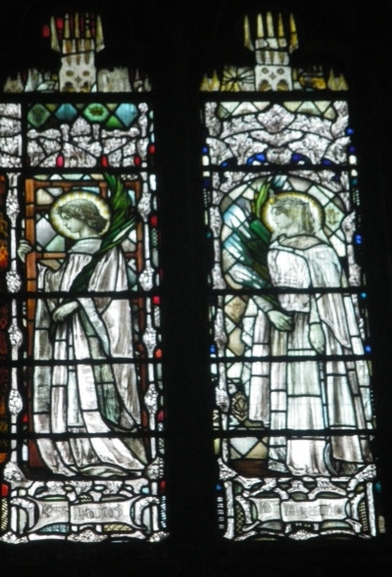
Faith and Agatha, two of the "Virgin Martyrs".

=== "The Annunciation" ===
Window 2. This being the second large window on the North Nave side. "The Annunciation" 1901

Position in Window 2	Image depicted	Comments
The Top Light	Archangel Gabriel	Gabriel's name in Hebrew means "God is my Strength". His main role in the Bible is that of an announcer or messenger. It is Gabriel who appears to Mary in the Annunciation. He also appeared to Zachary in the temple to announce the coming of Zachary's son, John the Baptist and struck Zachary mute for his disbelief. (Luke 1:11-20) and in the Old Testament it was Gabriel who appeared to the Prophet Daniel to explain the meaning of his visions as in Daniel 8:15. He is also designated as the angel who will blow the horn of the Last Judgement which is why a trumpet is often a Gabriel attribute. With his role as a messenger in mind it is of no surprise that he should be the patron saint of post office and telephone workers.
In the range of five lights below Gabriel	"Scales and Thrones"	Whall explains that lights 1 and 2 depict "Thrones", light 3 depicts "Gloria in Excelsis" and lights 4 and 5 also depict "Thrones". The "Thrones" in the scheme of Angels are "Counsellers" of the Deity and either bear scales of judgement or thrones of dominion. In Whall's five lights the scales are gradually supersed by thrones. Firstly we have scales only, then scales and a throne are equal, then the Throne is predominant, then we have the Throne only and in the fifth light "The kingdoms of this world are become" etc. (Note: Presumably Whall is referring to Revelation 11:15- " The seventh angel sounded his trumpet, and there were loud voices in heaven, which said:"The kingdom of the world has become the kingdom of our Lord and of his Messiah, and he will reign for ever and ever)
Second Tier of five-lights below "Scales and Thrones"	Whall depicts The Baptist, the Annunciation in lights 2, 3 and 4 and Catherine in the fifth and final light	John the Baptist was the son of Zachary and Elizabeth, a relative of the Virgin Mary. He had lived as a hermit for several years and when he was about thirty he began preaching on the banks of the Jordan calling men to penance and baptism "for the Kingdom of Heaven is close at hand". When Christ came to him he recognised Him as the Messiah and baptized Him, saying, "It is I who need baptism from You". Herod Antipas, Tetrarch of Perea and Galilee, who feared John's influence, had him arrested and imprisoned at Machaerus Fortress on the Dead Sea and when John denounced Herod's marriage with Herodias, wife of his half brother Philip, he was beheaded at the request of Salome, daughter of Herodias. Catherine was persecuted by Maximinus who ordered that she be broken on the wheel but when she touched it the wheel was destroyed. She was then beheaded. It was because of Catherine's reputation for learning that she is the patroness saint of librarians, teachers and archivists.
Third Tier of five-lights below the Annunciation	Whall now depicts a further group of saints, Patrick, Bede, Helen, Bridget and David of Wales.	Patrick, although born near Dumbarton was to become the patron saint of Ireland. His parents were Calpurnius and Conchessa who were Roman administrators living in Britain. When a young boy, he was captured by a raiding party and taken to Ireland as a slave and put to work tending sheep. During this time he found God and subsequently escaped and managed to get back to Scotland. It was then that legend has it that he had a dream in which the people of Ireland were calling out to him "We beg you, holy youth, to come and walk among us once more." He began his studies for the priesthood and was ordained by St. Germanus, the Bishop of Auxerre and was sent to take the Gospel to Ireland. Patrick began preaching the Gospel throughout Ireland and did so for many years and until his death Bede spent his whole life in a monastery devoting himself to the study of scripture and to teaching and writing. He is considered one of the most learned men of his time and a major influence on English literature. His best-known work is HISTORIA ECCLESIASTICA, a history of the English Church and people, which he completed in 731. He was called "the Venerable" to acknowledge his wisdom and learning. Helen was a British princess who married a Roman General, Constantius Chlorus, and became the mother of Constantine the Great. In her embracing of Christianity she much influenced Constantine who was to become the first Christian emperor. In her eightieth year she made a famous pilgrimage to Jerusalem, with the ardent desire of discovering the cross on which our Blessed Redeemer had suffered. Three crosses were found on Mount Calvary, together with the names and the inscription recorded by the Evangelists. The miraculous discovery and verification of the true Cross is still celebrated by the Church on 3 May. She also built a beautiful Basilica on Mount Calvary to receive these precious relics, sending portions of it also to Rome and Constantinople. She built two other famous churches in Palestine to honour the sacred sites of Our Lord's life, one at the site of His Ascension, and the other, known as the Basilica of the Nativity, in Bethlehem. Bridget had arrived in Ireland a few years after St. Patrick. As she grew up she became exceedingly pious and when her parents' thoughts turned to marriage she would not think of marrying anyone in view of her dedication to God. She learned that her beauty was the reason for the attentions of so many young men so she prayed fervently to God to take her good looks from her. God granted her wish and seeing that his daughter was no longer pretty, her father agreed when she asked to become a Nun and it was when she was consecrated that a miracle happened and her good looks returned. St. David was the son of King Sant of South Wales and St. Non. He was ordained a priest and later studied under St. Paulinus. He was much involved in missionary work and founded a number of monasteries. He is revered as the patron saint of Wales.
Final tier of five lights below the above saints.	Whall paints five little vignettes in the final row at the base of the window	These depict St Patrick being taught by St Germanus, Bede dictating the last lines of his translation of the Bible, the showing of the true cross to a dying man ( when the three Crosses were discovered buried on Mount Calvery they were tried on a dying man and when the "True Cross" was shown to him he recovered) and finally we see St Bridget's " Double Community" (Monks & Nuns). In Whall's notes he implies that the inscription ("Write quickly"- He died as the last verse was written) would be added to the St Bede panel but it is not there or has perhaps faded with the passage of time. One should also note that the vignette of St Bridget's "Double Community" is not seen in full owing to the shape of the window at the bottom right hand side. There is no vignette linked to David.

The window was given by Baron de Ferrieres of Cheltenham. The inscription reads "Erected to the glory of God for the beautifying of His House in heartfelt gratitude for 75 years of continued and undeserved mercies".

Notice the little stained glass windows in the lower lights, a window within a window. Also note in bottom right hand corner by the dedication a small jug, a compass and carpenter's square with the initials P G-D, K T. R and S, these being of students and workmen who helped with the painting and fixing.

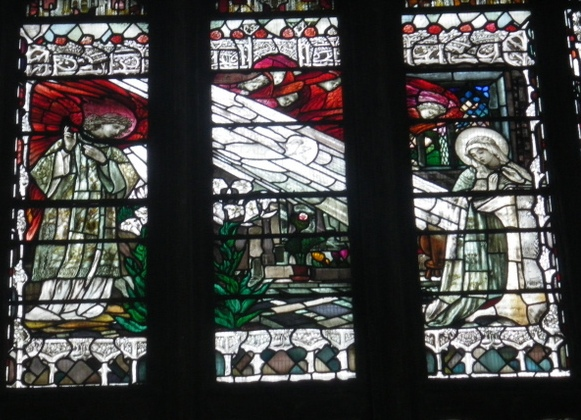
The Annunciation-Gabriel brings Mary "Great News"

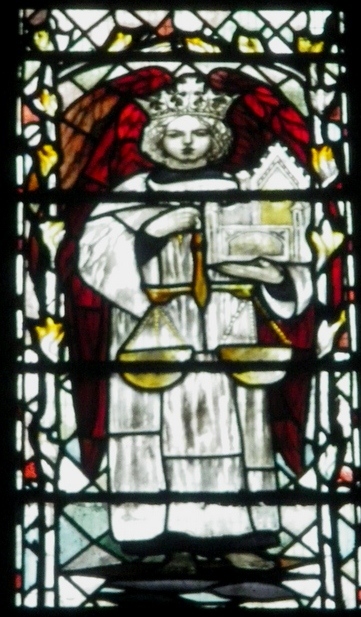
An angel with both scales and throne

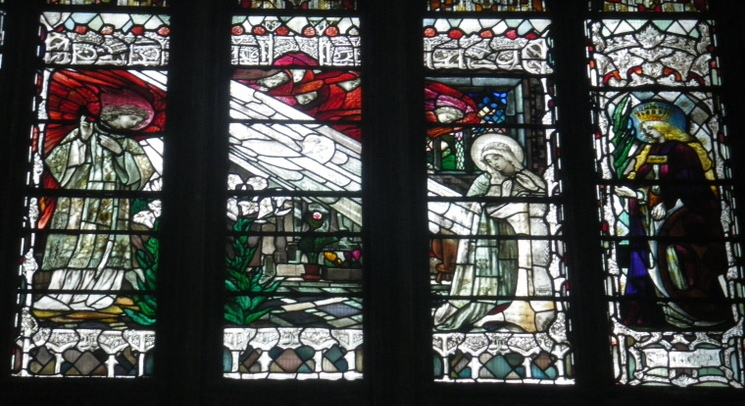
St Catherine depicted to the right of the Annunciation scene

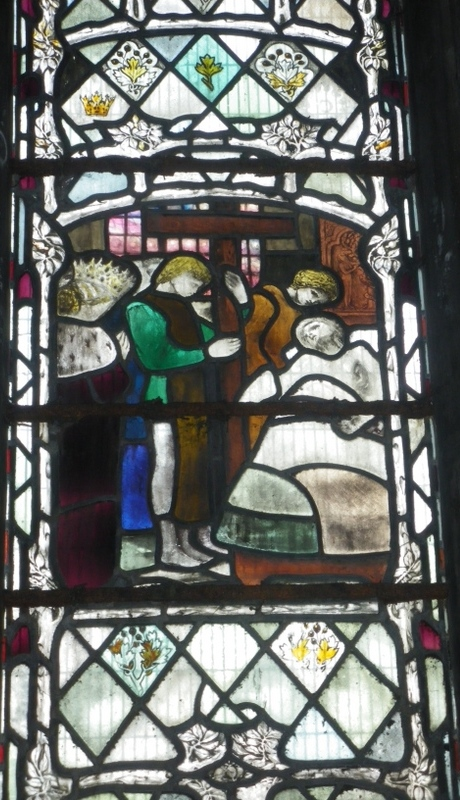
The "True Cross" is shown to a dying man

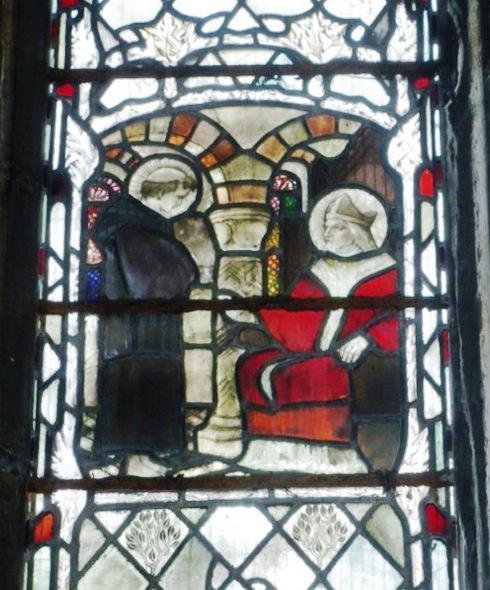
St Patrick is taught by St Germanus

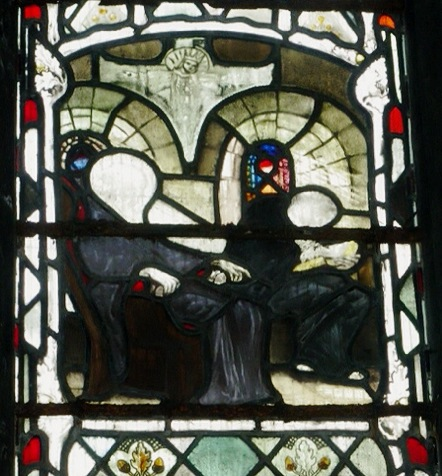
St Bede shown dictating his translation of the Bible to a scribe

=== "The Salutation" ===
Window 3. This being the first large window on the South Nave side. "The Salutation". 1902

Position in Window 3	Image depicted	Comments
The Top Light.	Uriel, one of the Archangels.	Whall describes Uriel as "the Angel of the Sun, and so of Natural Creation". Uriel, whose name means in Hebrew "God is my light" is traditionally the leader of the Seraphim, and the angel who was guarding the sepulchre of Jesus after the Resurrection. In the First Book of Enoch it was Uriel who provided astrological data to Enoch and also appeared to Noah to warn him of the coming floods
First tier of five lights and positioned below Uriel.	"Power, Music, Creation, Earth and Fire. "	Whall explains that he is depicting "Power, then Music, the Angel of creation bearing a scroll "Coeli enarrant" etc. Next come Earth and Fire." "Coeli enarrant" comes from Psalm 18. (Note: Coeli enarrant gloriam Dei et opera manuum eius adnuntiat firmamentum-The heavens shew forth the glory of God, and the firmament declareth the work of his hands." See http://www.medievalist.net/psalmstxt/ps18.htm)
Second tier of five lights	Whall depicts the "Salutation" (Note: Normally understood to refer to the time when Mary visited Elizabeth. Luke 1.41-45. "And when Elizabeth heard Mary’s greeting, the baby stirred in her womb. Then Elizabeth was filled with the Holy Spirit and cried aloud, "God’s blessing is on you above all women, and his blessing is on the fruit of your womb. Who am I, that the mother of my Lord should visit me? I tell you, when your greeting sounded in my ears, the baby in my womb leapt for joy. How happy is she who has had faith that the Lord’s promise would be fulfilled!") with accompanying saints and martyrs. Vincent and Alban are on the left hand side and George and Lawrence are on the right hand side.	Vincent suffered martyrdom under Diocletian. Born in Saragossa. Studied under Valerius, the Bishop of Saragossa. By order of the Governor Dacian, he and Valerius were arrested. Valerius was banished but Vincent suffered dreadful tortures and died in prison. St Alban was the first martyr of England. It is written that during the persecution of Christians, Alban, though a pagan, hid a priest. This priest made a great impression on Alban and he converted to Christianity. Soldiers were sent to take the priest prisoner but Alban passed himself off as the priest and it was he who was taken to prison. When his subterfuge was discovered, the judge who had ordered the arrest was furious and in spite of extreme pressure on Alban to deny his new religion he refused and was ultimately beheaded. George was a soldier in the army of the Roman Emperor Diocletian, and he was one of the Emperor's favourite soldiers. Diocletian was a pagan and had put to death every Christian he could find. George was in fact a Christian and took Diocletian to task for his cruelty. He resigned from the Roman army and for this he was tortured and finally beheaded Lawrence suffered from Valerian's persecution of Christians especially when Valerian ordered that all bishops, priests and deacons should be put to death. Lawrence was a deacon and a victim of Valerian's purge. According to most scholars Lawrence was burned to death on a gridiron
Third tier of five lights	Saints from the Midlands and the South, Etheldreda, Swithun, Edward, Oswald and Frideswide.	Etheldreda was a Benedictine abbess. She was married to Tonbert, prince of the Gryvii tribe, but he allowed her to remain a virgin. When he died after three years, she entered religious life under St. Ebba at Coldingham, England, and then became abbess of the monastery in Ely. Married once more, this time to a local king, she nevertheless remained a virgin and soon returned to the religious life. She is depicted in liturgical art as an abbess, with a crozier, book, rod, or lily Swithun was born in Wessex, England and was educated at the old monastery in Winchester, where he was ordained. He became chaplain to King Egbert of the West Saxons, who appointed him tutor of his son, Ethelwulf, and was one of the King's counselors. Swithun was named bishop of Winchester in 852 when Ethelwulf succeeded his father as king Edward or Edward the Confessor's reign as King of England was a peaceful one characterized by his good rule and remission of unfair taxes but it also saw the struggle, partly caused by his natural inclination to favor the Normans, between Godwin and his Saxon supporters and the Norman barons, including Robert of Jumieges, whom Edward had brought with him when he returned to England and whom he named Archbishop of Canterbury in 1051. In the same year, Edward banished Godwin, who took refuge in Flanders but returned the following year with a fleet ready to lead a rebellion. Armed revolt was avoided when the two men met and settled their differences; among them was who would be the Archbishop of Canterbury, which was resolved when Edward replaced Robert with Stigand, and Robert returned to Normandy. Edward's difficulties continued after Godwin's death in 1053 with Godwin's two sons: Harold who had his eye on the throne since Edward was childless, and Tostig, Earl of Northumbria. Tostig was driven from Northumbria by a revolt in 1065 and banished to Europe by Edward, who named Harold his successor. After this Edward became more interested in religious affairs and built St. Peter's Abbey at Westminster, the site of the present Abbey, where he is buried Oswald was the King of Northumbria . He was the son of Æthelfrith of Bernicia and came to rule after spending a period in exile. After defeating the British ruler Cadwallon ap Cadfan, Oswald brought the two Northumbrian kingdoms of Bernicia and Deira once again under a single ruler, and promoted the spread of Christianity in Northumbria. He was given a strongly positive assessment by the historian Bede, writing a little less than a century after Oswald's death, who regarded Oswald as a saintly king; it is also Bede who is the main source for present-day historical knowledge of Oswald. After eight years of rule, in which he was the most powerful ruler in Britain. Oswald was killed in the Battle of Maserfield Frideswide was a Benedictine hermitess and nun, the daughter of Prince Didan of the Upper Thames region of England. She is sometimes called Fredeswinda. When Prince Aelfgar of a neighbouring kingdom asked for her hand in marriage, Frideswide fled to Thomwry Wood in Birnsey, where she became a hermitess. She subsequently founded the St. Mary's Convent in Oxford and is patroness of the university of that city.
Final tier of five lights	Scenes from the lives of the above saints.	In the panels at the bottom of this window Whall depicts the Ash Tree of St Etheldreda, (Note: It is said that on her journey to Ely, she rested at Stow, and planted her staff in the ground, whereupon it grew into an Ash Tree under which she was able to shelter.) then we see St Swithun consecrating a bridge at Winchester which he had had built. (Note: Swithun’s best known miracle was his restoration of a bridge on a basket of eggs that workmen had maliciously broken) Whall then depicts Edward being shown the treasury of the "Danegelt" the result of grinding taxation. He sees the Devil seated on the gold and remits the tax. Next we have the death of Oswald in battle "O God Save their Souls" says the motto and finally we have Frideswide fleeing her lover and hiding in a pigsty. (Note: When she was fleeing Aelfgar who had tried to consummate their marriage she was said to have hidden in a pig-sty. http://www.britannia.com/history/legend/berks/frideswide01 .htm l)

A note in the glass points out that this is one of four windows inserted 1900–02 when Dr. Spence was dean.

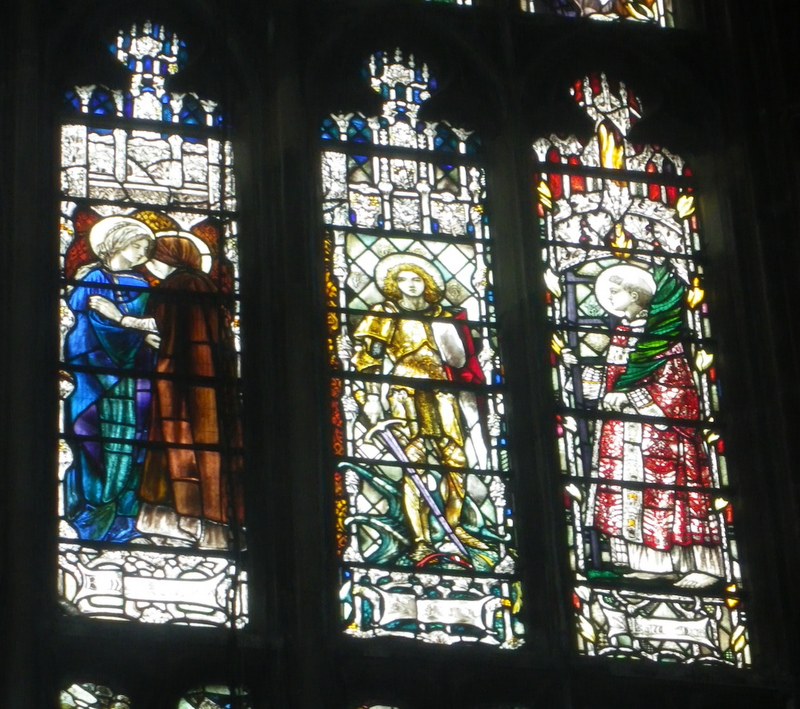
The Salutation with two martyrs, St George and St Lawrence to the right

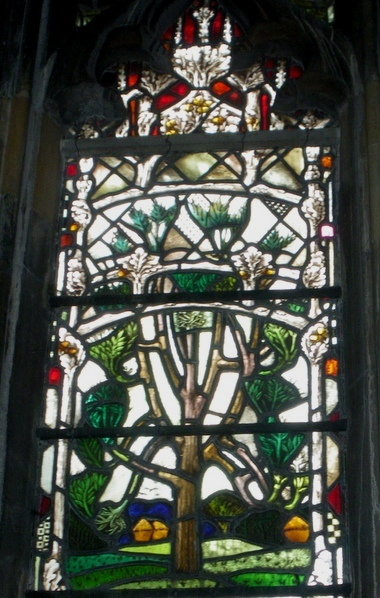
Etheldreda's Ash Tree

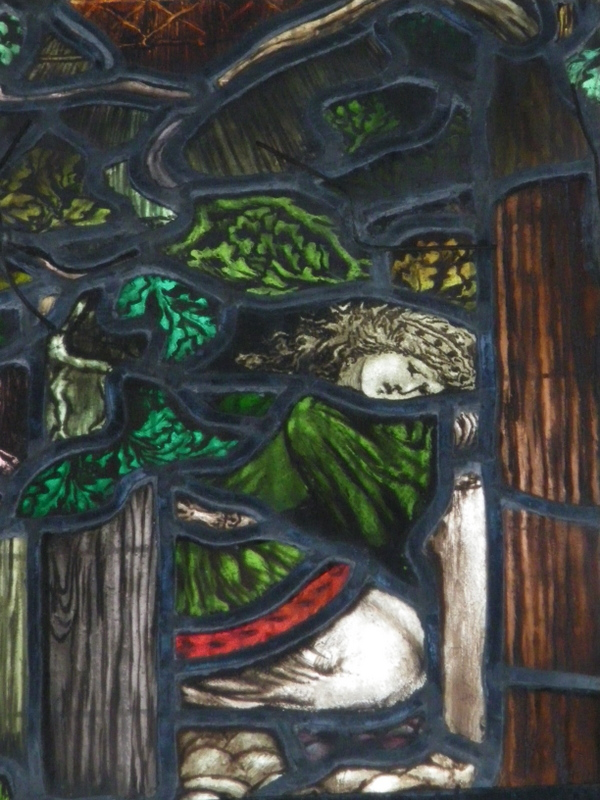
Frideswide hides away in a Pig-Sty

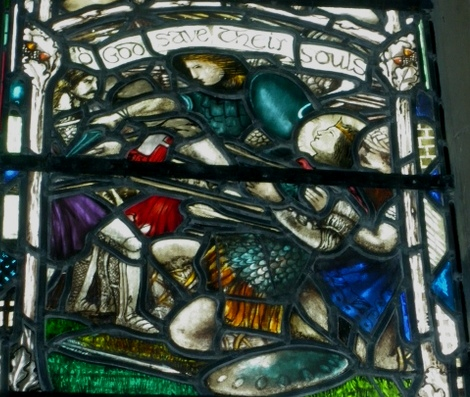
St Oswald shown having been killed in the Battle of Maserfield.

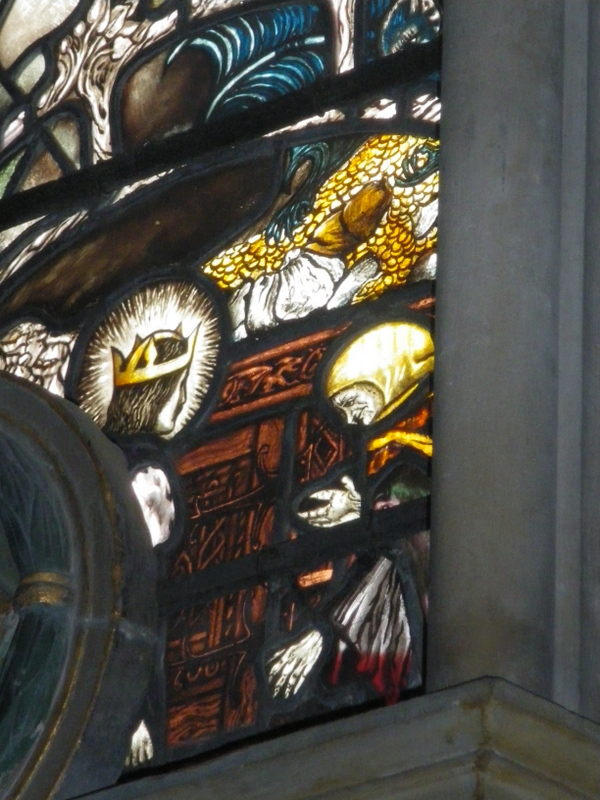
Edward and the "Danegelt" a tax he was to abolish. Satan sits gloating over a hoard of coins.

=== "The Nativity" ===
Window 4. This is the second large window on the south nave side. "The Nativity". 1909

Position in Window 4	Image depicted	Comments
The Top Light.	Whall depicts Michael	Michael is the leader of the Archangels, and his name in Hebrew "Who is like God". Michael is sometimes portrayed holding scales to weigh souls in images of the Last Judgement.
First tier of five lights and positioned below Michael	"Swords and Sceptres". The Choir of Dominations.The gradual passing of violence into war.	"In the first row of five lights we see a sword only, then a sceptre and sword equal, next the Angel of the Resurrection, then the sceptre predominant. Next we see the sceptre only as laid down at the breaking of the final morning and the new Heaven and Earth. ".
Second tier of five lights	Whall depicts Mary Magdalen in the first light and in lights 2, 3 and 4 the Nativity with Stephen in the final light.	Whall's depiction of the Nativity here is very similar to his composition in Holy Trinity, Sloane Square.
Third tier of five lights	Whall depicts the saints Eadburg, Hugh, Edmund, Boniface and Winifred (For some reason Whall has excluded Winifred from his notes)	In the following row Whall depicts Eadburg who holds a chalice in her hands. He would in fact be referring to St Edburga, who was the daughter of King Edward the Elder by his third marriage to Lady Edith of Kent. She was the full younger sister of both Kings Edmund the Magnificent and Edred. The story is told that at the age of only three she was offered the choice of a small chalice and paten or gold and jewelry. The little girl eagerly took up the chalice and paten and this convinced her father of her ultimate vocation. She was soon placed under the guidance of Abbess Ethelthritha of the Nunnaminster Monastery in Winchester, whose community received endowments and gifts from the grateful king. St. Edburga became revered for her holiness even within her own lifetime. She was loved by all her contemporaries for her gentleness and humility. Hugh was a Carthusian bishop and missionary to England. Born in Avalon Castle in Burgundy, France, the son of William, Lord of Burgundy. Hugh was raised by monks at Villard Benoit after his mother died when he was eight. While groomed to enter the Augustinian Canons, he was instead drawn to the contemplative life and became a Carthusian in 1160, while visiting the Grande Chartreuse. In 1175, he was invited by King Henry II to found the first English Charterhouse of the Order at Witham, in Somerset. This foundation was part of the King's penances for the murder of St. Thomas Becket. Hugh then became bishop of Lincoln in 1181 at the command of the King, accepting the office only after he was duly and freely elected. Renowned for his goodness and deep learning, Hugh disagreed with Henry and King Richard the Lionhearted on many occasions, but he never lost their respect nor ceased attempting to wield his saintly influence for the good of the Church and the English people. He was also a fervent defender of the English Jews, protecting them from armed mobs. At his funeral, his bier was carried by notables, including the kings of England and Scotland. Hugh died in Lincoln on 16 November, after a journey to France, and his tomb was a popular pilgrim site until its despoilment at the command of King Henry VIII in the sixteenth century In his notes and the reference to Boniface, Whall refers us to his book on stained glass in particular Plate XI and pages 224-5 and the subject of "Staining" . The final saint is Winifred and in his depiction of her Whall includes the line of severance on her neck where she was beheaded and at the base water springing up on the site of her martyrdom.
Final tier of five lights	Scenes from the lives of the above saints.	Whall depicts one of St Hugh's Monks carving the Angel Choir at Lincoln and gives us an extract from Bishop Frodsham's Book A Bishop’s Pleasaunce . See note. (Note: "There is a belated pane, formed by the stonework of a doorway, in one of the windows in the Lady Chapel of Gloucester Cathedral that expresses this idea (the thought of the unknown artists and craftsmen whose labour remains behind them). The demi-figure of a monk is displayed in the habit of a rough craftsman, chiselling at a stone representation of an Angel’s wing. The wing stretches out, grey and beautiful, across the lower field of the picture. The Monk is busy, so busy that one almost hears him singing at his work, but his face is hidden. He sees his work only. In doing so he is a type of the many unknown artists whose finished work delights us") Next we see Edmund and Abbot Samson uncovering the body of St Edmund- For a full description Whall refers us to Carlyle's "Past & Present". Chapter XV1 ."St Edmund". Whall also comments that the altar lights on this subject form a good example of the use of "yellow stain" and points us to pages 70 and 129 of his book. We then see Boniface cutting down the heathen oak of Friesland and disturbing the "Purple Emperor" butterflies, (Note: A reading of Whall’s autobiographical notes covering his childhood, held at the National Art Library will show his knowledge of and love of butterflies) which inhabit the oak tree. (Note: "Boniface returned to Upper Hessia and repaired the losses which occurred during his absence, many having drifted back into paganism; he also administered everywhere the Sacrament of Confirmation. He continued his work in Lower Hessia. To show the heathens how utterly powerless were the gods in whom they placed their confidence, Boniface felled the oak sacred to the thunder-god Thor, at Geismar, near Fritzlar. He had a chapel built out of the wood and dedicated it to the prince of the Apostles. The heathens were astonished that no thunderbolt from the hand of Thor destroyed the offender, and many were converted. The fall of this oak marked the fall of heathenism" extract from https://www.newadvent.org/cathen/02656a.htm) and finally "The choice of Eadburg" . Whall depicts her turning away from the jewels & Toga and choosing the Chalice and Missal.

This window was given by William Long J.P.of Gloucester in memory of his wife Anne.

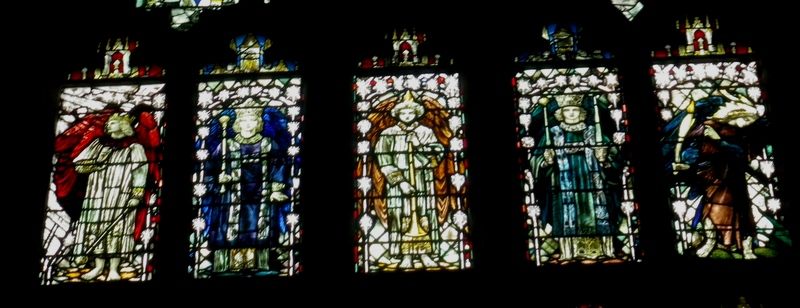
"Swords and Sceptres"

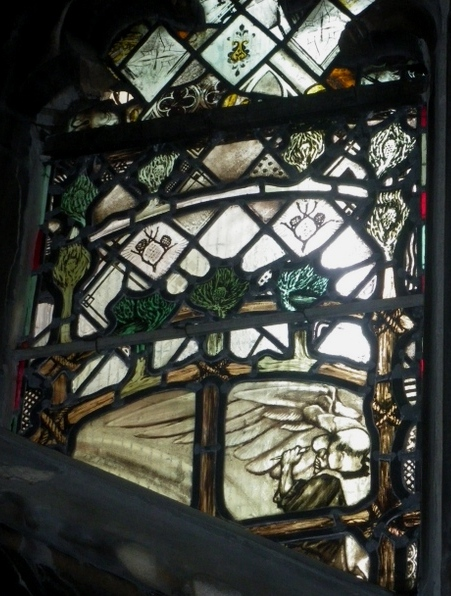
A monk carving for the Angel Choir at Lincoln. A reference to St Hugh.

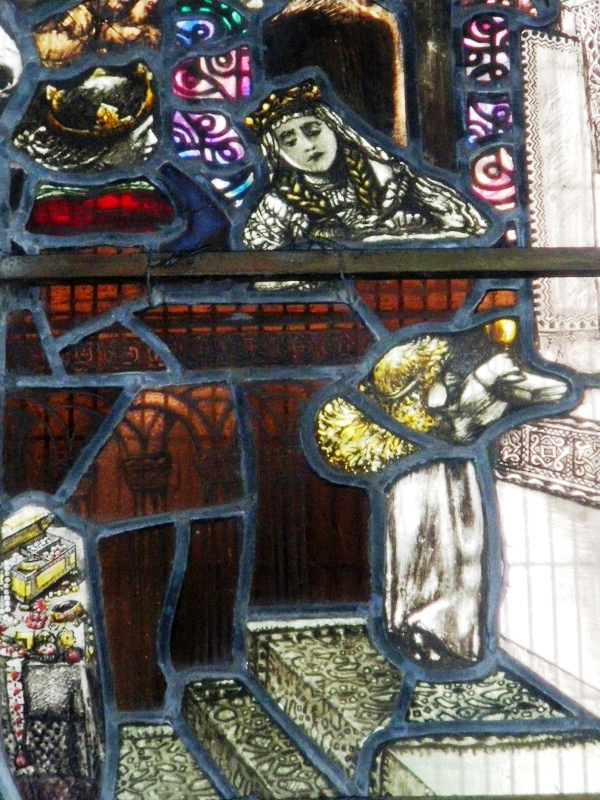
The tiny figure of Eadburg makes her choice

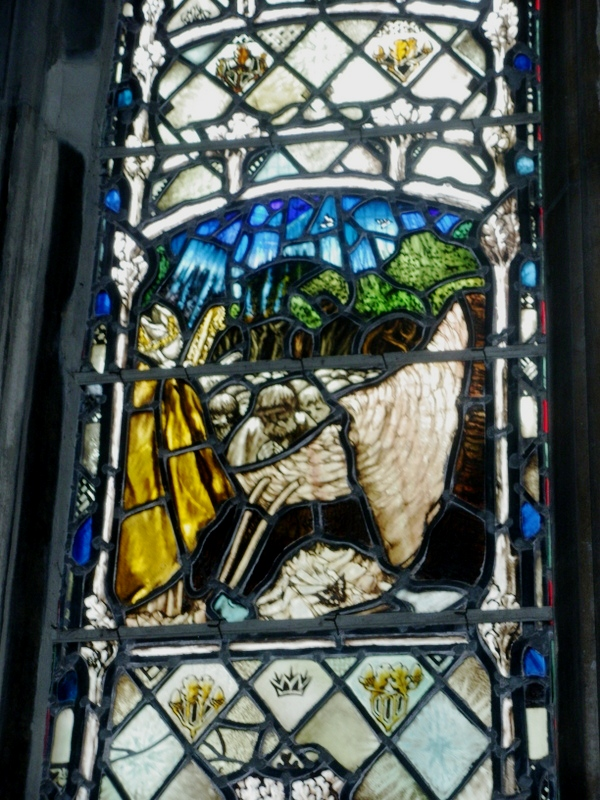
Boniface cuts down the sacred "heathen" oak.

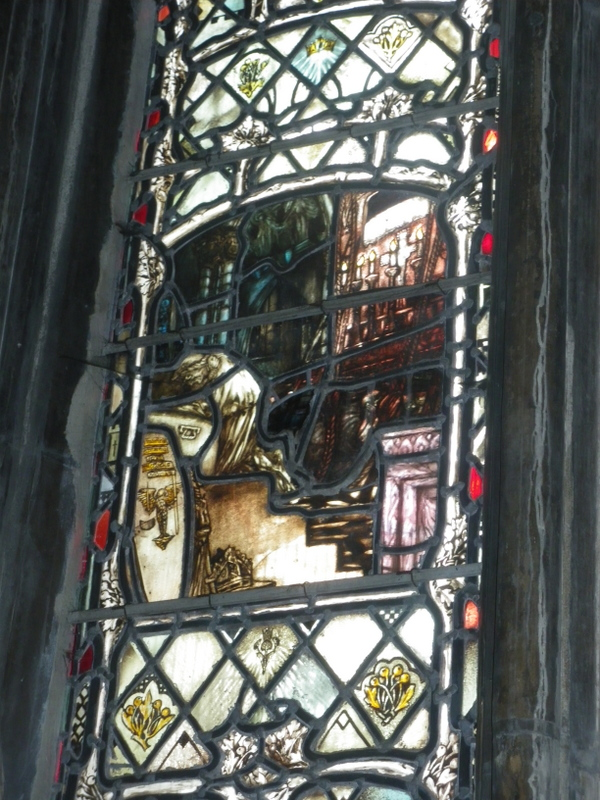
St Edmund's body is discovered.

=== "The Reconciliation of Man to God through the Incarnation" ===
Window 5.This being the large window on the North side of the Chancel. "The Reconciliation of Man to God through the Incarnation".1909

Position in Window 5	Image depicted	Comments
The Top Light.	An Angel	Whall paints the angel with Purple wings combining the colours of the Choir of Seraphim below (red) and that of the Cherubim (blue)
First tier of five lights and positioned below the Angel with purple wings.	Seraphim and Cherubim	Whall depicts " the Angels of Love taking precedence over those of Wisdom and being on the Gospel side ".
Second tier of five lights	"The Reconciliation of Man to God through the Incarnation"	In the central light Christ is shown enthroned amidst the seven candle-sticks. The Blessed Virgin Mary is shown in the light to His left and the Magdalen in the light to His right. Adam and Eve are in the outside light clothed in heavenly raiment, but with an inner garment of skins, and the outer one with a diaper ornament of fig leaves.
Third tier of five lights	Saints Peter and Paul with St John, St James and St Andrew.	Whall points out that the Cathedral (Gloucester) is dedicated to Saints Peter and Paul and that St Andrew has with him a "lad" carrying loaves and fishes.
Final tier of five lights	Scenes from the live of the Blessed Virgin Mary.	Whall depicts the Annunciation, The Visitation, the Nativity, the Presentation and Finding in the Temple.

This window was given in memory of Charles James Monk (1824–1900) by his daughters. In the bottom right-hand corner of the window are Monk's Arms and the motto "Fortifier, Fideliter. Feliciter". Monk was an M.P.for Gloucester, Chancellor of Bristol diocese from 1855 and of Gloucester diocese from 1859. His father James Henry Monk was Bishop of Gloucester 1830-1836 and of Gloucester and Bristol until his death in 1856.

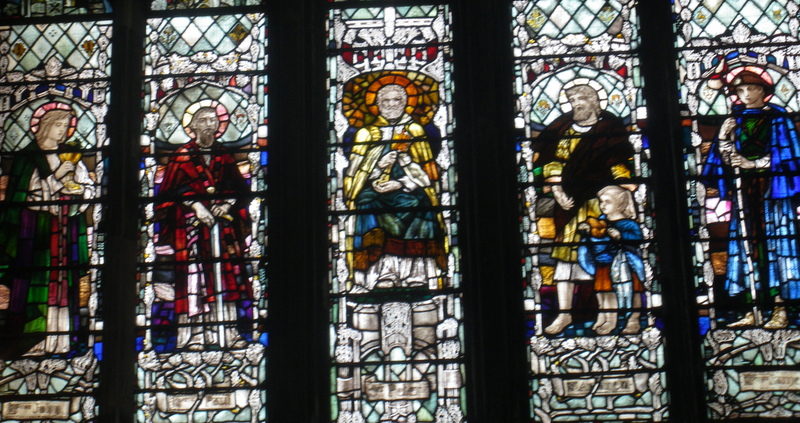
The Third tier down of window 5.

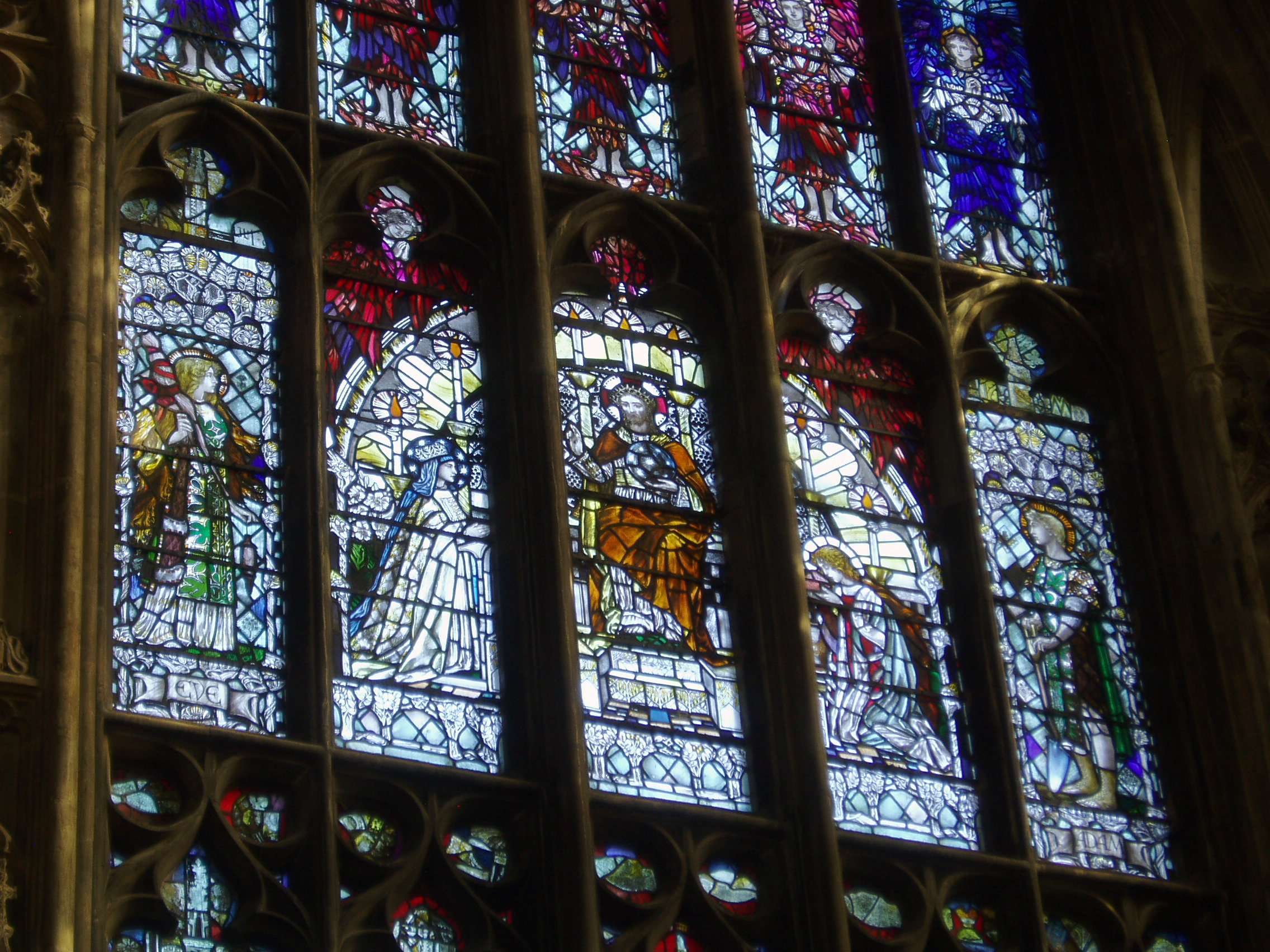
"Christ Enthroned"

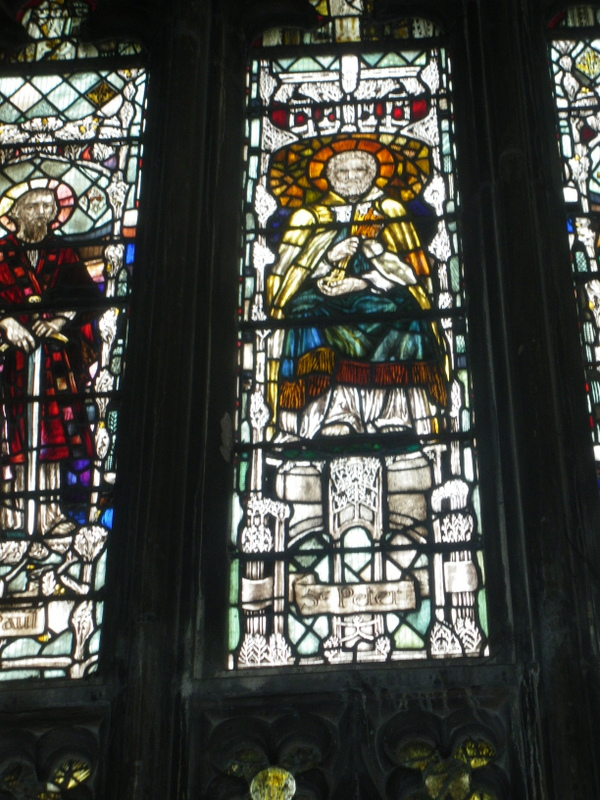
St Peter

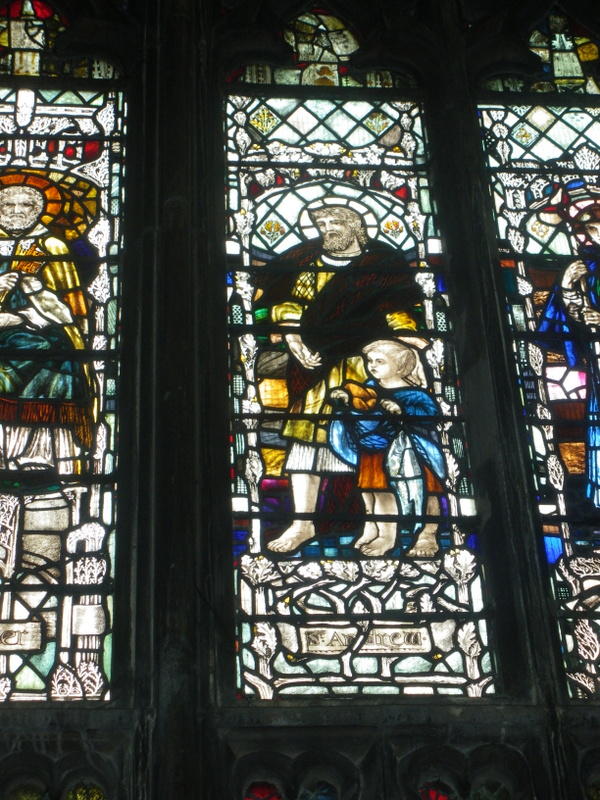
St Andrew with "lad"

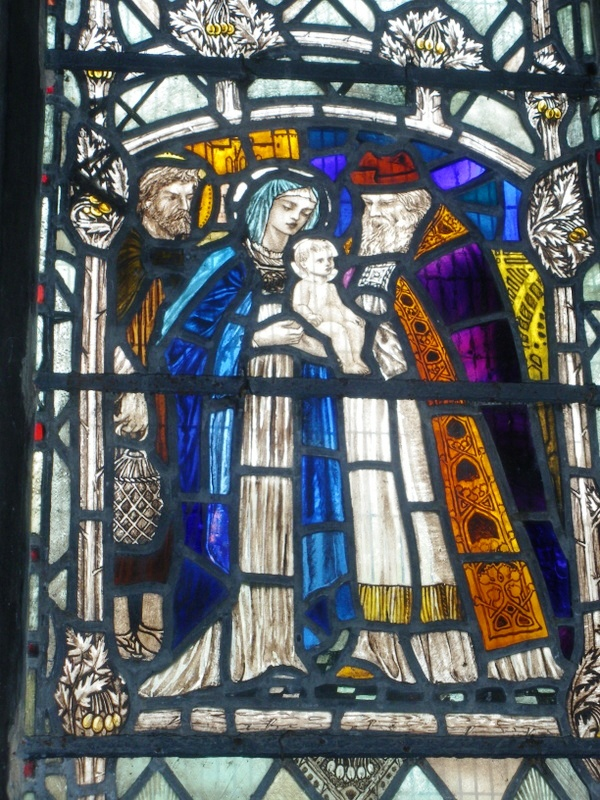
The Presentation

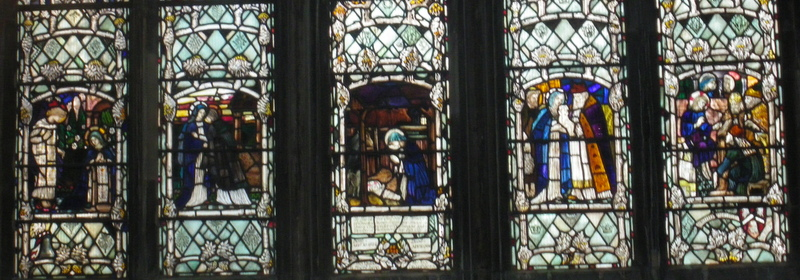
Scenes from the life of Mary.

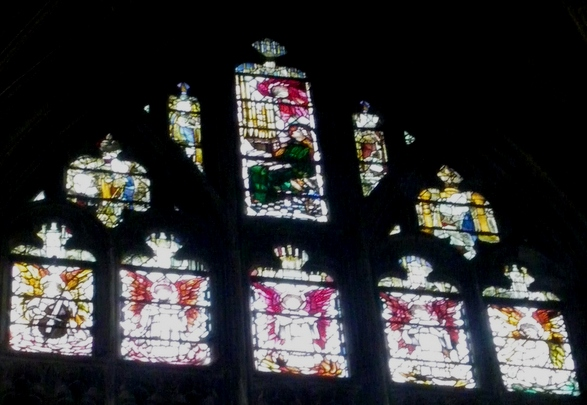
The window in memory of Sir John Dorington- angels in lower lights designed by Veronica Whall

== South African War Memorial Window, Chapterhouse ==
Another of Whall's works in Gloucester Cathedral is the magnificent South African War Memorial window, the Great East Window in the Chapter House. Concerning this window, Whall points out that there is a full description available on a notice board just by the window and he reminds us that the Chapter House was the building in which the Domesday Book was compiled and points out that the lower centre lights of the window represent William the Conqueror directing the compilation of the Book. He asks us to notice the map hanging over the edge of the table and says that with the help of opera glasses the ancient names of the towns may be read.

The window comprises 18 lights with seven tracery lights above. It is divided into three groups of six lights each, each group having an upper tier of three and a lower tier of three. Whall explains that he intends the window to depict the "Spirit of the Lord" (Isaiah xi, 2), divided into the two great branches- COUNSEL and MIGHT.

Position in South African War Memorial Window	Image (s) depicted	Comments
The three central upper lights	"COUNSEL IN THINGS SACRED"	Whall depicts Osric, the King of Northumbria. A.D.729 (founder of the Abbey as an act of penance) with the Saints Peter and Paul on either side. The three lights are drawn together by the drawing of the Abbey Church across all three.
The three central lower lights	"COUNSEL IN THINGS SECULAR"	Here we see William the Conqueror giving directions for the great Domesday Survey of England.
The three upper lights on the North side (left as one faces the window).	"DISCIPLINE"- Michael, Joshua and the Centurian.	In the descriptive notes it says that Michael "subdues the enemy by appeal to God"; "The Lord rebuke thee". Jude ix. Joshua is shown standing at the salute and acknowledges the "Captain of the Lord’s Host"; "What saith my Lord unto his servant"- Joshua v.14. The Centurian Longinus is described as "A man under authority" – Matt.viii. 9.
The three lower lights on the North side (left as one faces the window)	"DISCIPLINE"- Moses, King Alfred and Gideon	Moses is described as "The great leader-only erring when transgressing Discipline"- Numbers xxi.12. King Alfred we are told "recovered the larger part of England from the Danish invaders", whereas Gideon represents "The triumph of Discipline over Numbers".
The three upper lights on the South side (on the right as one faces the window).	"Valour"- St George in the centre with St Alban and St Edmund.	The notes describes St Alban as "The Martyr-and the first in England to be faithful unto death" and St Edmund "King of the East Angles and Martyr, A.D.870- Slain by the Danes (One of the Patrons of English Valour all through the Middle Ages)"
The three lower lights on the South side (on the right as one faces the window.)	"Valour"- St Louis, David and Richard the Lionheart.	The notes remind us that St Louis was "King of France-Crusader. A.D.1270" and represents "Valour under Defeat". Whall explains that his painting of St Louis was adapted from the portrait by Giotti in Florence. David is described as "King of Israel" and representing "Valour against Odds". Richard- "Coeur de Lion" represents "The natural born Soldier".
Base of window	Shields	Shields include- 1. Edward the Confessor. 2. The Gloucestershire Regiment. 3. William the Conqueror. 4. Dean and Chapter and Diocese. 5. Henry VIII. 6. City of Gloucester. 7. Richard I. 8. The Gloucestershire Yeomanry. 9. Dean of Gloucester-Dr Spence-Jones.

Underneath the window are a series of tablets on which the names of the deceased are recorded. They are of hammered and chased copper, subsequently oxidised with a view to toning the metal, in order to get as far as possible a subdued effect and so to harmonise with the solemn dignity of the Chapter House. See image below.

In the notice on the wall by the window are the closing words-

"TO THE GLORY OF GOD & IN MEMORY OF THE OFFICERS, NON-COMMISSIONED OFFICERS & MEN OF GLOUCESTERSHIRE & THE COUNTY REGIMENT WHO FELL IN THE WAR IN SOUTH AFRICA, a.d. 1899-1902".

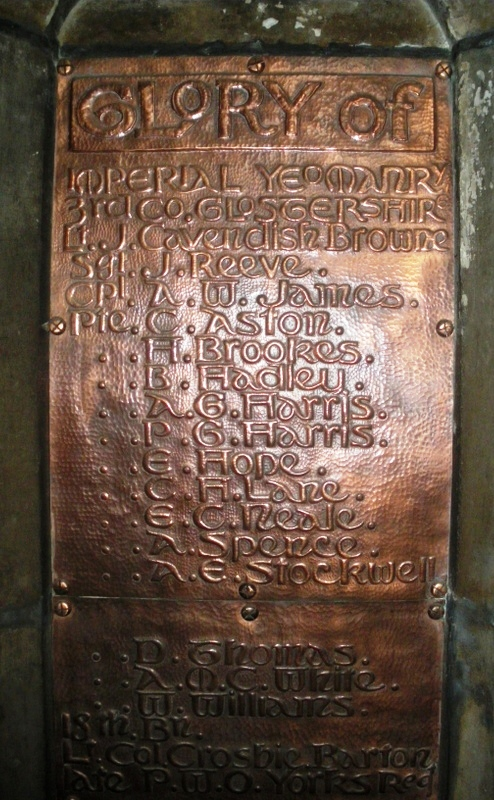
One of the tablets showing the names of those who had lain down their lives

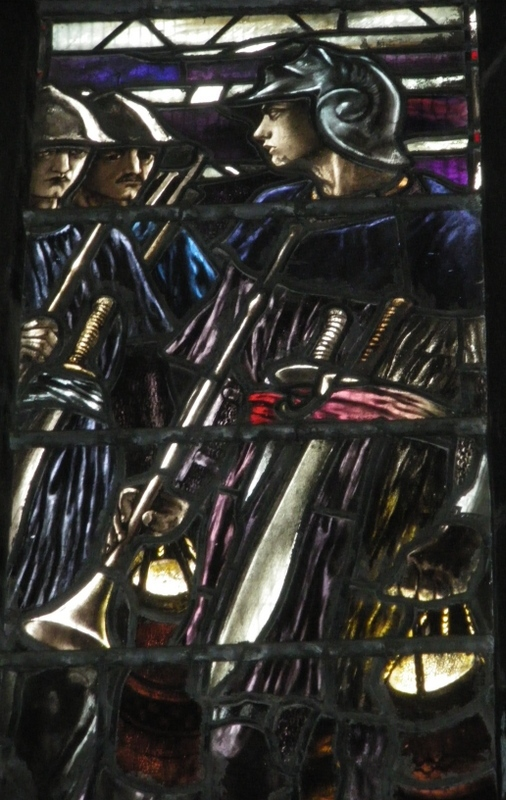
Gideon

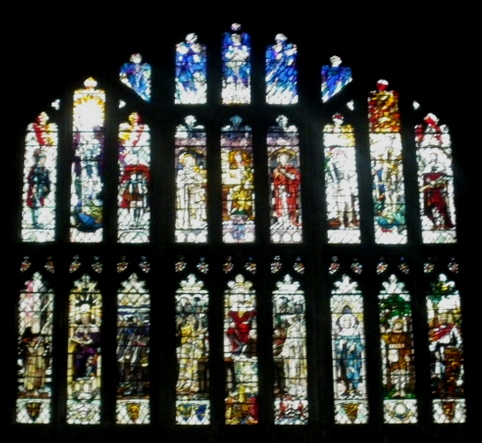
The South African War Memorial Window

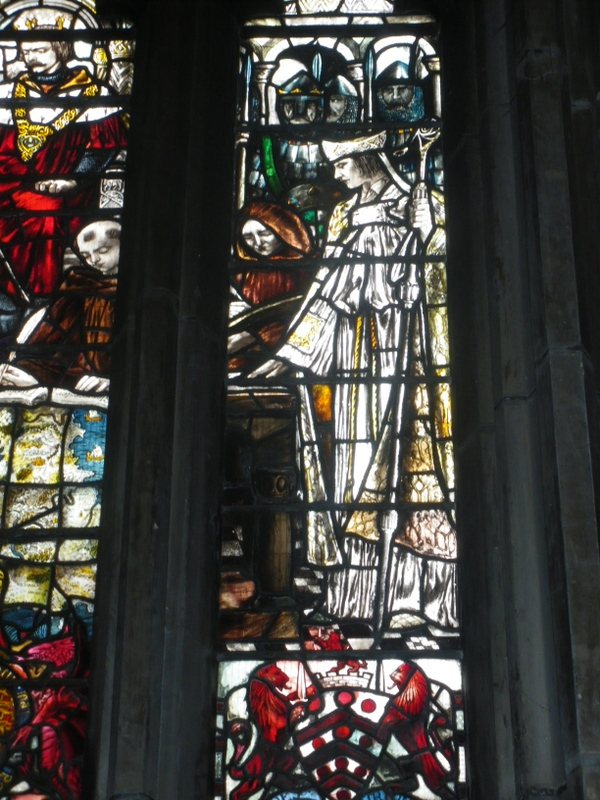
Counsel in things Secular

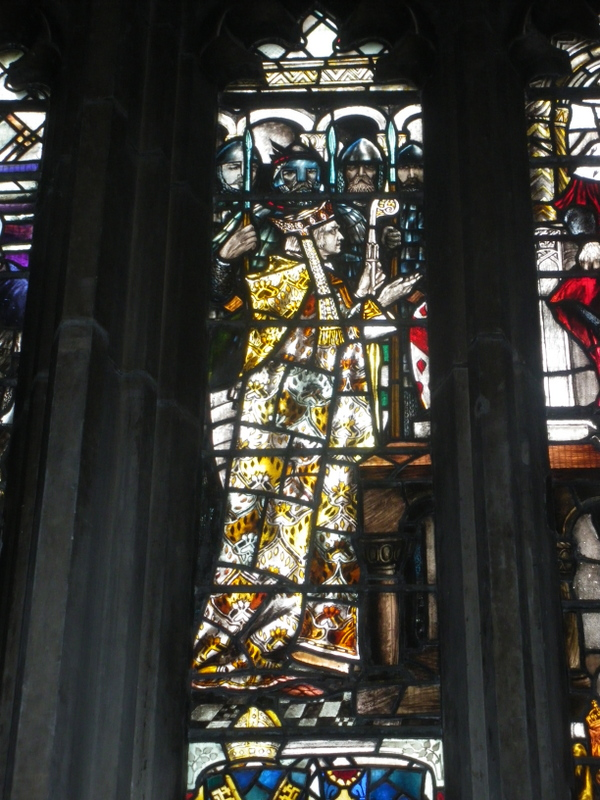
Counsel in things Secular

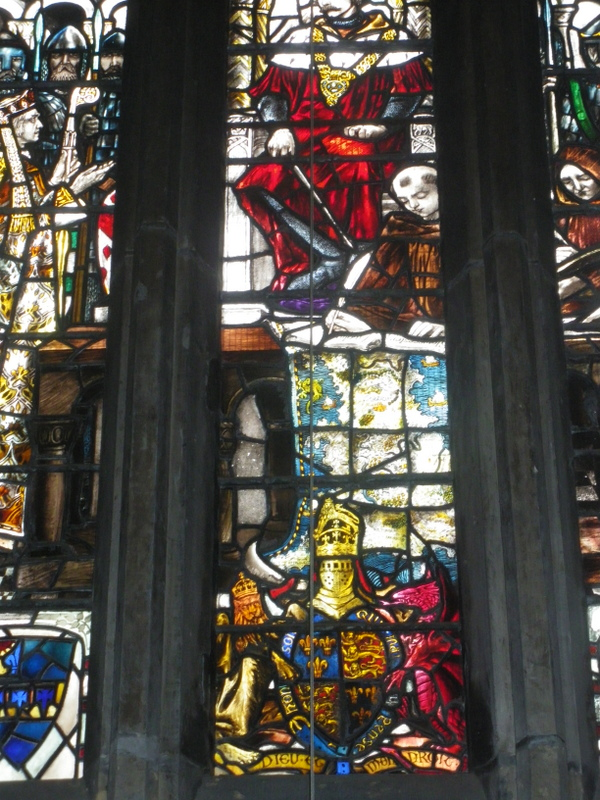
Counsel in things Secular

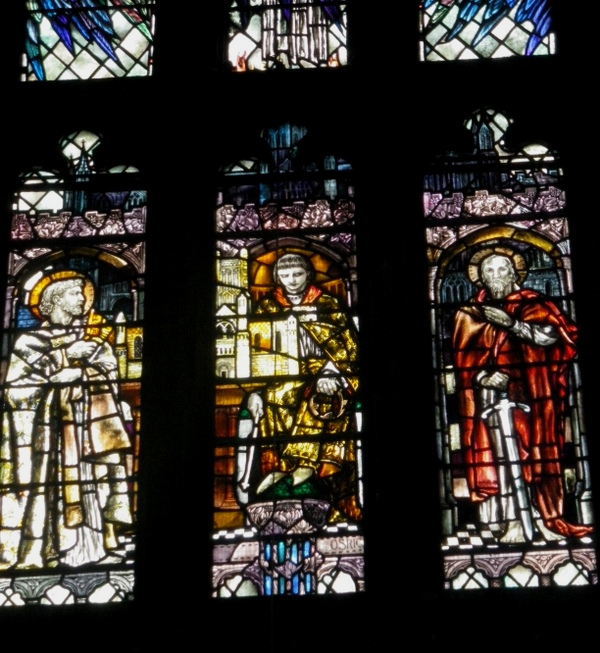
Counsel in things Sacred

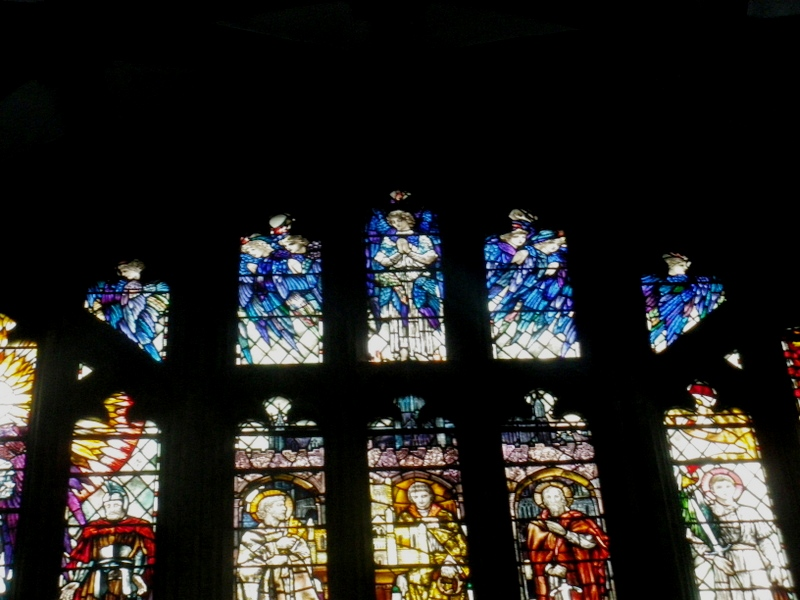
Angels in Tracery

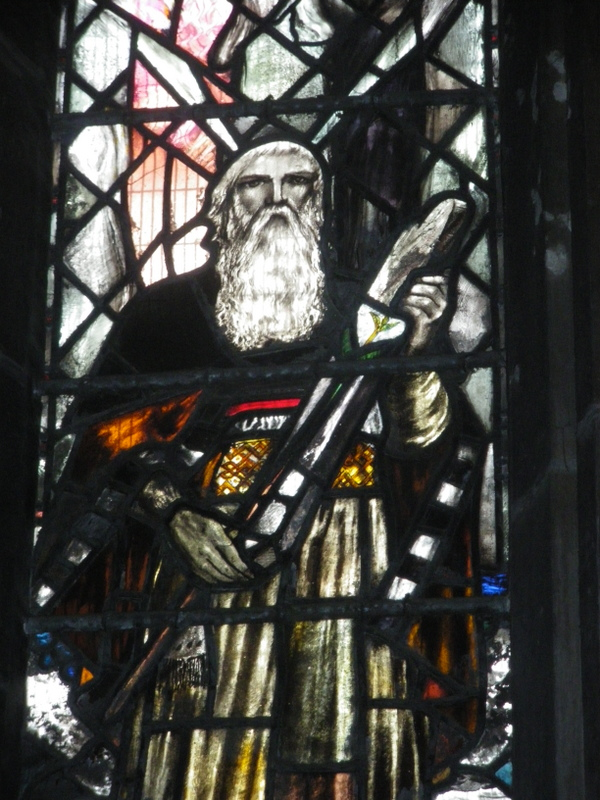
Moses

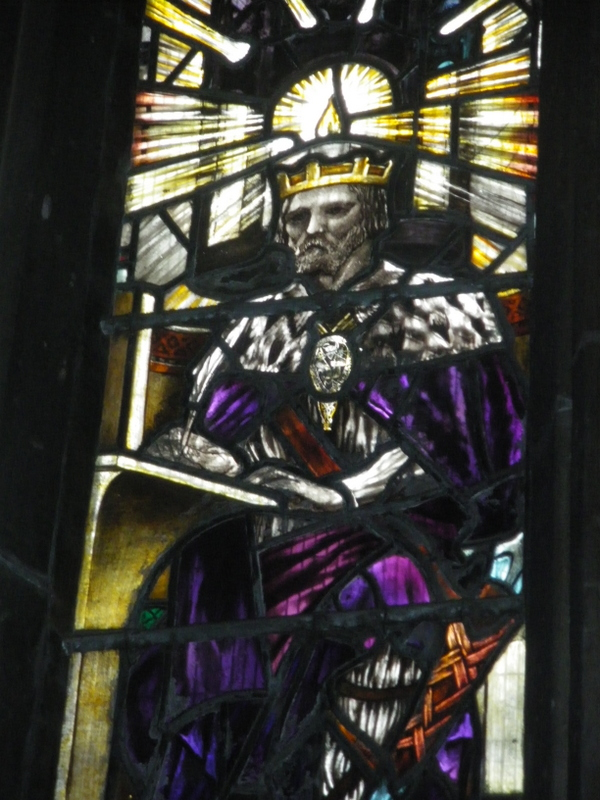
King Alfred

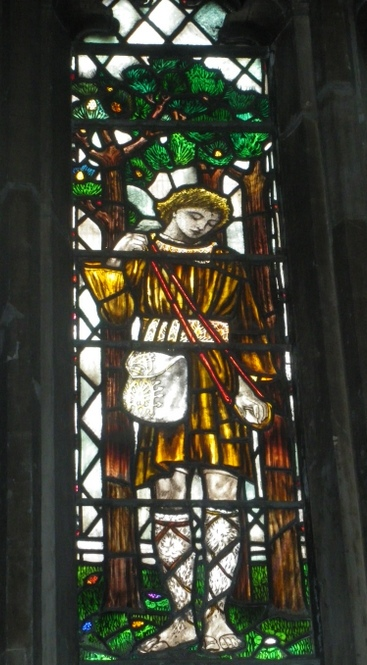
David

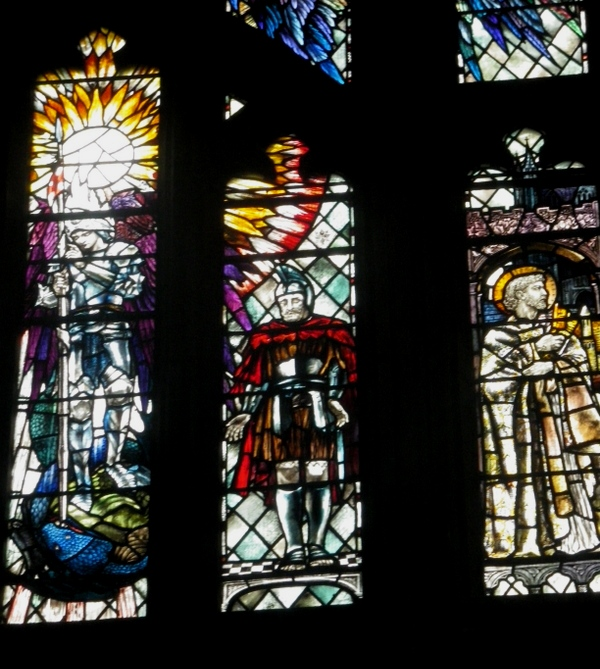
Joshua and The Centurian.

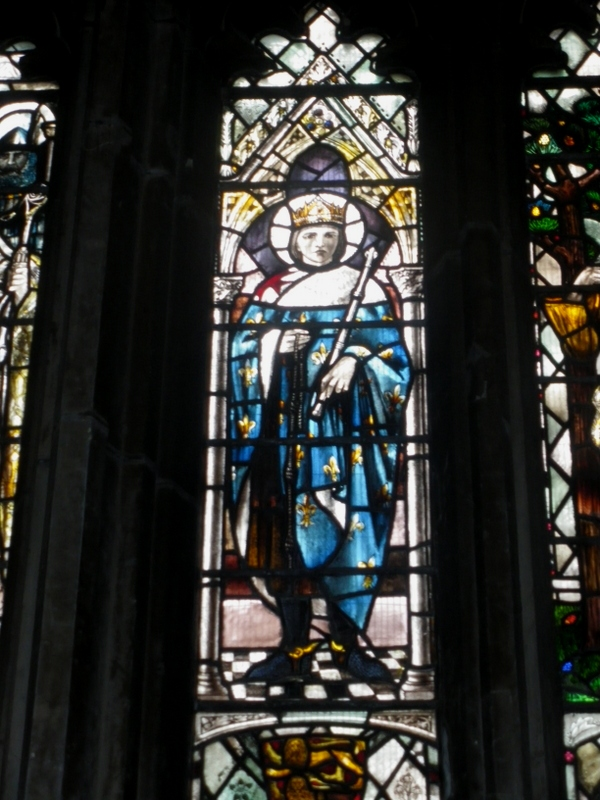
St Louis

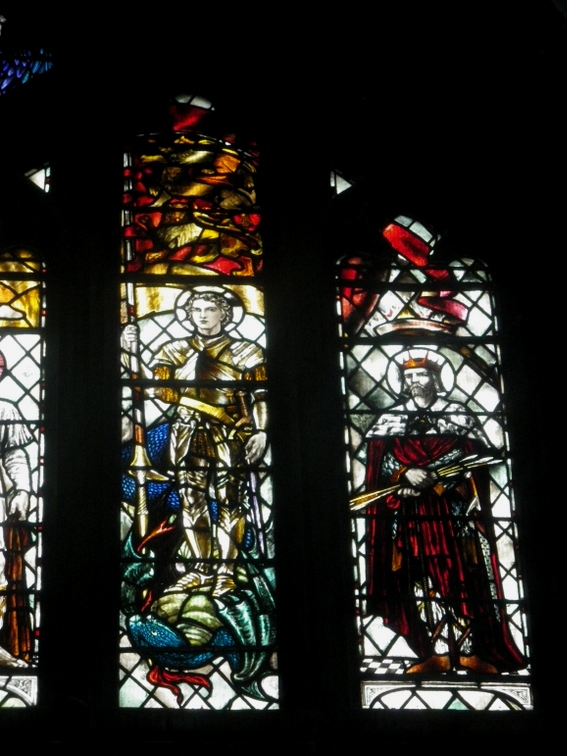
St Alban and St Edmund

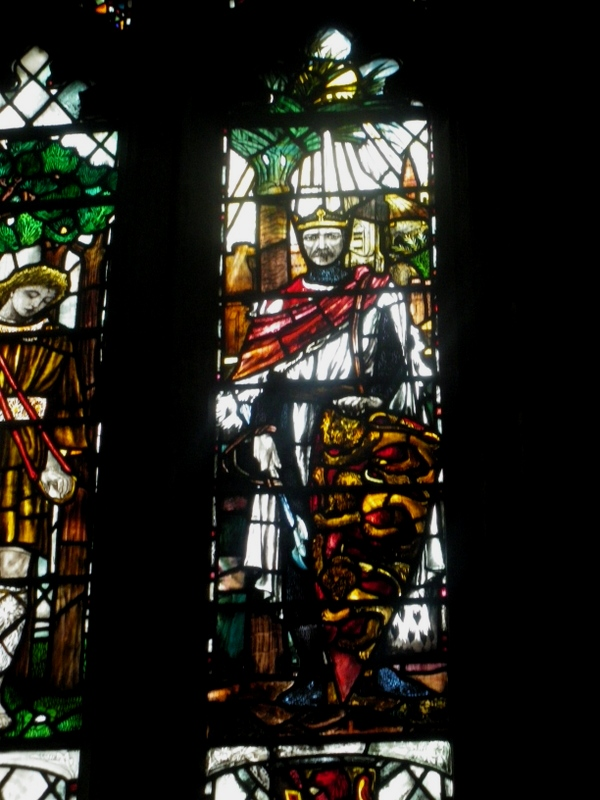
Richard the Lionheart

== Sixth window ==
Sixth window by Heaton, Butler and Bayne. 1899. Had the sixth window been elsewhere in the Cathedral it would one suspects have been treated as a typical Victorian window, the sort that Pevsner may have described as "over-sentimental". Below are some of the angels at the base of the window as well as the dedication. Whall has already told us that the faces of the angels were based on the faces of the people being remembered.

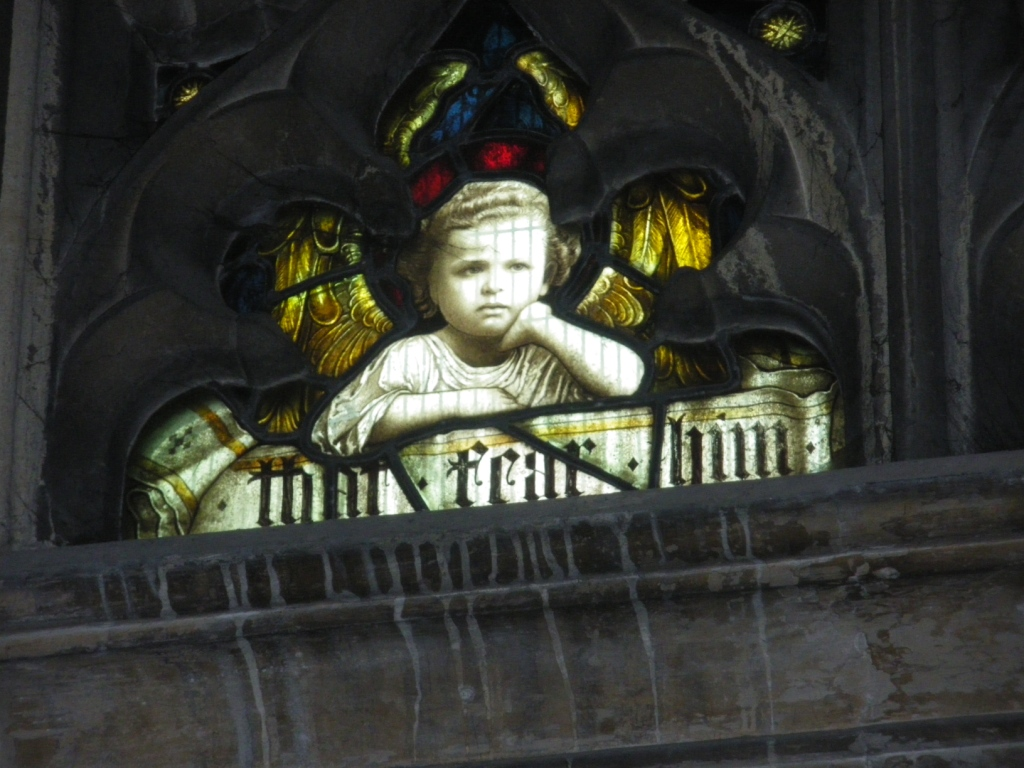
Angel in sixth window.

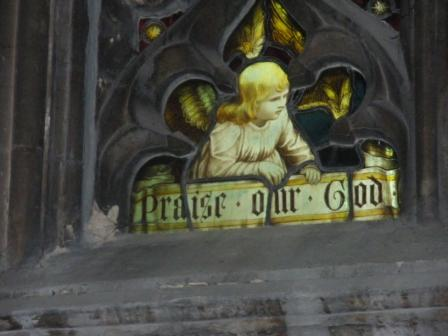
Angel in sixth window.

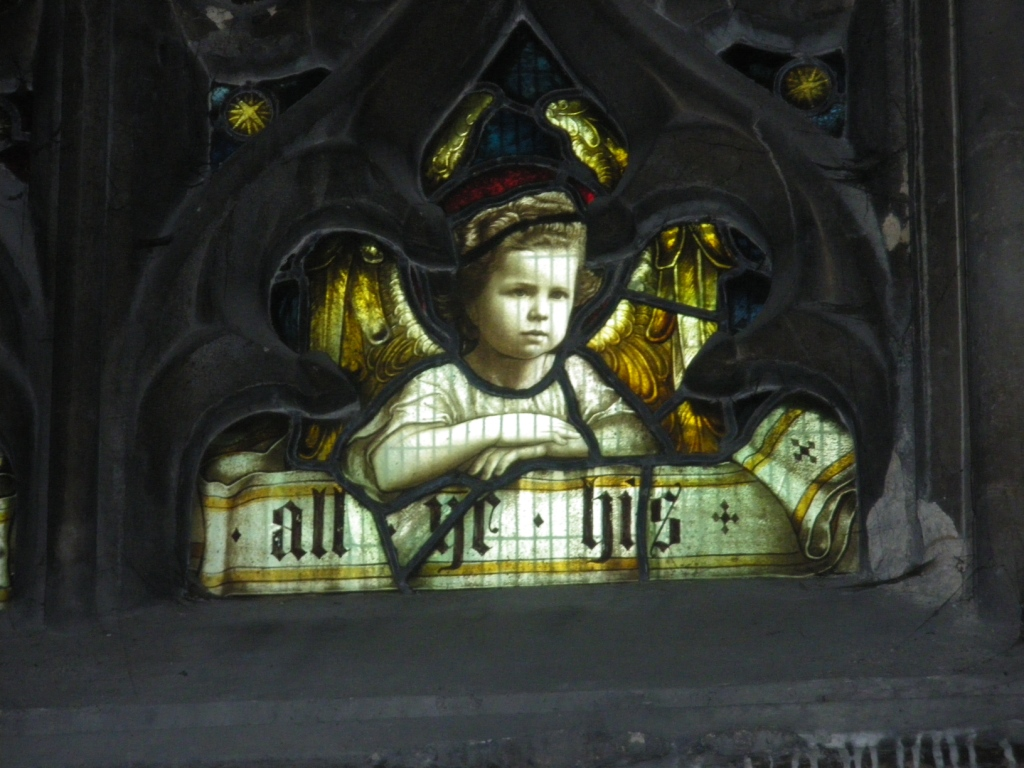
Angel in sixth window.

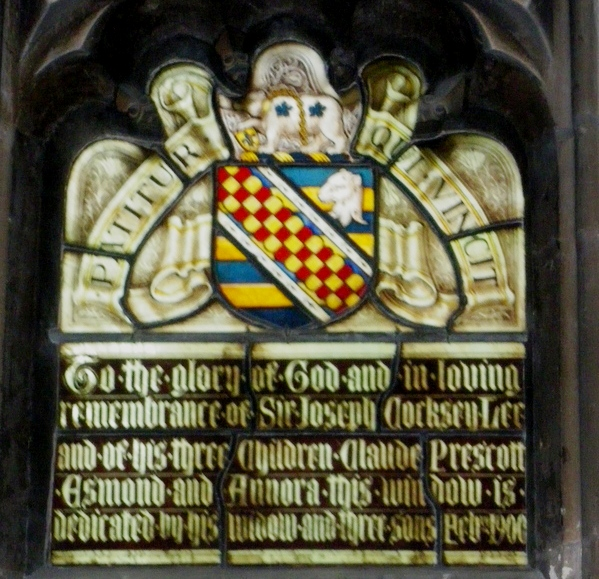
Dedication of sixth window

== The South Chantry Chapel ==
This small South Chantry is reserved by the Cathedral for the remembrance of musicians associated with the Cathedral. There are two windows by Christopher Whall and a charming set of windows by Veronica in memory of Sir Herbert Brewer. Images are shown below.

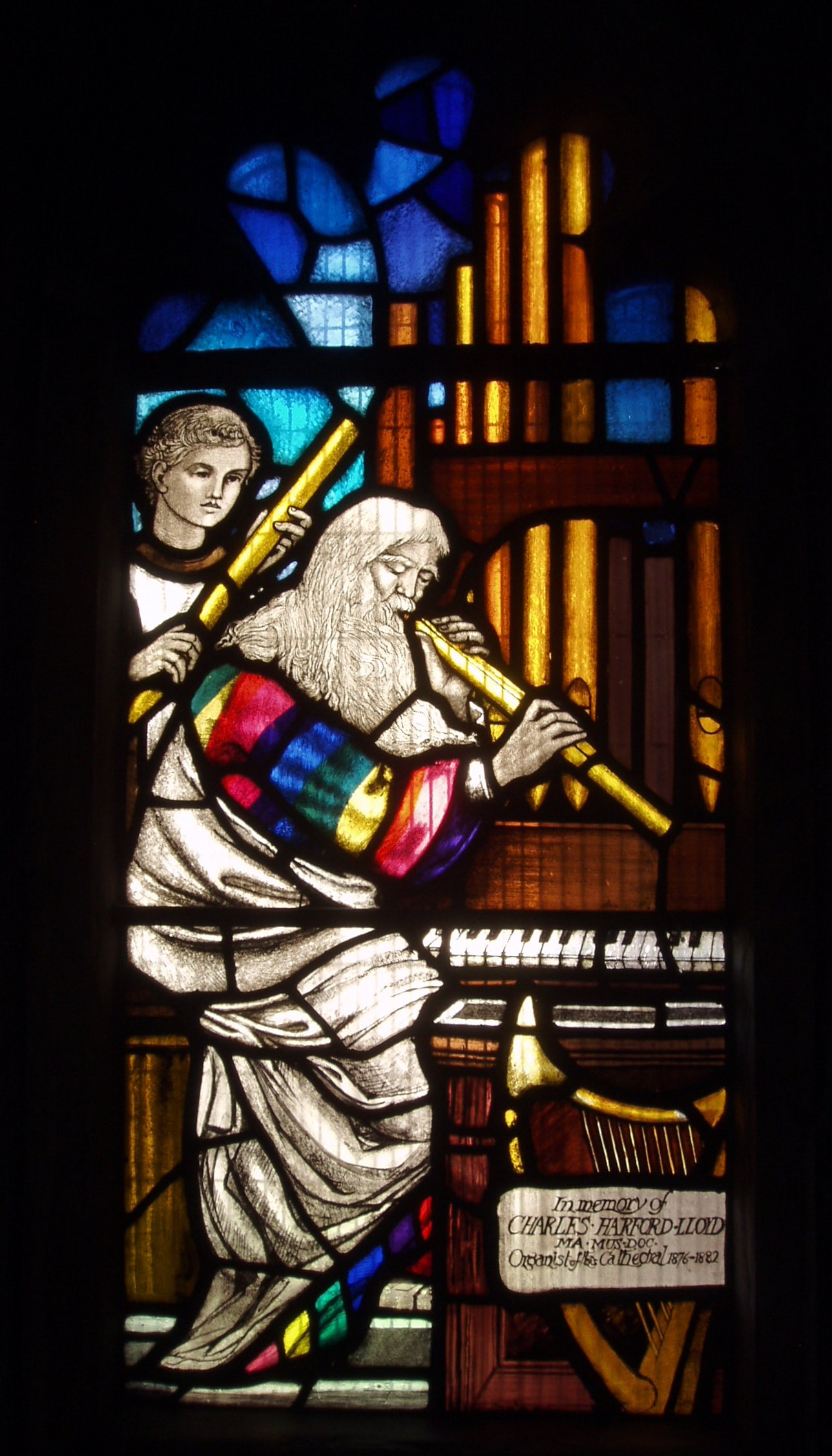
Window by Christopher Whall

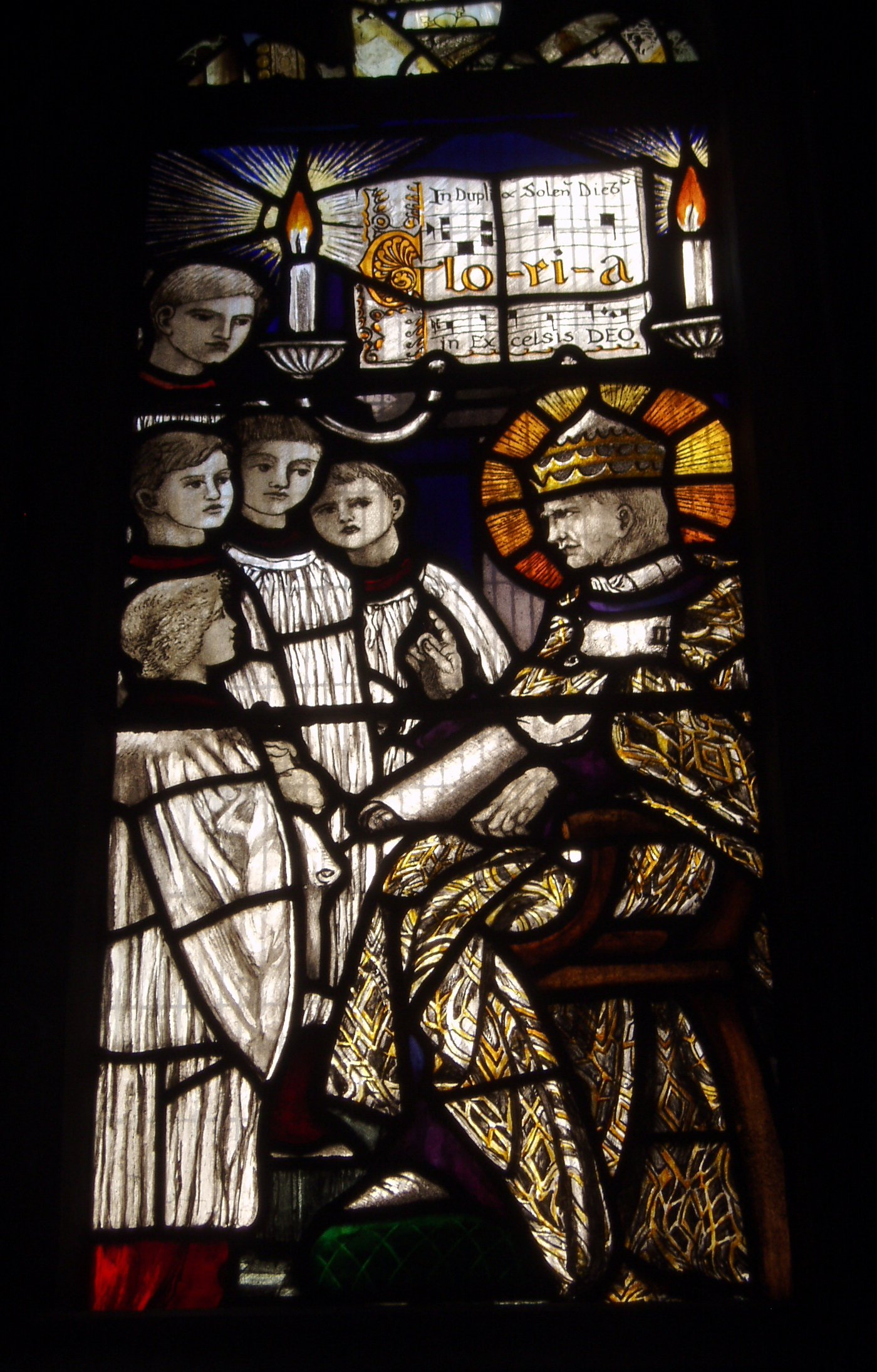
"Choristers" by Christopher Whall

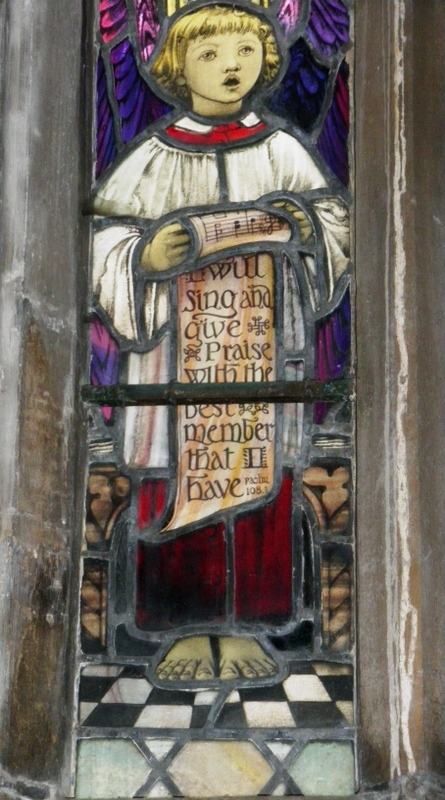
Window by Veronica Whall.

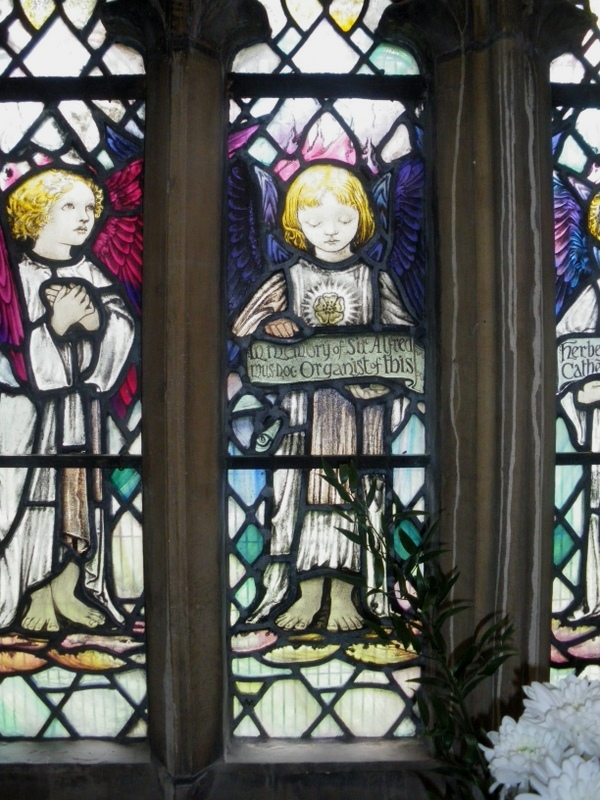
Window by Veronica Whall.

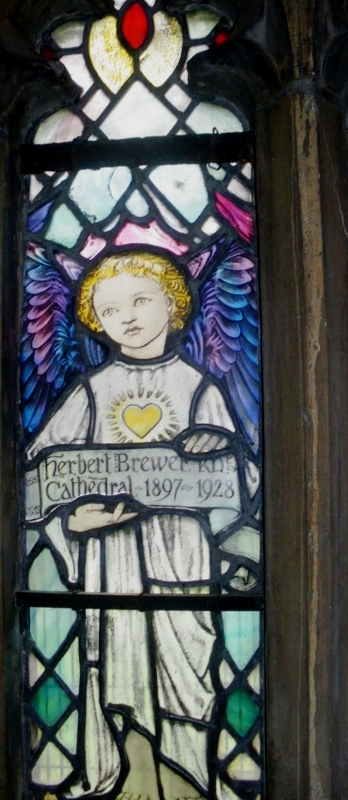
Window by Veronica Whall.

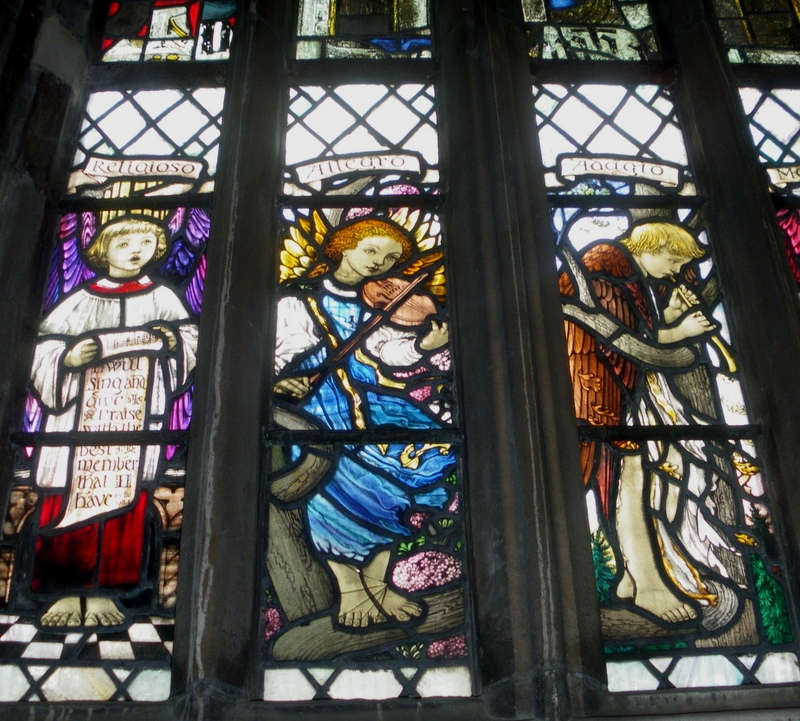
Window by Veronica Whall.

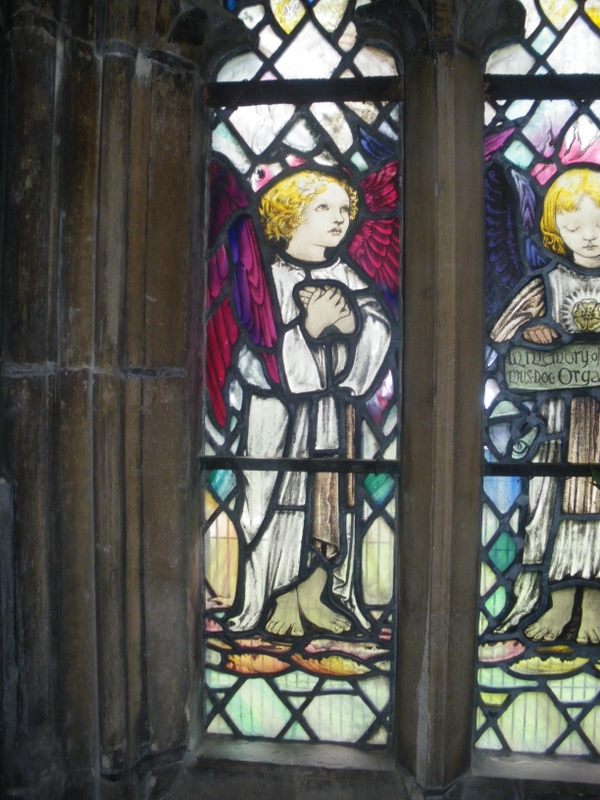
Window by Veronica Whall.

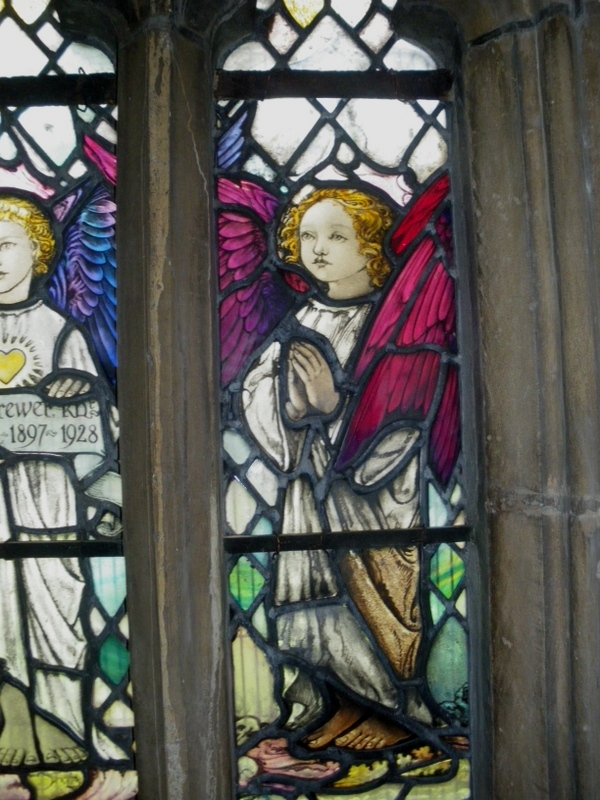
Window by Veronica Whall.

== Christopher Whall memorial window ==
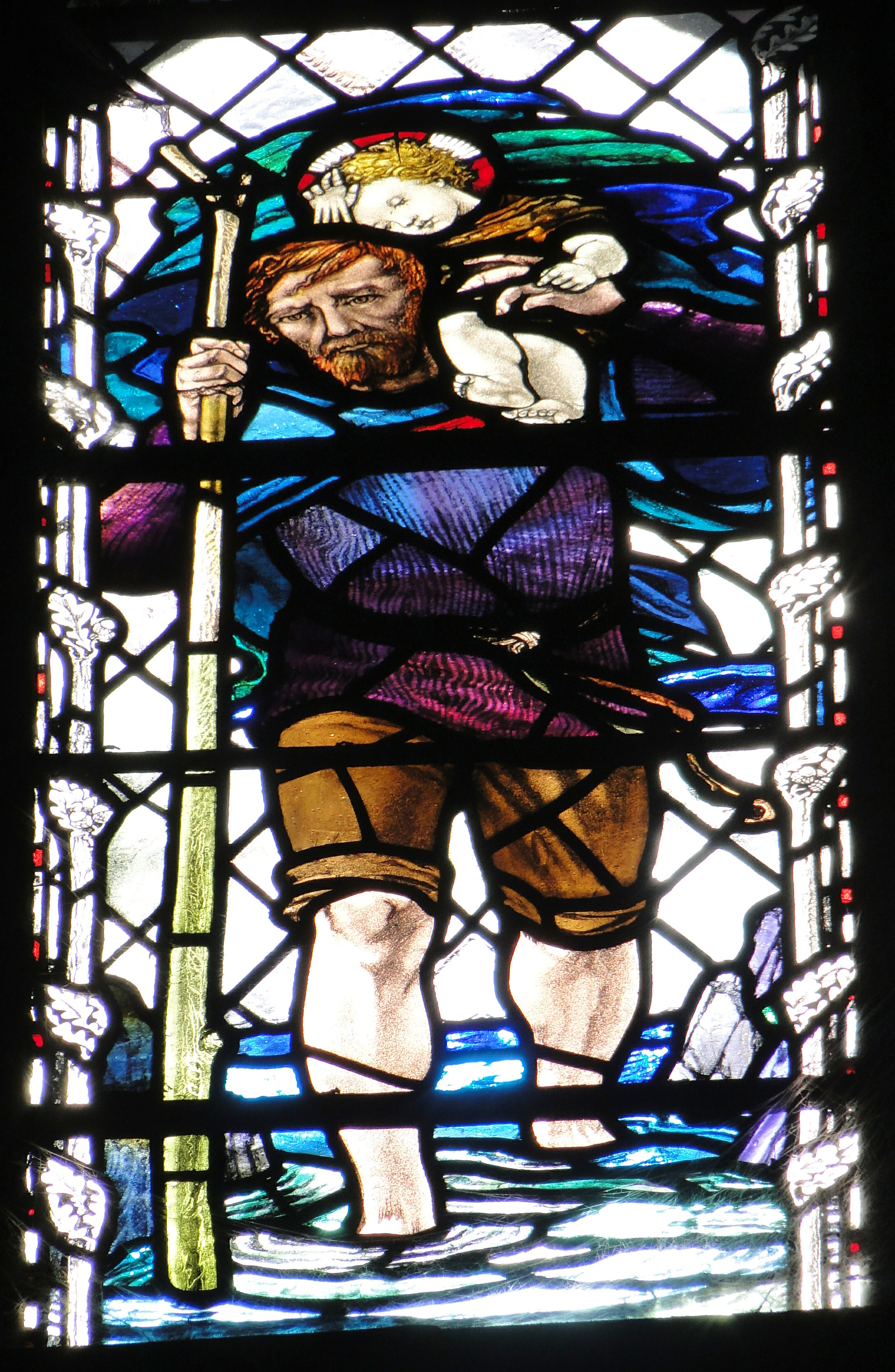
Memorial window to Christopher Whall

Memorial window to Christopher Whall by Veronica Whall. It would seem fitting to conclude the article with this window which is in the wall opposite the fifth window in the Chancel and was by Veronica Whall. It is dedicated to the memory of her father. See image above shown courtesy Rex Harris.

As one looks at the child on St Christopher's shoulders it is tempting to think that in drawing that child Veronica may have had herself in mind or perhaps thought of all the other aspiring artists who Whall had helped (carried) in their early years. The window was completed in 1926.

== Other works ==
- War Memorial windows
- Works in Scotland
- Cathedrals and Minsters windows

== See also ==
- List of works by Christopher Whall
- The works of Veronica Whall
