= Stained glass =

Colored glass and works that are made from it

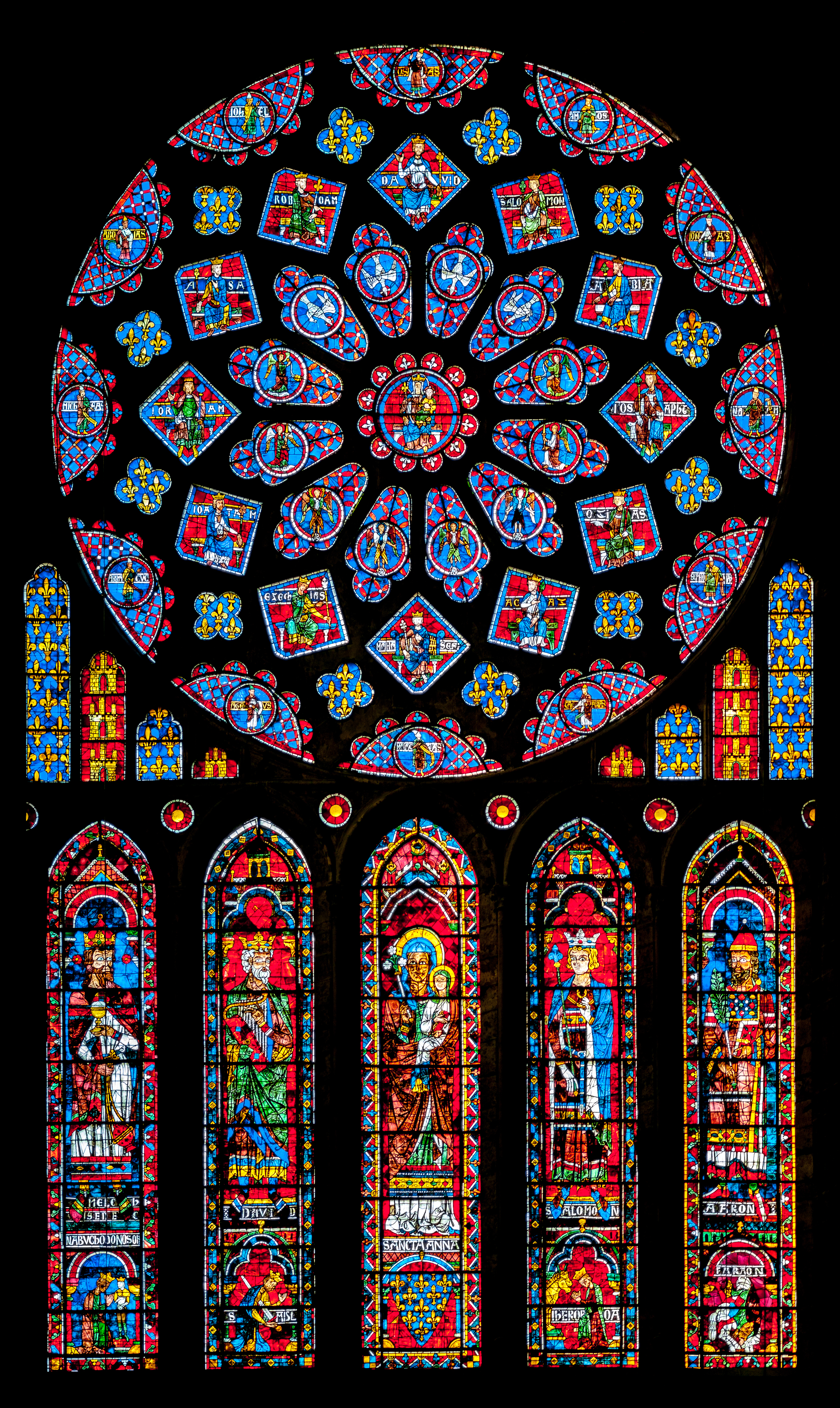
The north rose window of the Chartres Cathedral (Chartres, France), donated by Blanche of Castile. It represents the Virgin Mary, surrounded by Biblical kings and prophets. Below is St Anne, mother of the Virgin, with four righteous leaders. The window includes the arms of France and Castile.

Stained glass refers to coloured glass as a material or art and architectural works created from it. Although it is traditionally made in flat panels and used as windows, the creations of modern stained glass artists also include three-dimensional structures and sculpture. Modern vernacular usage has often extended the term "stained glass" to include domestic lead light and objets d'art created from glasswork, for example in the famous lamps of Louis Comfort Tiffany.

As a material, stained glass is glass that has been coloured by adding metallic salts during its manufacture. It may then be further decorated in various ways. The coloured glass may be crafted into a stained-glass window, in which small pieces of glass are arranged to form patterns or pictures, held together (traditionally) by strips of lead, called cames or calms, and supported by a rigid frame. Painted details and yellow-coloured silver stain are often used to enhance the design. The term stained glass is also applied to enamelled glass in which the colors have been painted onto the glass and then fused to the glass in a kiln.

Stained glass, as an art and a craft, requires the artistic skill to conceive an appropriate and workable design, and the engineering skills to assemble the piece. A window must fit snugly into the space for which it is made, must resist wind and rain, and also, especially in the larger windows, must support its own weight. Many large windows have withstood the test of time and remained substantially intact since the Late Middle Ages. In Western Europe, together with illuminated manuscripts, they constitute a major form of medieval visual art to have survived to the present day. In this context, the purpose of a stained glass window is not to allow those within a building to see the world outside or even primarily to admit light but rather to control it. For this reason stained-glass windows have been described as "illuminated wall decorations".

The design of a window may be abstract or figurative; may incorporate narratives drawn from the Bible, history, or literature; may represent saints or patrons, or use symbolic motifs, in particular armorial. Windows within a building may be thematic, for example: within a church – episodes from the life of Christ; within a parliament building – shields of the constituencies; within a college hall – figures representing the arts and sciences; or within a home – flora, fauna, or landscapes.

== Glass production ==
During the late medieval period, glass factories were set up where there was a ready supply of silica, the essential material for glass manufacture. Silica requires a very high temperature to melt, something not all glass factories were able to achieve. Such materials as potash, soda, and lead can be added to lower the melting temperature. Other substances, such as lime, are added to make the glass more stable. Glass is coloured by adding metallic oxide powders or finely divided metals while it is in a molten state. Copper oxides produce green or bluish green, cobalt makes deep blue, and gold produces wine red and violet glass. Much modern red glass is produced using copper, which is less expensive than gold and gives a brighter, more vermilion shade of red. Glass coloured while in the clay pot in the furnace is known as pot metal glass, as opposed to flashed glass, which fuses a thin layer of coloured glass to a thicker layer of colourless glass to produce the desired color.

=== Cylinder or mouth-blown ('muff') glass ===
Using a blow-pipe, a glass maker will gather a glob of molten glass that was taken from the pot heating in the furnace. The 'gather' is formed to the correct shape and a bubble of air blown into it. Using metal tools, molds of wood that have been soaking in water, and gravity, the gather is manipulated to form a long, cylindrical shape. As it cools, it is reheated so that the manipulation can continue. During the process, the bottom of the cylinder is removed. Once brought to the desired size it is left to cool. One side of the cylinder is opened, and the cylinder is then put into another oven to quickly heat and flatten it, and then placed in an annealer to cool at a controlled rate, making the material more stable. "Hand-blown" or "mouth-blown" cylinder (also called muff glass) and crown glass were the types used in the traditional fabrication of stained-glass windows.

=== Crown glass ===
Crown glass is hand-blown glass created by blowing a bubble of air into a gather of molten glass and then spinning it, either by hand or on a table that revolves rapidly like a potter's wheel. The centrifugal force causes the molten bubble to open up and flatten. It can then be cut into small sheets. Glass formed this way can be either coloured and used for stained-glass windows, or uncoloured as seen in small paned windows in 16th- and 17th-century houses. Concentric, curving waves are characteristic of the process. The centre of each piece of glass, known as the "bull's-eye", is subject to less acceleration during spinning, so it remains thicker than the rest of the sheet. It also has the pontil mark, a distinctive lump of glass left by the "pontil" rod, which holds the glass as it is spun out. This lumpy, refractive quality means the bulls-eyes are less transparent, but they have still been used for windows, both domestic and ecclesiastical. Crown glass is still made today, but not on a large scale.

=== Rolled glass ===
Rolled glass (sometimes called "table glass") is produced by pouring molten glass onto a metal or graphite table and immediately rolling it into a sheet using a large metal cylinder, similar to rolling out a pie crust. The rolling can be done by hand or by machine. Glass can be "double rolled", which means it is passed through two cylinders at once (similar to the clothes wringers on older washing machines) to yield glass of a specified thickness (typically about 1/8" or 3mm). The glass is then annealed. Rolled glass was first commercially produced around the mid-1830s and is widely used today. It is often called cathedral glass, but this has nothing to do with medieval cathedrals, where the glass used was hand-blown.

=== Flashed glass ===
Architectural glass must be at least 1/8 of an inch (3 mm) thick to survive the push and pull of typical wind loads. However, in the creation of red glass, the colouring ingredients must be of a certain concentration, or the colour will not develop. This results in a colour so intense that at the thickness of 1/8 inch (3 mm), the red glass transmits little light and appears black. The method employed to create red stained glass is to laminate a thin layer of red glass to a thicker body of glass that is clear or lightly tinted, forming "flashed glass".

A lightly coloured molten gather is dipped into a pot of molten red glass, which is then blown into a sheet of laminated glass using either the cylinder (muff) or the crown technique described above. Once this method was found for making red glass, other colours were made this way as well. A great advantage is that the double-layered glass can be engraved or abraded to reveal the clear or tinted glass below. The method allows rich detailing and patterns to be achieved without needing to add more lead-lines, giving artists greater freedom in their designs. A number of artists have embraced the possibilities flashed glass gives them. For instance, 16th-century heraldic windows relied heavily on a variety of flashed colours for their intricate crests and creatures. In the medieval period the glass was abraded; later, hydrofluoric acid was used to remove the flash in a chemical reaction (a very dangerous technique), and in the 19th century sandblasting started to be used for this purpose.

Islamic civilization played a major role in inspiring the art of stained glass from the 8th century onward. Mosques, homes, and cities were transformed into beautiful spaces decorated with glass. Beauty and function were essential elements of design in Islamic civilization. Perhaps in an effort to supply thousands of mosques, but also thanks to the input provided by thriving scientific activity in fields such as optics and chemistry, Islamic glassmakers transformed what had previously been a craft into Islamic stained glass, an industry employing new technologies and a large workforce from across Islamic civilization.

Across Islamic civilization, glass vessels were mass-produced from the 8th century onwards, either by blowing liquid glass in chambers or by cutting it from crystal. Glassmakers in Syria, and to a lesser extent Egypt, inherited and improved upon this glassmaking technique, developing their own techniques for mastering the art of Islamic stained glass, its coloring, and its decoration, expanding the variety of products.

The history of stained glass in Syria dates back to ancient times, as Syria was influenced by successive civilizations, such as the Roman and Byzantine. Syrian stained glass is characterized by its intricate geometric and floral designs, reflecting the skill of Syrian artisans.

There are a number of glass factories, particularly in Germany, the United States, England, France, Poland, Russia, and Syria, which produce high-quality glass, both hand-blown (cylinder, disc, and crown) and rolled (cathedral and opalescent). Contemporary stained glass artists have a number of resources to draw on in their work for centuries from other artists, from whom they learn, continuing the tradition in new ways. In the late 19th and 20th centuries, there were many innovations in techniques and types of glass used. Many new types of glass were developed for use in stained glass windows, notably Tiffany glass and stained glass panels.

== Techniques ==
=== "Pot metal" and flashed glass ===
The primary method of including colour in stained glass is to use glass, originally colourless, that has been given colouring by mixing with metal oxides in its melted state (in a crucible or "pot"), producing glass sheets that are coloured all the way through; these are known as "pot metal" glass. A second method, sometimes used in some areas of windows, is flashed glass, a thin coating of coloured glass fused to colourless glass (or coloured glass, to produce a different colour). In medieval glass flashing was especially used for reds, as glass made with gold compounds was very expensive and tended to be too deep in colour to use at full thickness.

=== Glass paint ===
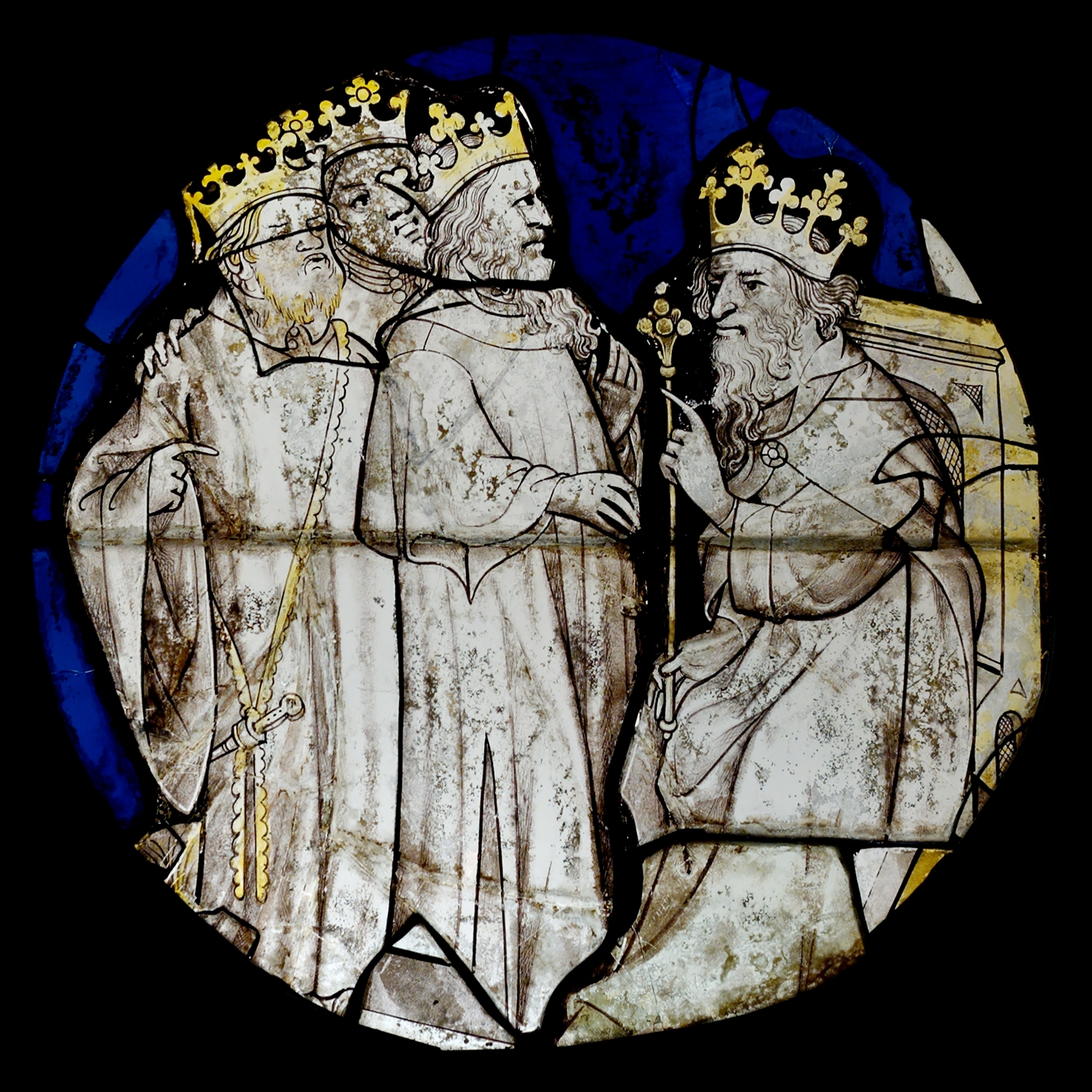
Grisaille stained glass (15th century)

Another group of techniques give additional colouring, including lines and shading, by treating the surfaces of the coloured sheets, and often fixing these effects by a light firing in a furnace or kiln. These methods may be used over broad areas, especially with silver stain, which gave better yellows than other methods in the Middle Ages. Alternatively they may be used for painting linear effects, or polychrome areas of detail. The most common method of adding the black linear painting necessary to define stained glass images is the use of what is variously called "glass paint", "vitreous paint", or "grisaille paint". This was applied as a mixture of powdered glass, iron or rust filings to give a black colour, clay, and oil, vinegar or water for a brushable texture, with a binder such as gum arabic. This was painted on the pieces of coloured glass, and then fired to burn away the ingredients giving texture, leaving a layer of the glass and colouring, fused to the main glass piece.

=== Silver stain ===
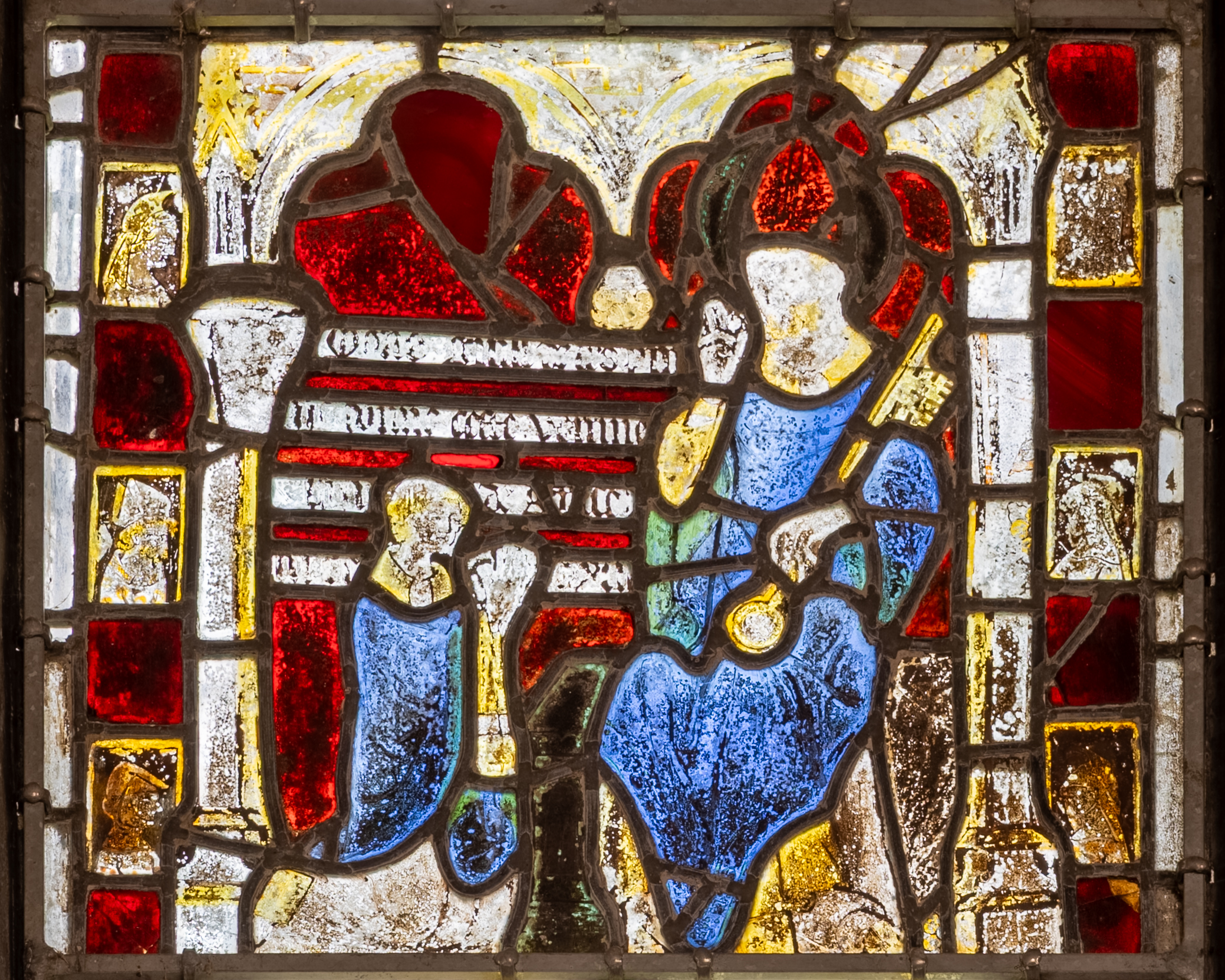
This panel of a window from a parish church in Le Mesnil-Villeman uses "silver stain" in an already masterly fashion and is in its inscription dated to the year 1313, making it the earliest dated window using this technique.

"Silver stain", introduced soon after 1300, produced a wide range of yellow to orange colours; this is the "stain" in the term "stained glass". Silver compounds (notably silver nitrate) are mixed with binding substances, applied to the surface of glass, and then fired in a furnace or kiln. They can produce a range of colours from orange-red to yellow. Used on blue glass they produce greens. The way the glass is heated and cooled can significantly affect the colours produced by these compounds. The chemistry involved is complex and not well understood. The chemicals actually penetrate the glass they are added to a little way, and the technique therefore gives extremely stable results. By the 15th century it had become cheaper than using pot metal glass and was often used with glass paint as the only colour on transparent glass. Silver stain was applied to the opposite face of the glass to silver paint, as the two techniques did not work well one on top of the other. The stain was usually on the exterior face, where it appears to have given the glass some protection against weathering, although this can also be true for paint. They were also probably fired separately, the stain needing a lower heat than the paint.

=== "Sanguine" or "Cousin's rose" ===
"Sanguine", "carnation", "Rouge Jean Cousin" or "Cousin's rose", after its supposed inventor, is an iron-based fired paint producing red colours, mainly used to highlight small areas, often on flesh. It was introduced around 1500. Copper stain, similar to silver stain but using copper compounds, also produced reds, and was mainly used in the 18th and 19th centuries.

=== Cold painting ===
"Cold paint" is various types of paint that were applied without firing. Contrary to the optimistic claims of the 12th century writer Theophilus Presbyter, cold paint is not very durable, and very little medieval paint has survived.

=== Scratching techniques ===
As well as painting, scratched sgraffito techniques were often used. This involved painting a colour over pot metal glass of another colour, and then before firing selectively scratching the glass paint away to make the design, or the lettering of an inscription. This was the most common method of making inscriptions in early medieval glass, giving white or light letters on a black background, with later inscriptions more often using black painted letters on a transparent glass background.

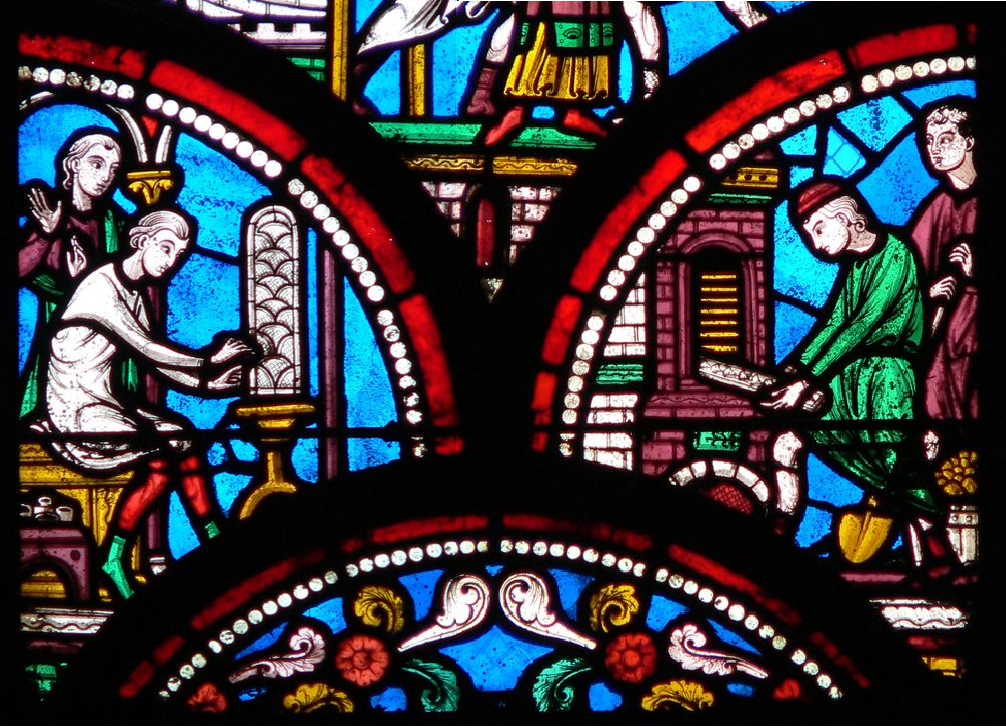
Detail from a 13th-century window in the Basilica of Saint-Quentin depicting the creation of a stained-glass window in the Middle Ages

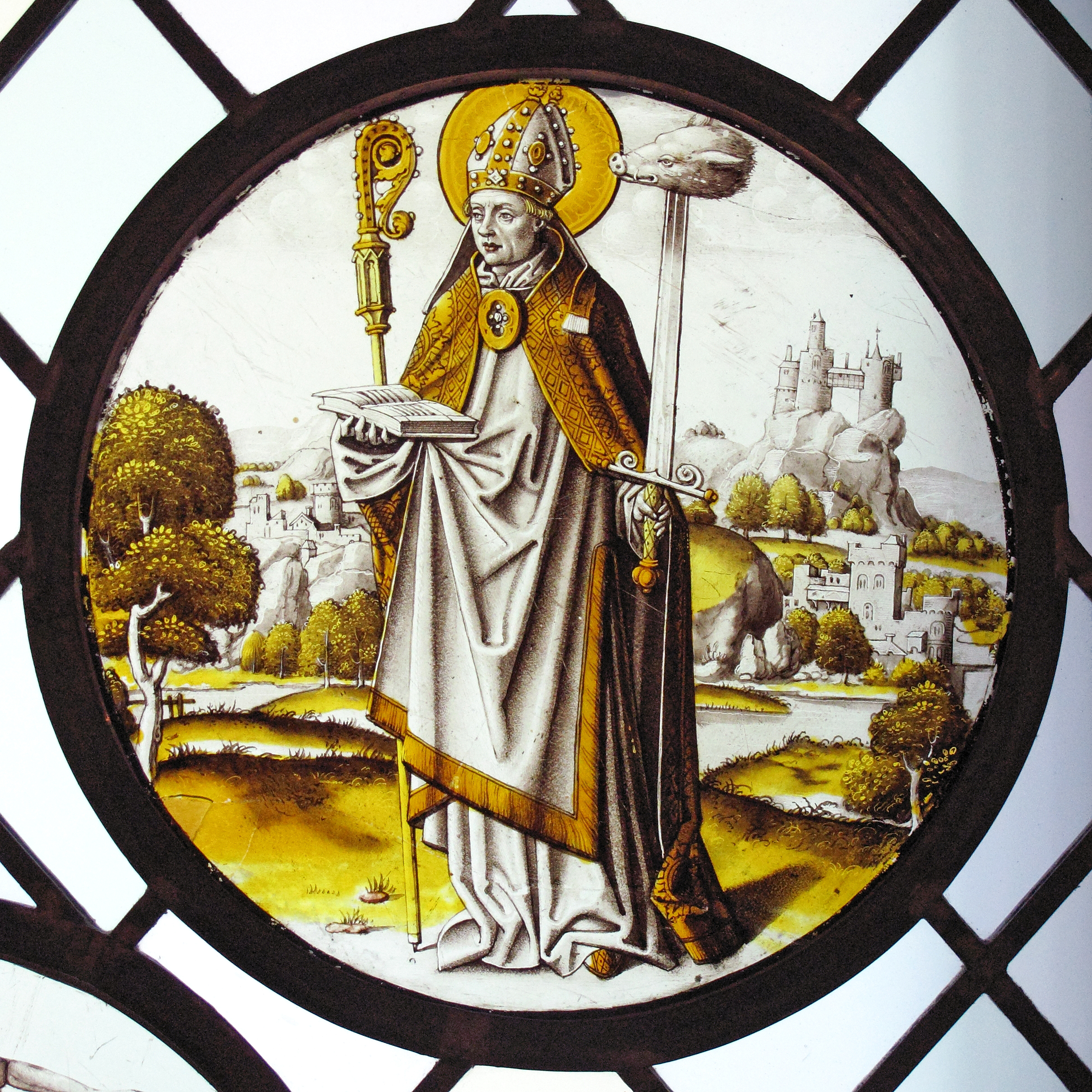
Renaissance roundel using only black or brown glass paint, and silver stain. The bishop-saint Lambrecht of Maastricht stands in an extensive landscape, 1510–20. Diameter 8 3/4 in (22 cm). Designed to be placed low, close to the viewer.

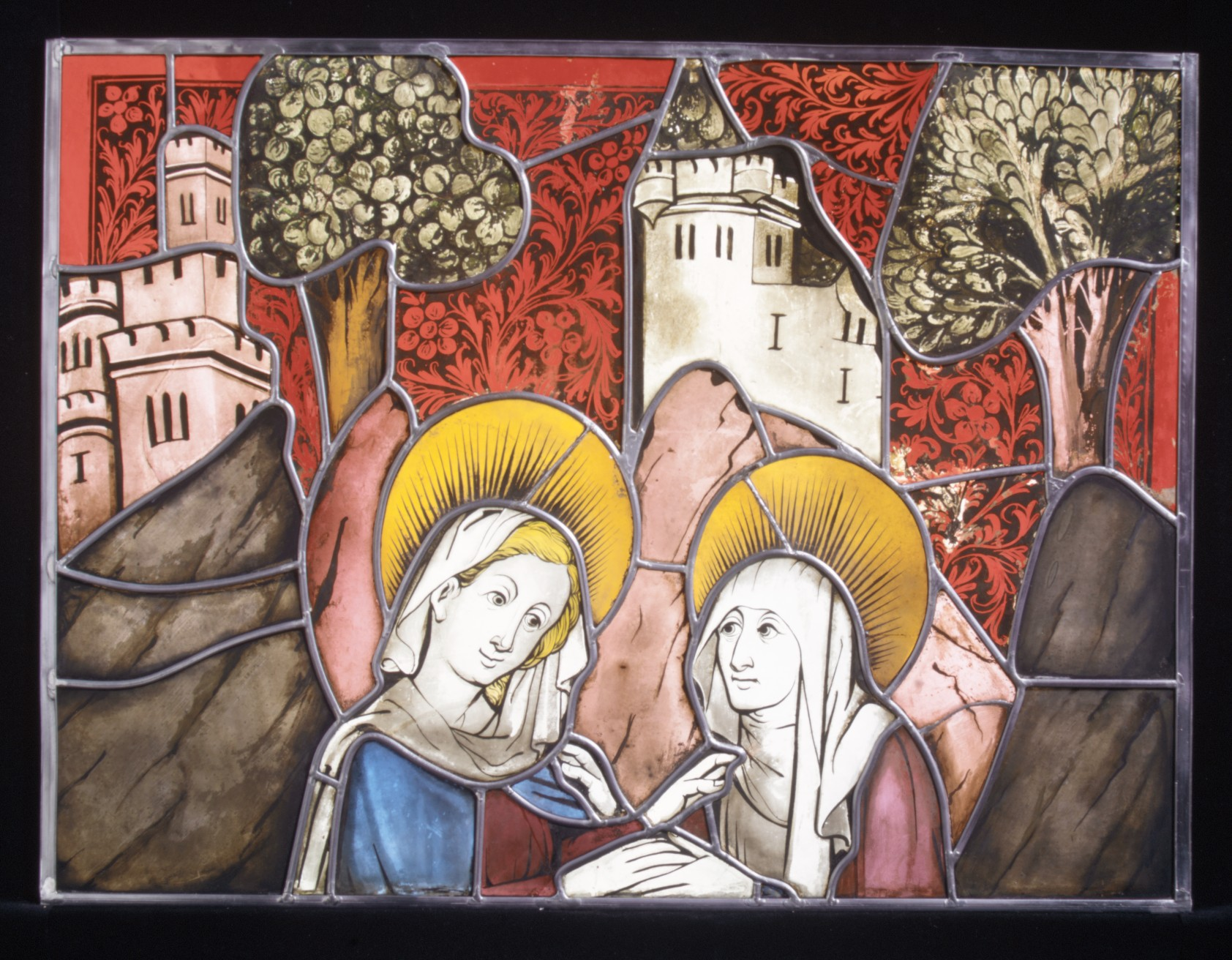
Detail of German panel (1444) of Visitation; pot metal, including white glass, black vitreous paint, yellow silver stain, and olive-green enamel. The plant patterns in the red sky are formed by scratching away black paint from the red glass before firing. Restored with new lead cames.

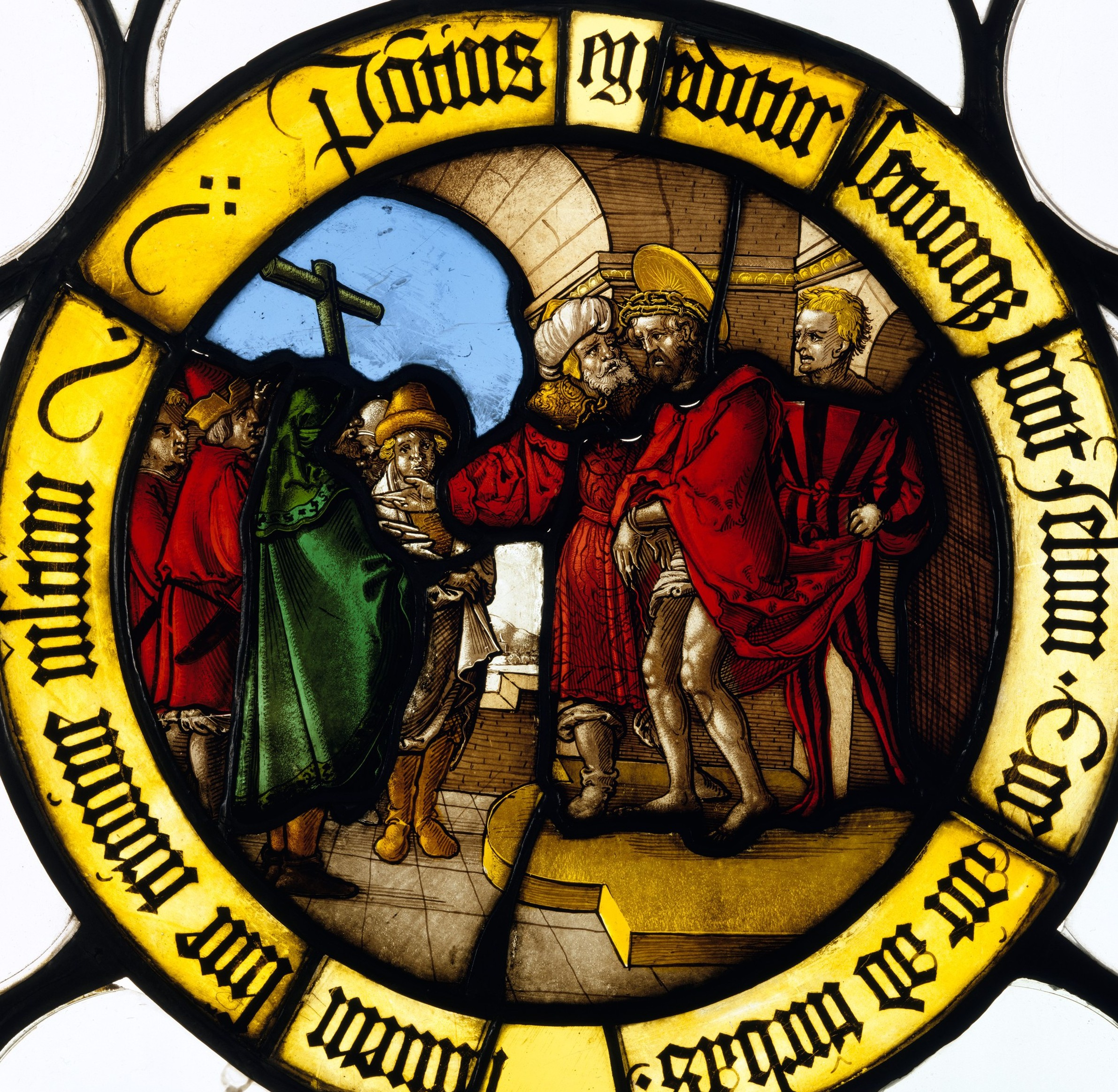
German glass, Nuremberg, after a drawing by Sebald Beham, c. 1525. Silver stain produces a range of yellows and gold, and painted on the reverse of the blue sky, gives the dark green of the cross.

== "Pot glass" colours ==
These are the colours in which the glass itself is made, as opposed to colours applied to the glass.

=== Transparent glass ===
Ordinary soda-lime glass appears colourless to the naked eye when it is thin, although iron oxide impurities produce a green tint which becomes evident in thick pieces or with the aid of scientific instruments. A number of additives are used to reduce the green tint, particularly if the glass is to be used for plain window glass, rather than stained-glass windows. These additives include manganese dioxide which produces sodium permanganate, and may result in a slightly mauve tint, characteristic of the glass in older houses in New England. Selenium has been used for the same purpose.

=== Green glass ===
While very pale green is the typical colour of transparent glass, deeper greens can be achieved by the addition of Iron(II) oxide which results in a bluish-green glass. Together with chromium it gives glass of a richer green colour, typical of the glass used to make wine bottles. The addition of chromium yields dark green glass, suitable for flashed glass. Together with tin oxide and arsenic it yields emerald green glass.

=== Blue glass ===
- In medieval times, blue glass was made by adding cobalt blue, which at a concentration of 0.025% to 0.1% in soda-lime glass achieves the brilliant blue characteristic of Chartres Cathedral.
- The addition of sulphur to boron-rich borosilicate glasses imparts a blue colour.
- The addition of copper oxide at 2–3% produces a turquoise colour.
- The addition of nickel, at different concentrations, produces blue, violet, or black glass.

=== Red glass ===
- Metallic gold, in very low concentrations (around 0.001%), produces a rich ruby-coloured glass ("ruby gold"); in even lower concentrations it produces a less intense red, often marketed as "cranberry glass". The colour is caused by the size and dispersion of gold particles. Ruby gold glass is usually made of lead glass with tin added.
- Pure metallic copper produces a very dark red, opaque glass. Glass created in this manner is generally "flashed" (laminated glass). It was used extensively in the late 19th and early 20th centuries and exploited for the decorative effects that could be achieved by sanding and engraving.
- Selenium is an important agent to make pink and red glass. When used together with cadmium sulphide, it yields a brilliant red colour known as "Selenium Ruby".

=== Yellow glass ===
- This was very often achieved by "silver stain" applied externally to the sheets of glass (see above).
- The addition of sulphur, together with carbon and iron salts, is used to form iron polysulphides and produce amber glass ranging from yellowish to almost black. With calcium it yields a deep yellow colour.
- Adding titanium produces yellowish-brown glass. Titanium is rarely used on its own and is more often employed to intensify and brighten other additives.
- Cadmium together with sulphur results in a deep yellow colour, often used in glazes. However, cadmium is toxic.
- Uranium (0.1% to 2%) can be added to give glass a fluorescent yellow or green colour. Uranium glass is typically not radioactive enough to be dangerous, but if ground into a powder, such as by polishing with sandpaper, and inhaled, it can be carcinogenic. When used with lead glass with a very high proportion of lead, it produces a deep red colour.

=== Purple glass ===
- The addition of manganese gives an amethyst colour. Manganese is one of the oldest glass additives, and purple manganese glass has been used since early Egyptian history.
- Nickel, depending on the concentration, produces blue, or violet, or even black glass. Lead crystal with added nickel acquires a purplish colour.

=== White glass ===
- Tin dioxide with antimony and arsenic oxides produce an opaque white glass, first used in Venice to produce an imitation porcelain. White glass was used extensively by Louis Comfort Tiffany to create a range of opalescent, mottled and streaky glasses.
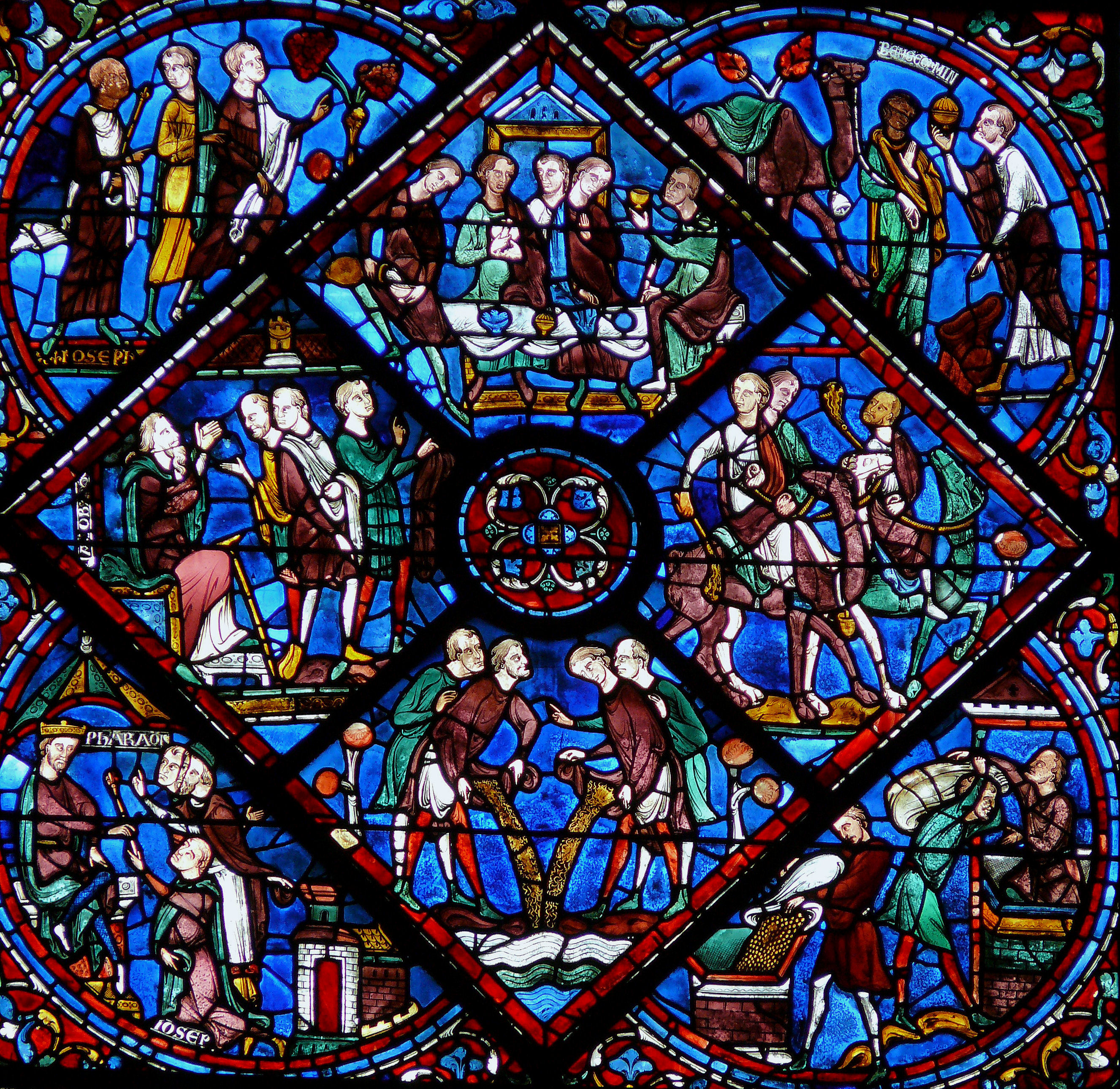
13th-century window from Chartres showing extensive use of the ubiquitous cobalt blue with green and purple-brown glass, details of amber and borders of flashed red glass

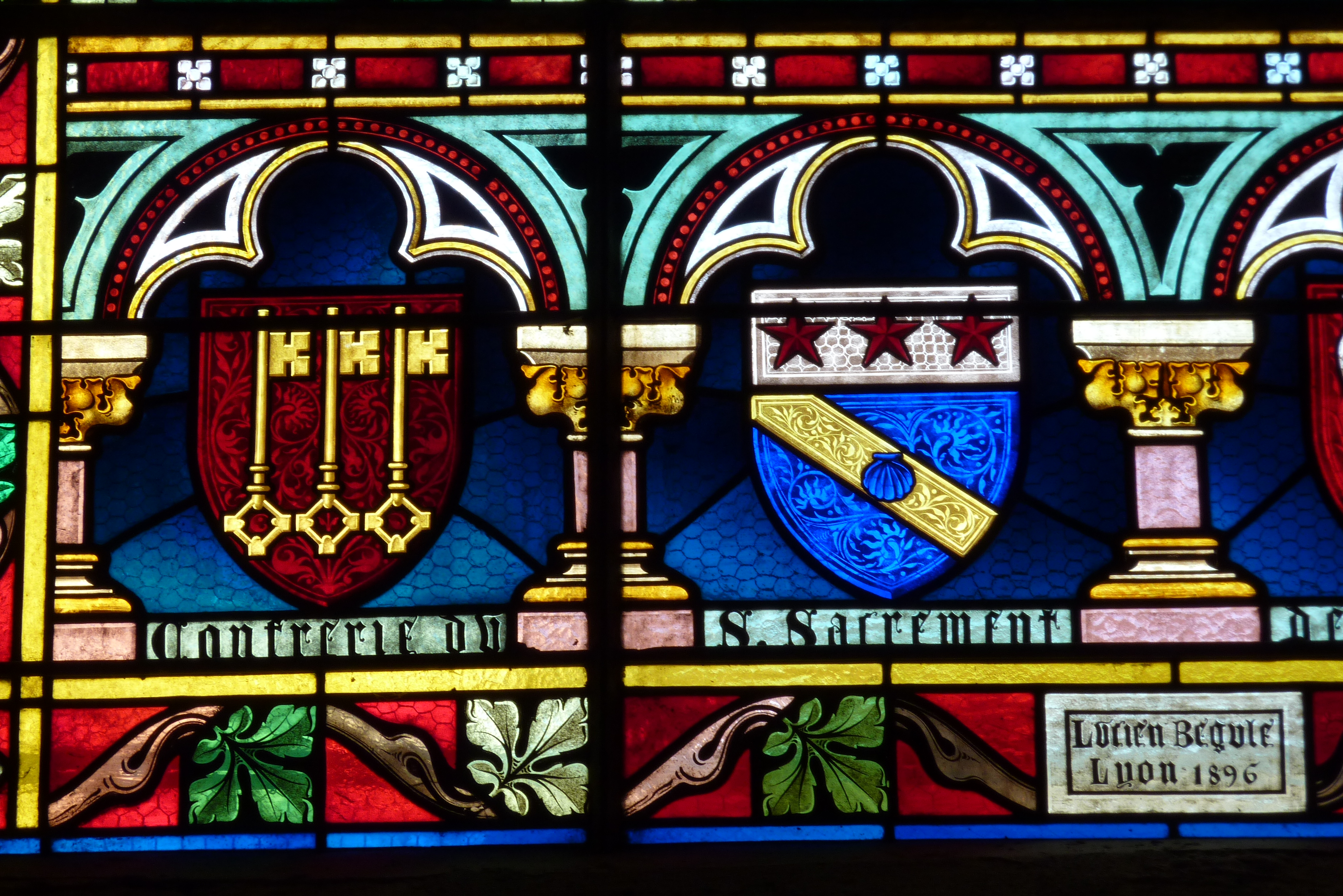
A 19th-century window illustrates the range of colours common in both medieval and Gothic Revival glass, Lucien Begule, Lyon (1896).

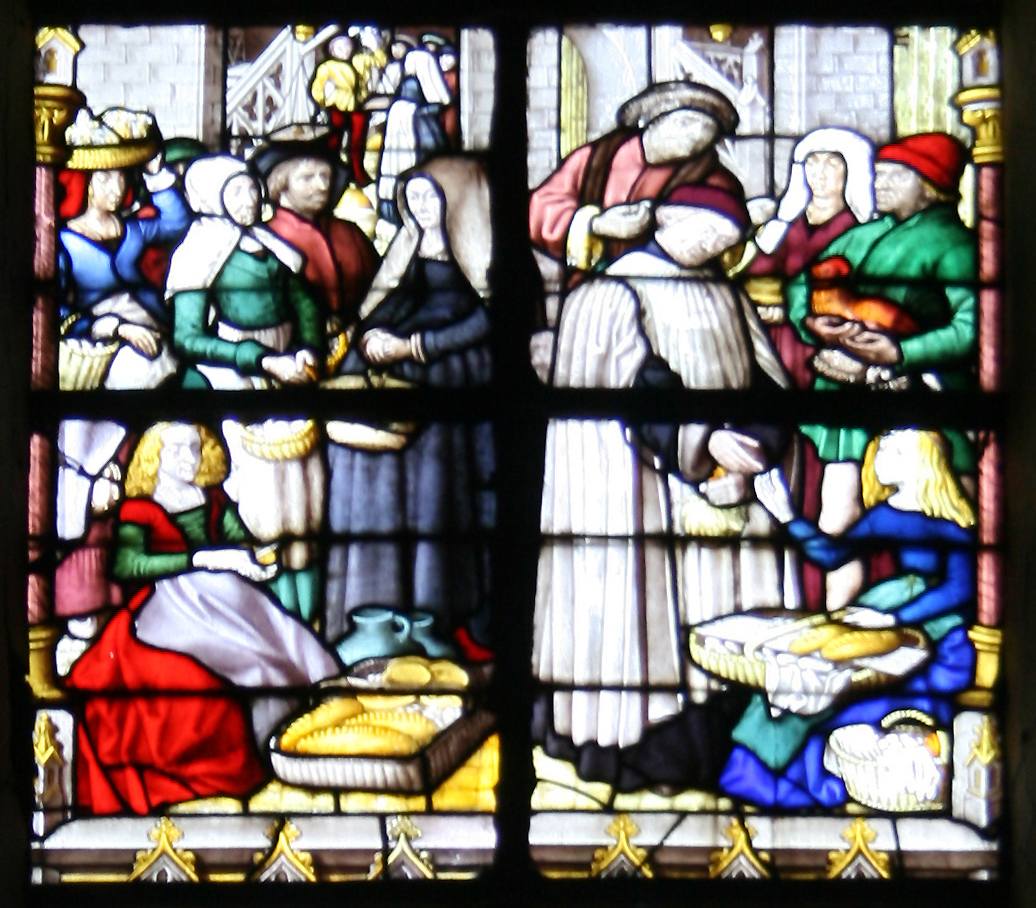
A 16th-century window by Arnold of Nijmegen showing the combination of painted glass and intense colour common in Renaissance windows

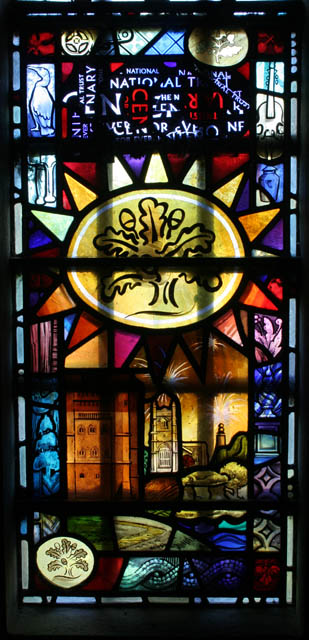
A late 20th-century window showing a graded range of colours. Ronald Whiting, Chapel Studios. Tattershall Castle, UK.

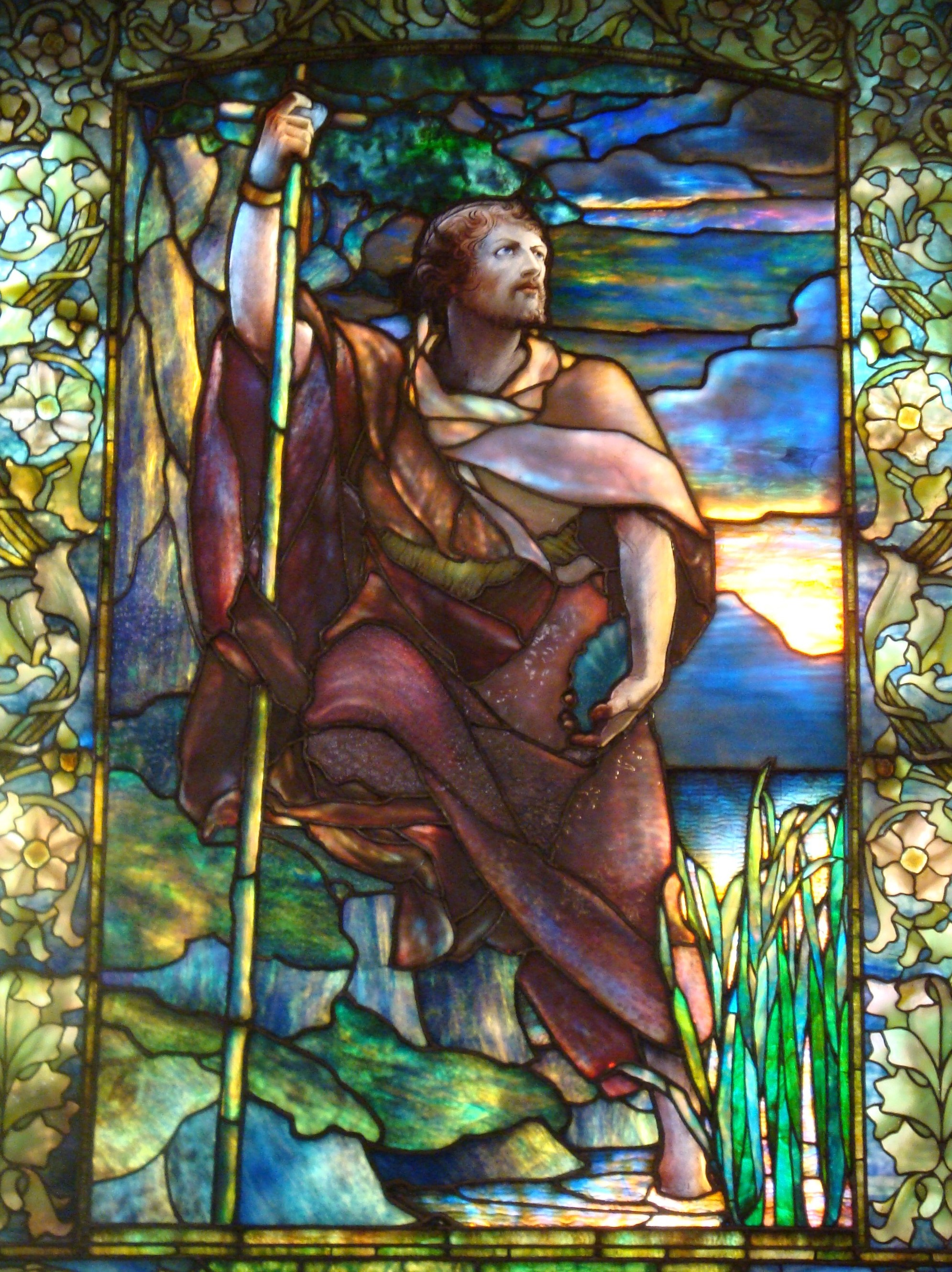
A window by Tiffany illustrating the development and use of multi-coloured flashed, streaky glasses at the end of the 19th century

== Creating stained-glass windows ==
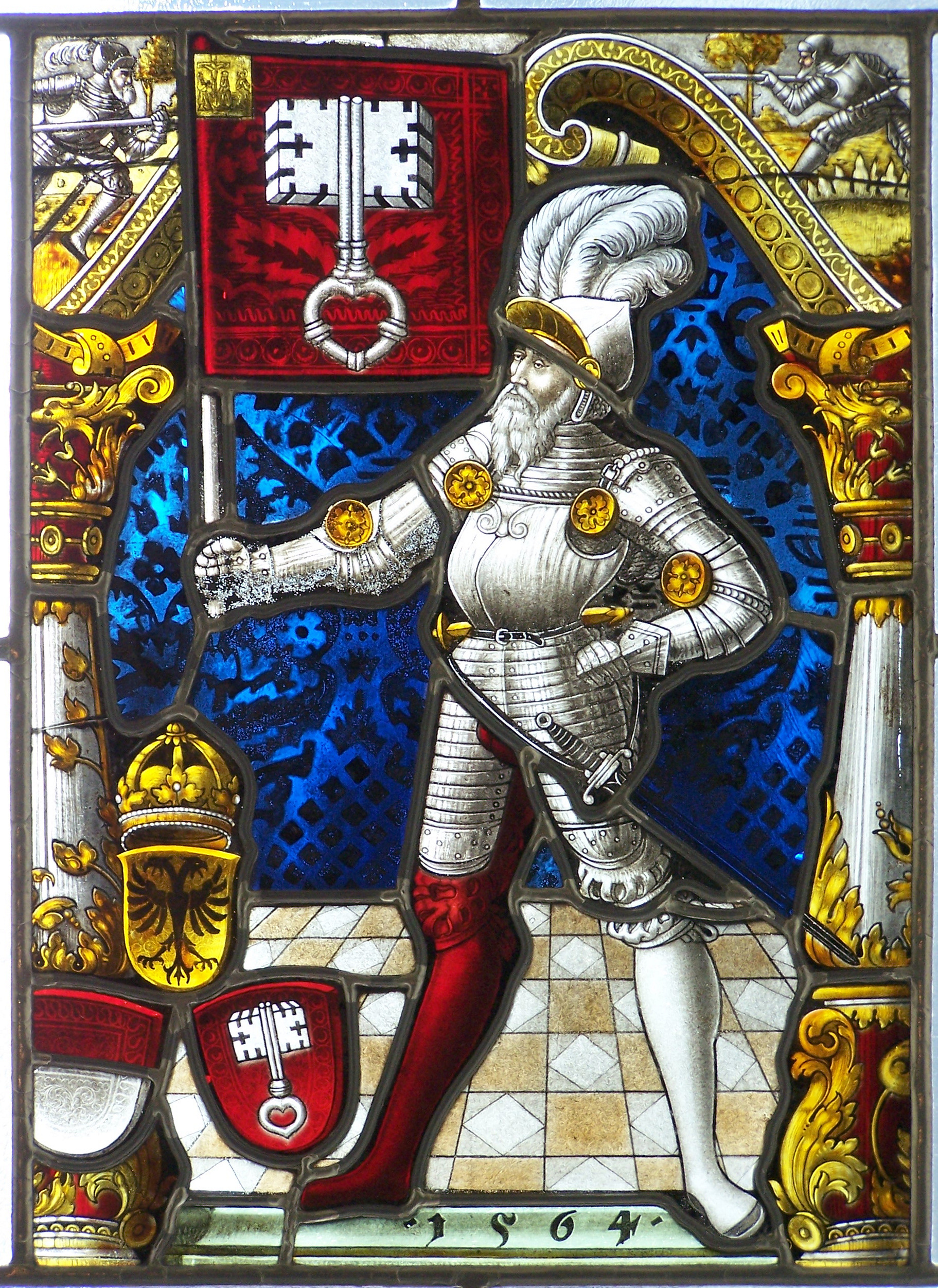
Swiss armorial glass of the Arms of Unterwalden, 1564, with typical painted details, extensive silver stain, Cousin's rose on the face, and flashed ruby glass with abraded white motif

=== Design ===
The first stage in the production of a window is to make, or acquire from the architect or owners of the building, an accurate template of the window opening that the glass is to fit.

The subject matter of the window is determined to suit the location, a particular theme, or the wishes of the patron. A small design called a Vidimus (from Latin "we have seen") is prepared which can be shown to the patron. A scaled model maquette may also be provided. The designer must take into account the design, the structure of the window, the nature and size of the glass available and their own preferred technique.

A traditional narrative window has panels which relate a story. A figurative window could have rows of saints or dignitaries. Scriptural texts or mottoes are sometimes included and perhaps the names of the patrons or the person to whose memory the window is dedicated. In a window of a traditional type, it is usually left to the discretion of the designer to fill the surrounding areas with borders, floral motifs and canopies.

A full-sized cartoon is drawn for every "light" (opening) of the window. A small church window might typically have two lights, with some simple tracery lights above. A large window might have four or five lights. The east or west window of a large cathedral might have seven lights in three tiers, with elaborate tracery. In medieval times the cartoon was drawn directly on the surface of a whitewashed table, which was then used as a pattern for cutting, painting and assembling the window. The cartoon is then divided into a patchwork, providing a template for each small glass piece. The exact position of the lead which holds the glass in place is also noted, as it is part of the calculated visual effect.

=== Selecting and painting the glass ===
Each piece of glass is selected for the desired colour and cut to match a section of the template. An exact fit is ensured by "grozing" the edges with a tool which can nibble off small pieces. Details of faces, hair and hands can be painted onto the inner surface of the glass using a special glass paint which contains finely ground lead or copper filings, ground glass, gum arabic and a medium such as wine, vinegar or (traditionally) urine. The art of painting details became increasingly elaborate and reached its height in the early 20th century.

From 1300 onwards, artists started using "silver stain" which was made with silver nitrate. It gave a yellow effect ranging from pale lemon to deep orange. It was usually painted onto the outside of a piece of glass, then fired to make it permanent. This yellow was particularly useful for enhancing borders, canopies and haloes, and turning blue glass into green glass. By about 1450, a stain known as "Cousin's rose" was used to enhance flesh tones.

In the 16th century, a range of glass stains were introduced, most of them coloured by ground glass particles. They were a form of enamelled glass. Painting on glass with these stains was initially used for small heraldic designs and other details. By the 17th century a style of stained glass had evolved that was no longer dependent upon the skilful cutting of coloured glass into sections. Scenes were painted onto glass panels of square format, like tiles. The colours were then annealed to the glass before the pieces were assembled.

A method used for embellishment and gilding is the decoration of one side of each of two pieces of thin glass, which are then placed back to back within the lead came. This allows for the use of techniques such as angel gilding and églomisé to produce an effect visible from both sides but not exposing the decorated surface to the atmosphere or mechanical damage.

=== Assembly and mounting ===
Once the glass is cut and painted, the pieces are assembled by slotting them into H-sectioned lead cames. All the joints are then soldered together and the glass pieces are prevented from rattling and the window made weatherproof by forcing a soft oily cement or mastic between the glass and the cames. Stained glass workers may be at higher risk of lead poisoning, due to repeated exposure to the lead cames. In modern windows, copper foil is now sometimes used instead of lead. For further technical details, see Came glasswork.

Traditionally, when a window was inserted into the window space, iron rods were put across it at various points to support its weight. The window was tied to these rods with lead strips or, more recently, with copper wires. Some very large early Gothic windows are divided into sections by heavy metal frames called ferramenta. This method of support was also favoured for large, usually painted, windows of the Baroque period.

Technical details

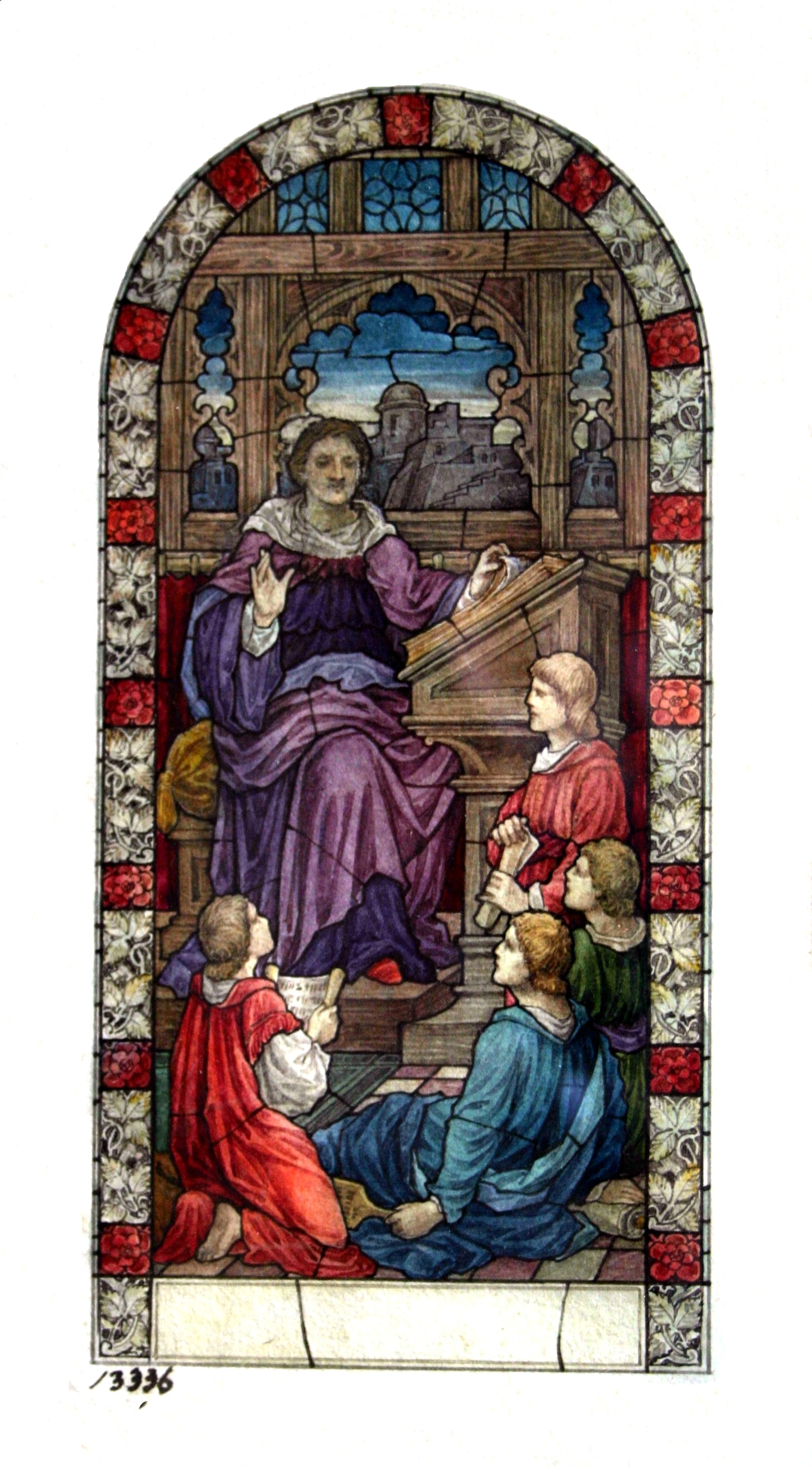
Maquette by Heaton, Butler and Bayne, 19th-century English manufacturers

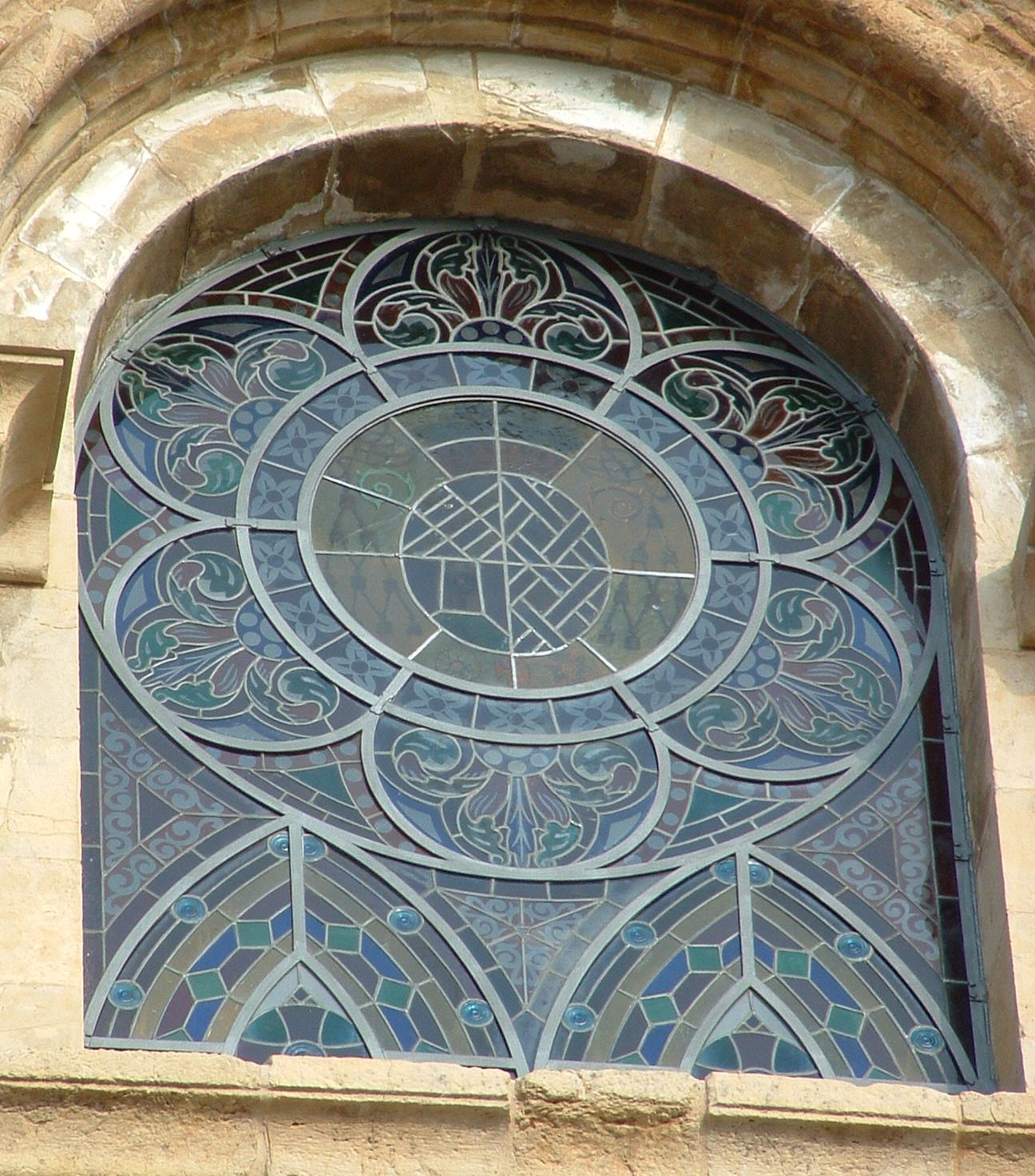
Exterior of a window at Sé Velha de Coimbra, Portugal, showing a modern steel armature

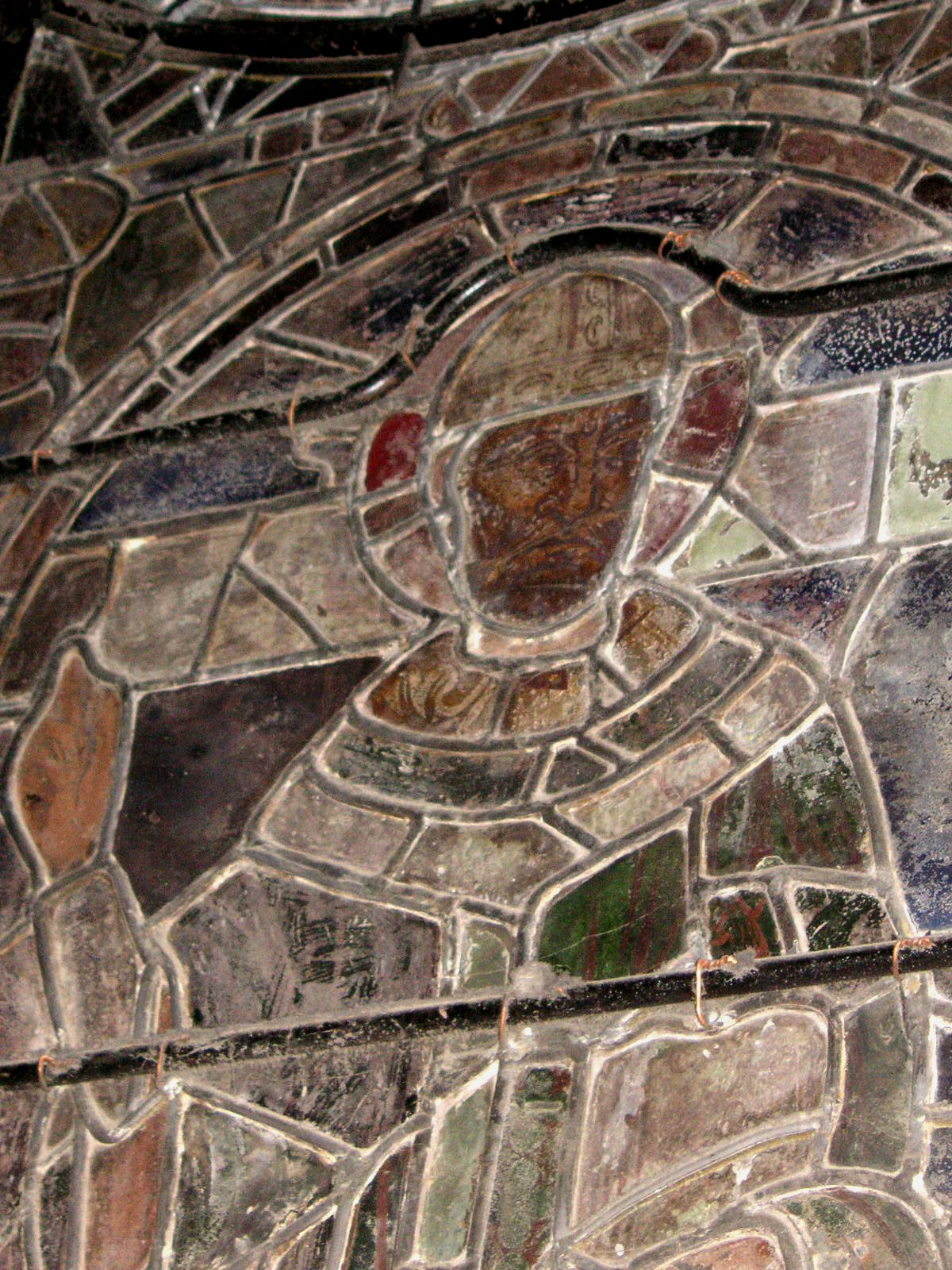
Thomas Becket window from Canterbury showing the pot metal and painted glass, lead H-sectioned cames, modern steel rods and copper wire attachments

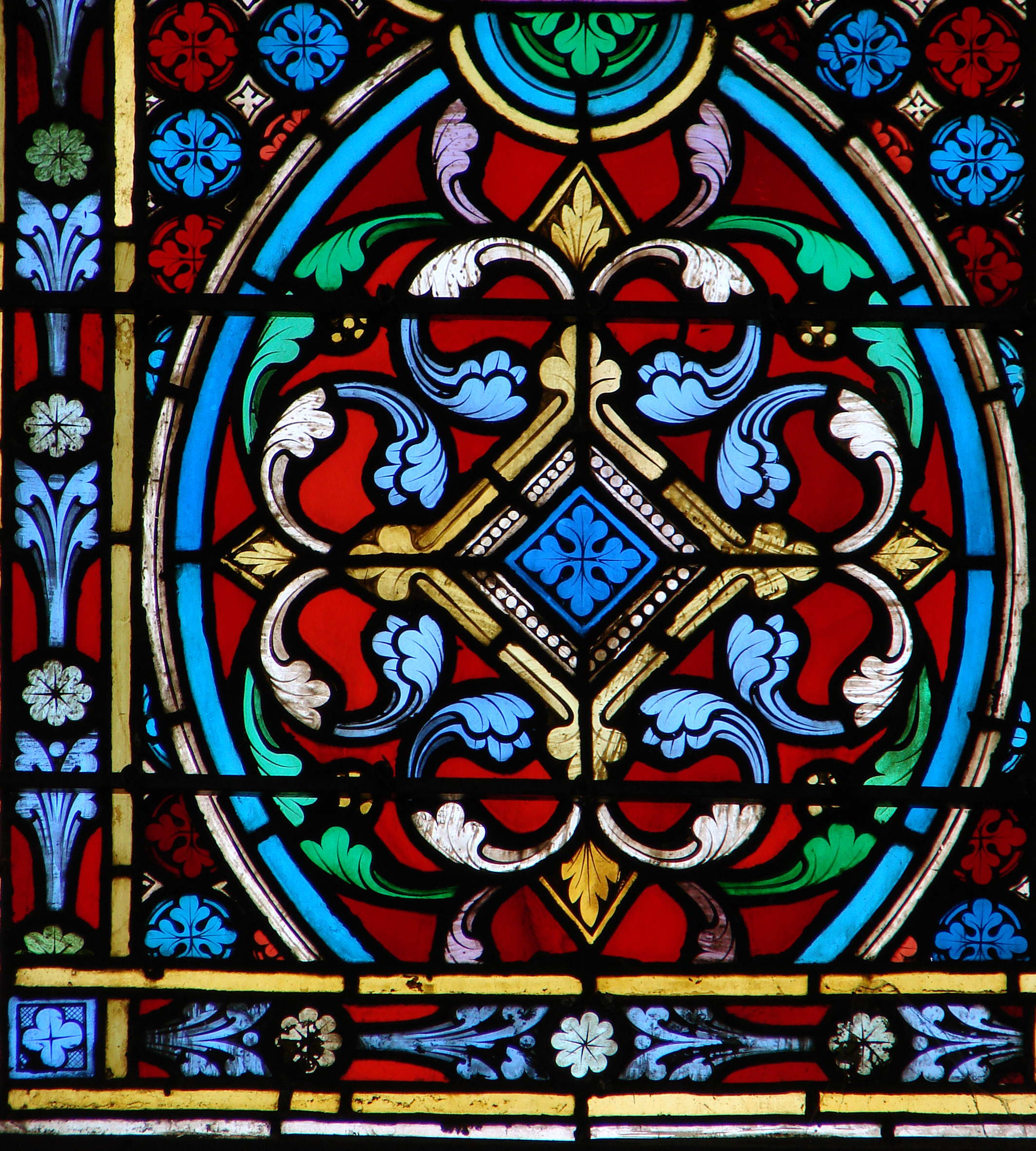
Skilled glass cutting and leading in a 19th-century window at Meaux Cathedral, France

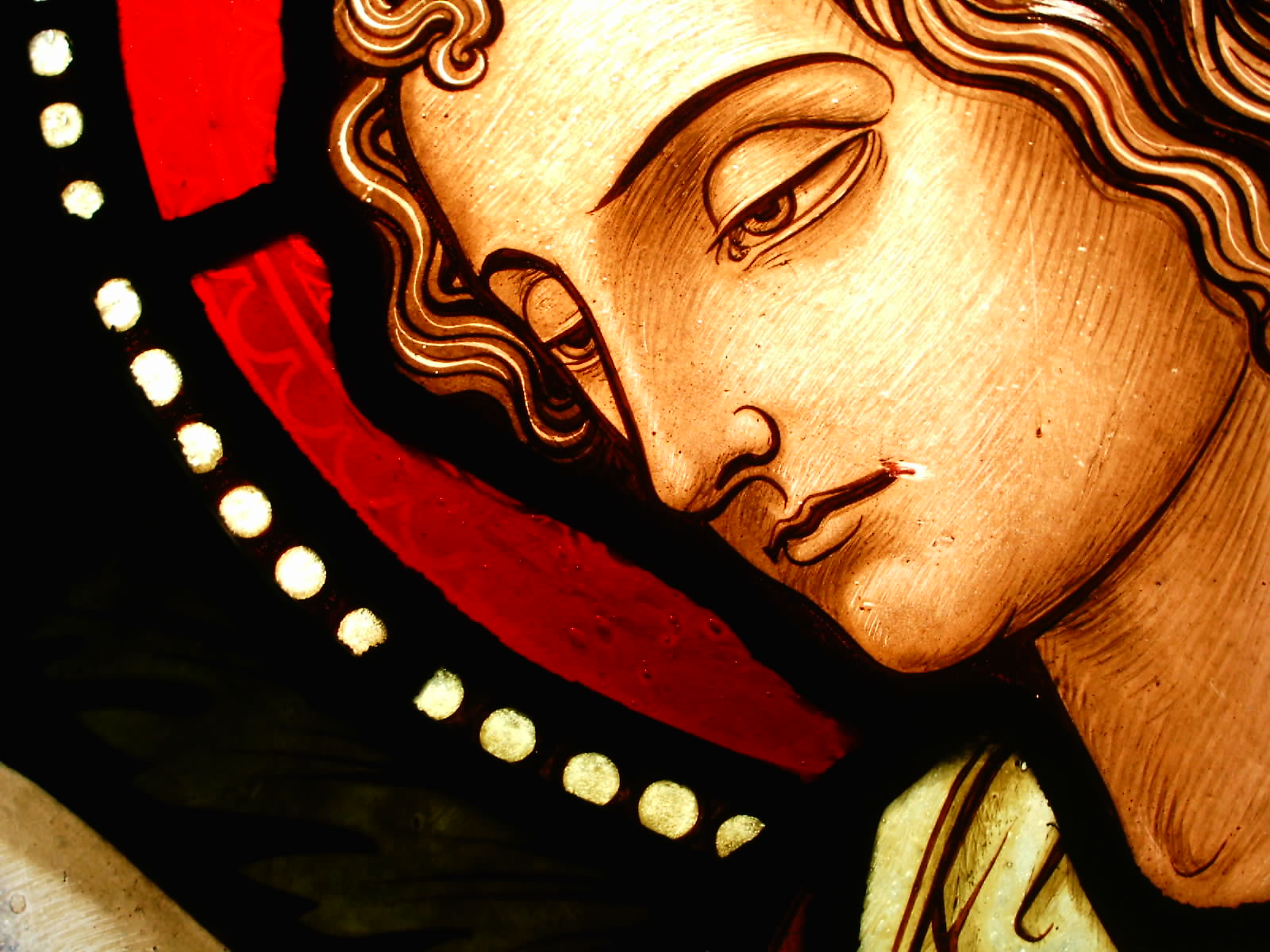
Detail from a 19th or 20th-century window in Eyneburg, Belgium, showing detailed polychrome painting of face

== History ==
=== Origins ===
Coloured glass has been produced since ancient times. Both the Egyptians and the Romans excelled at the manufacture of small colored glass objects. Phoenicia was important in glass manufacture with its chief centres Sidon, Tyre and Antioch. The British Museum holds two of the finest Roman glass pieces: the Lycurgus Cup, which is a murky mustard color without light but glows purple-red when lit from behind and green when lit from the front, and the cameo glass Portland vase, which is midnight blue with a carved white overlay.

In early Christian churches of the 4th and 5th centuries, there are many remaining windows which are filled with ornate patterns of thinly sliced alabaster set into wooden frames, giving a stained-glass like effect.

Evidence of stained-glass windows in churches and monasteries in Britain can be found as early as the 7th century. The earliest known reference dates from 675 AD when Benedict Biscop imported workmen from France to glaze the windows of the monastery of St Peter which he was building at Monkwearmouth. Hundreds of pieces of coloured glass and lead, dating back to the late 7th century, have been discovered here and at Jarrow.

In the Middle East, the glass industry of Syria continued during the Islamic period with major centres of manufacture at Raqqa, Aleppo and Damascus and the most important products being highly transparent colourless glass and gilded glass, rather than coloured glass.

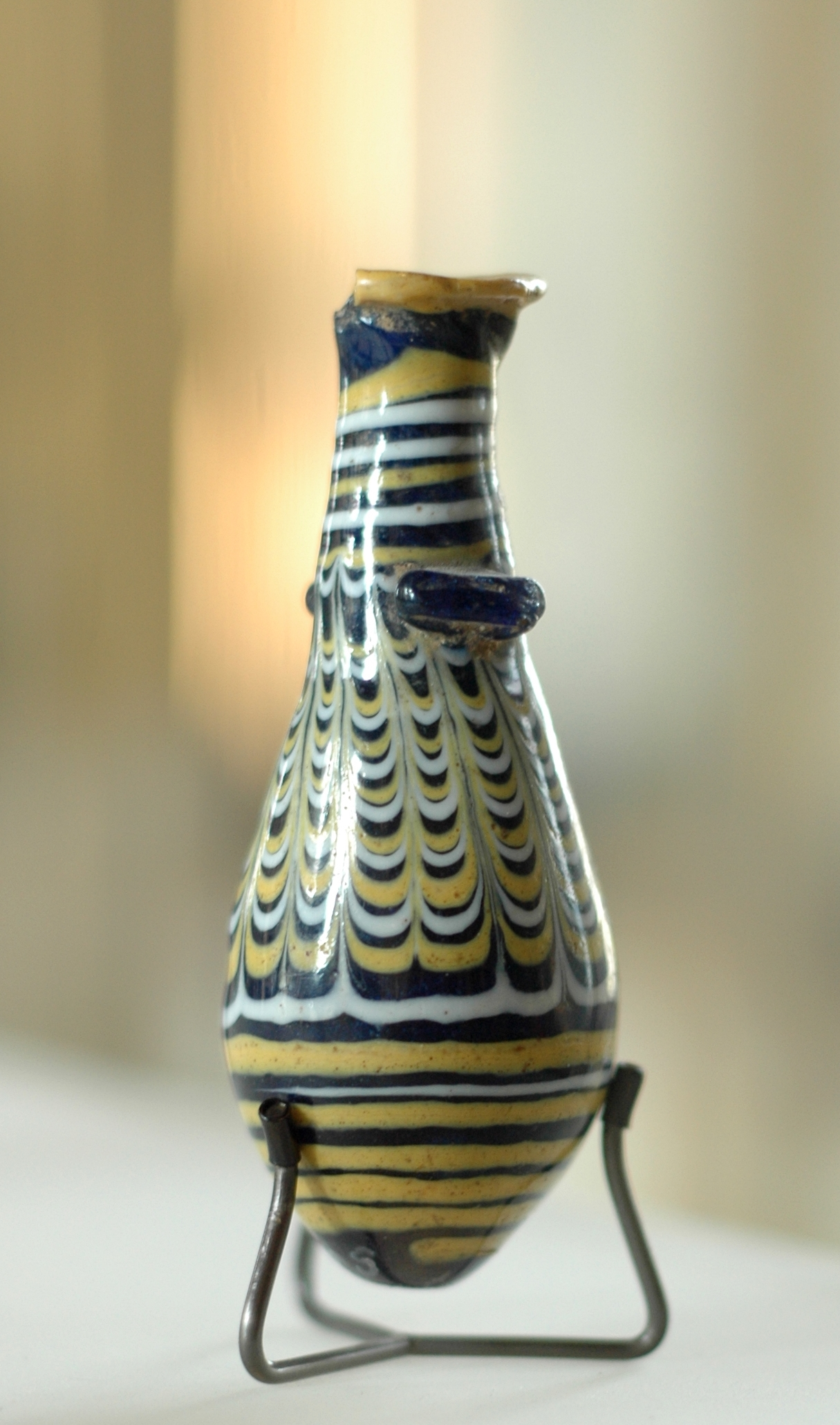
A perfume flask from 100 BC to 200 AD

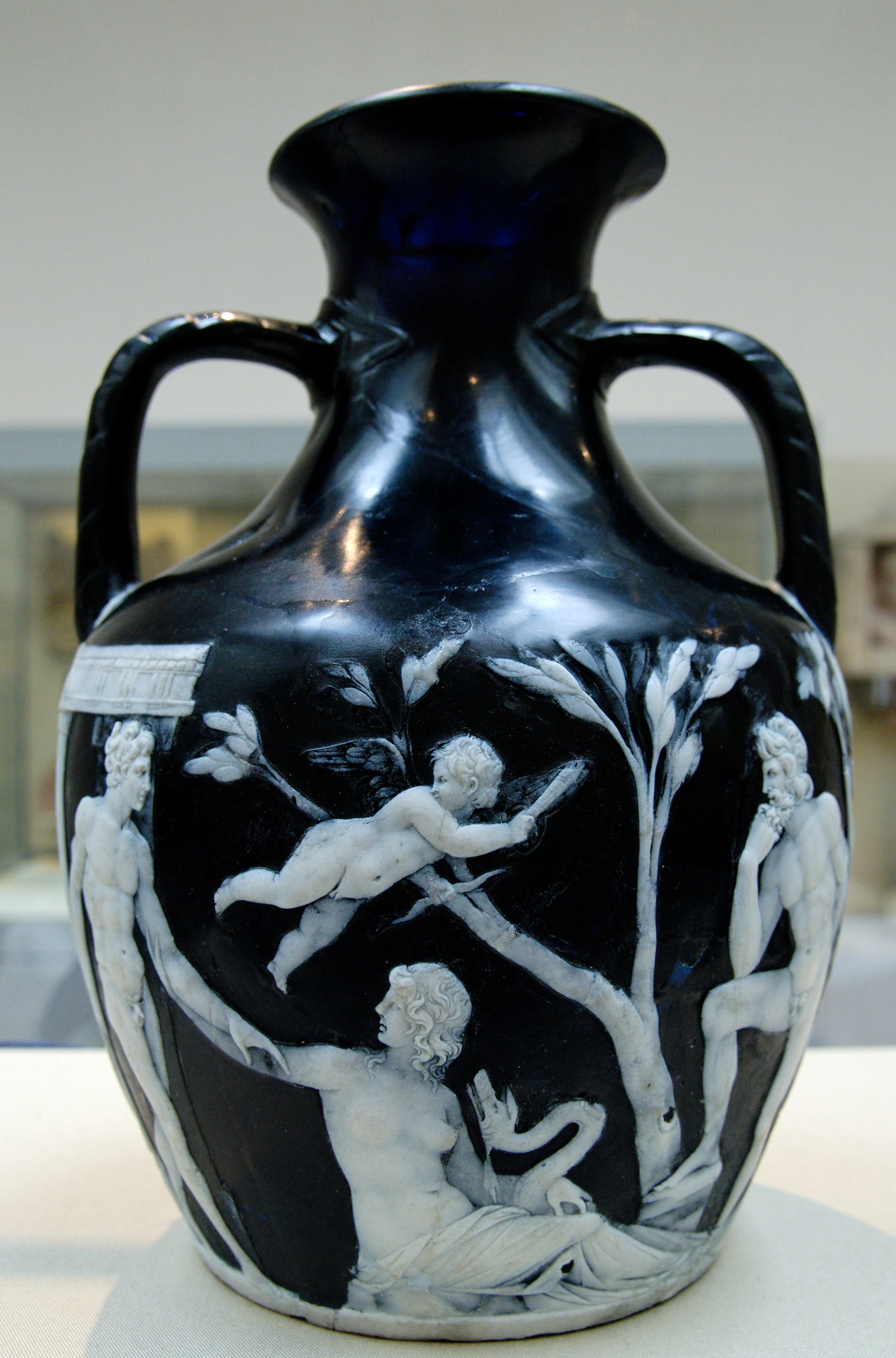
The Portland Vase, a rare example of Roman flashed glass

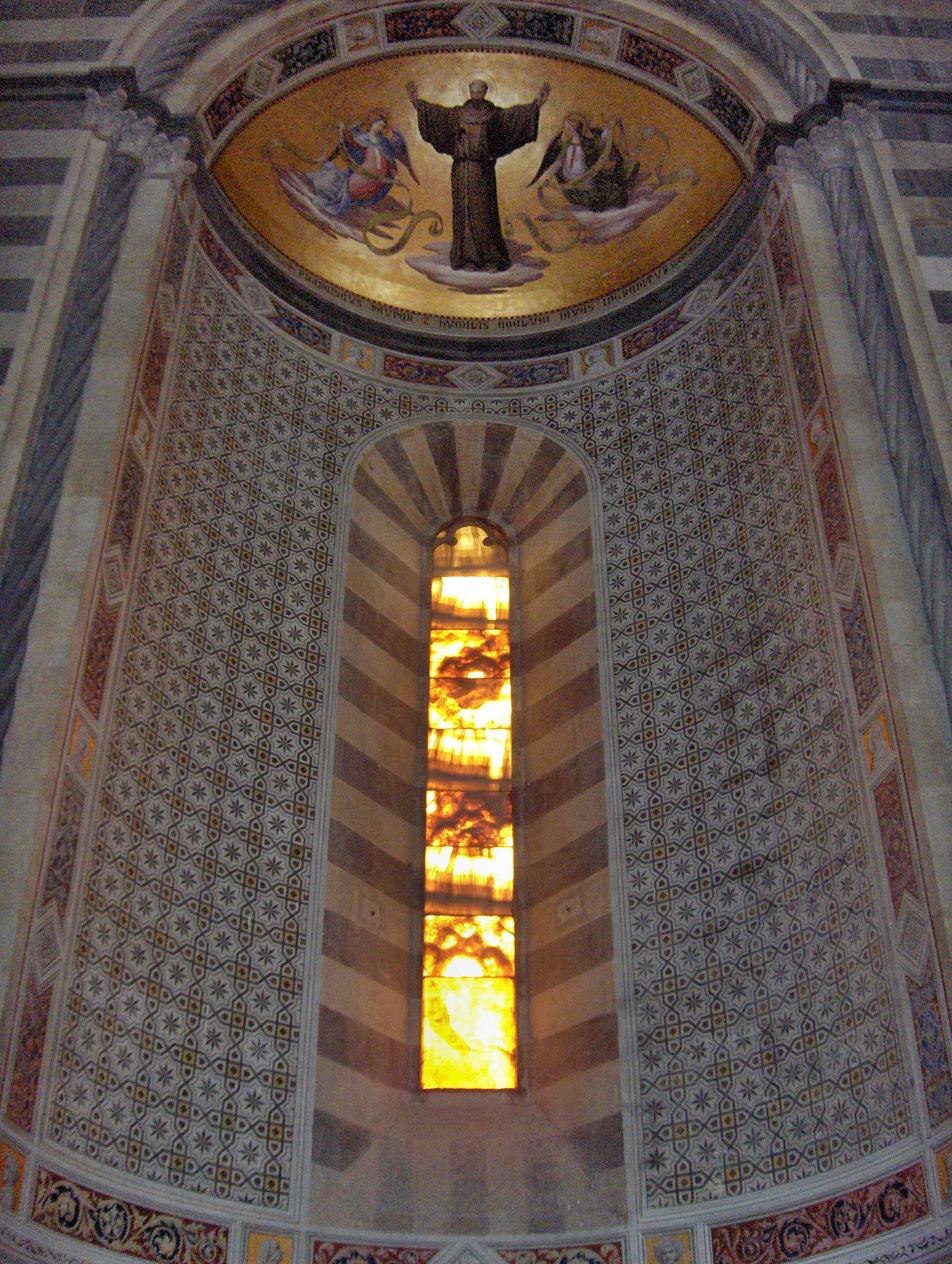
An alabaster window in Orvieto Cathedral, Italy

=== In West Asia ===
The creation of stained glass in West Asia began in ancient times. One of the region's earliest surviving formulations for the production of colored glass comes from the Assyrian city of Nineveh, dating to the 7th-century BC. The Kitab al-Durra al-Maknuna, attributed to the 8th century alchemist Jābir ibn Hayyān, discusses the production of colored glass in ancient Babylon and Egypt. The Kitab al-Durra al-Maknuna also describes how to create colored glass and artificial gemstones made from high-quality stained glass. The tradition of stained glass manufacture has continued, with mosques, palaces, and public spaces being decorated with stained glass throughout the Islamic world. The stained glass of Islam is generally non-pictorial and of purely geometric design, but may contain both floral motifs and text.

Stained glass creation flourished in Iran during the Safavid dynasty (1501–1736 A.D.) and Zand dynasty (1751–1794 A.D.). In Iran, stained glass sash windows are called Orosi windows (also transliterated as Arasi or Orsi), and were once used for decoration, as well as controlling the incoming sunlight in the hot and semi-arid climate.

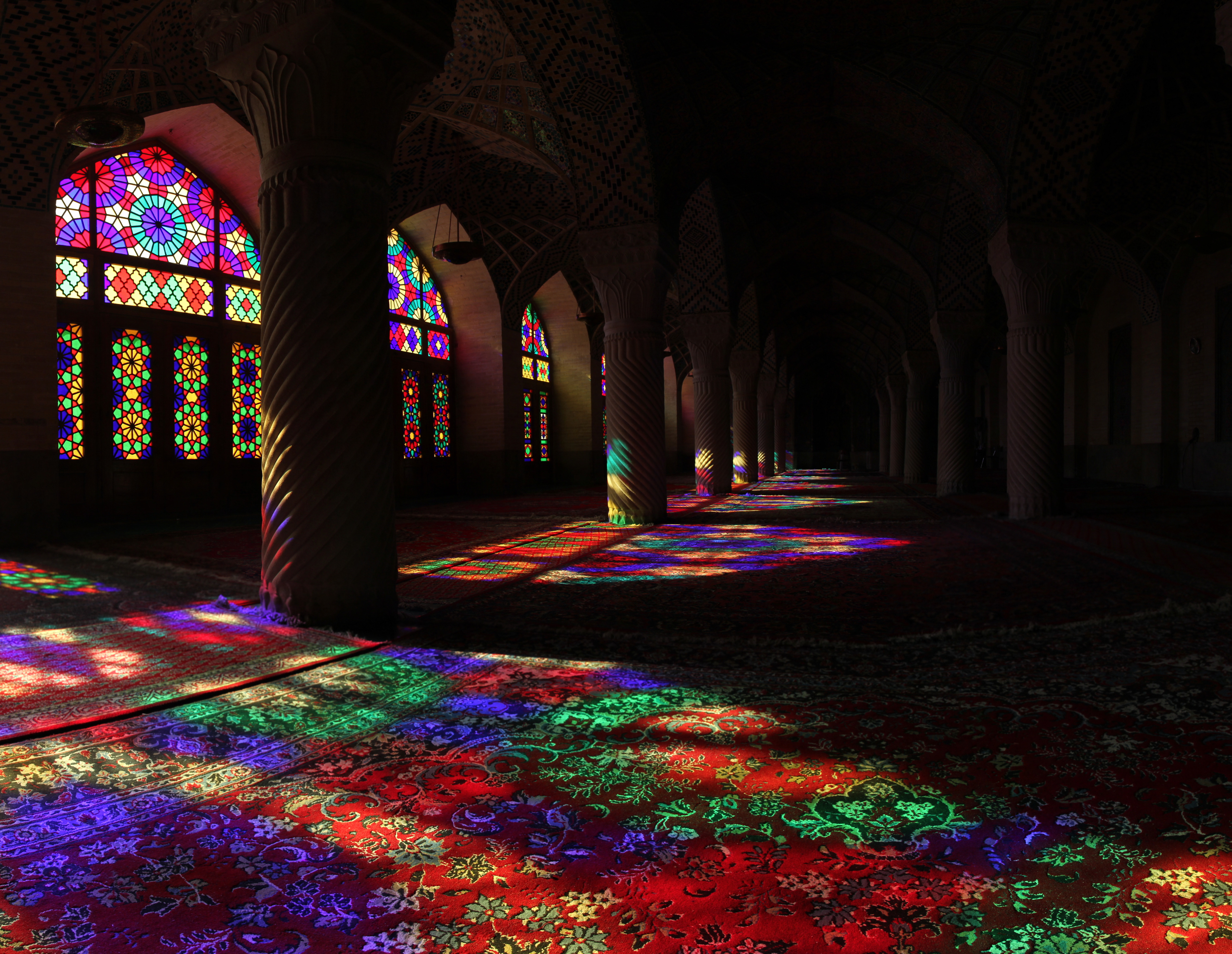
Extensive stained glasses of Nasir-ol-Molk Mosque in Shiraz, Iran, and the light passing through them

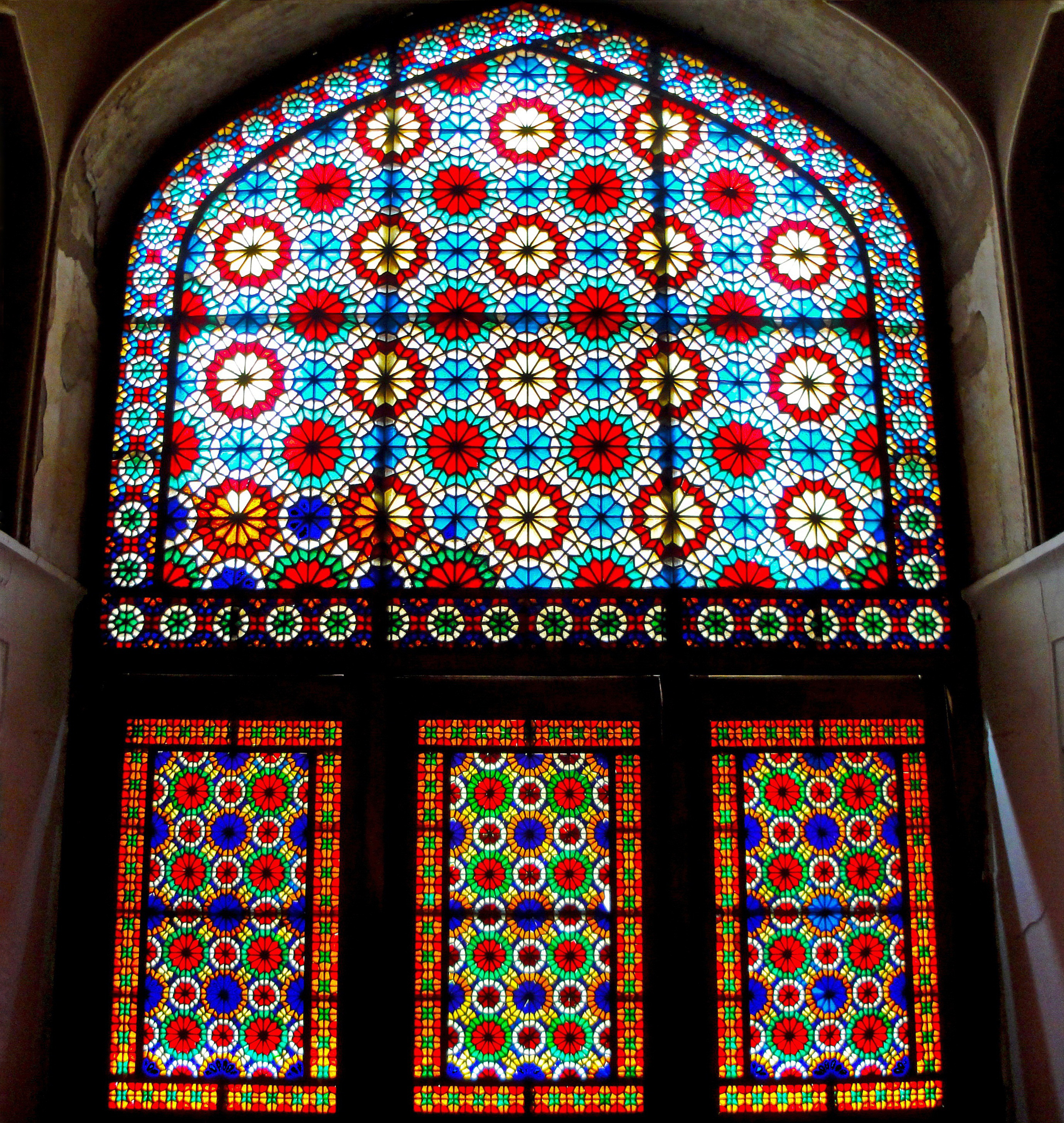
Stained glass at Dowlat Abad Garden in Yazd, Iran

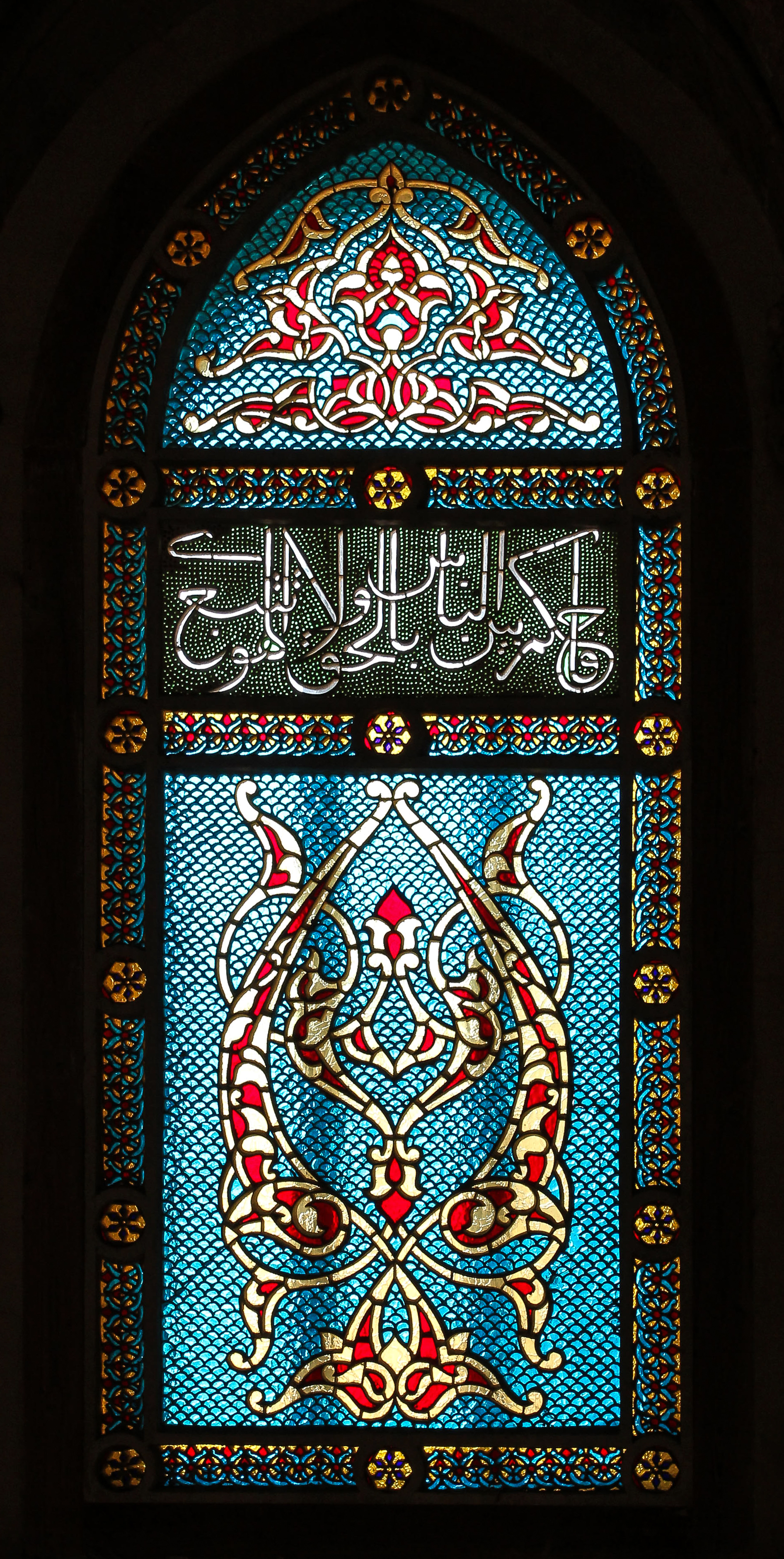
From a mosque in Jerusalem, this window contains highly detailed text.

=== Medieval glass in Europe ===
Stained glass, as an art form, reached its height in the Middle Ages when it became a major pictorial form used to illustrate the narratives of the Bible to a largely illiterate populace.

In the Romanesque and Early Gothic period, from about 950 to 1240, the untraceried windows demanded large expanses of glass which of necessity were supported by robust iron frames, such as may be seen at Chartres Cathedral and at the eastern end of Canterbury Cathedral. As Gothic architecture developed into a more ornate form, windows grew larger, affording greater illumination to the interiors, but were divided into sections by vertical shafts and tracery of stone. This elaboration of form reached its height of complexity in the Flamboyant style in Europe, and windows grew still larger with the development of the Perpendicular style in England and Rayonnant style in France.

Integrated with the lofty verticals of Gothic cathedrals and parish churches, glass designs became more daring. The circular form, or rose window, developed in France from relatively simple windows with openings pierced through slabs of thin stone to wheel windows, as exemplified by the west front of Chartres Cathedral, and ultimately to designs of enormous complexity, the tracery being drafted from hundreds of different points, such as those at Sainte-Chapelle, Paris and the "Bishop's Eye" at Lincoln Cathedral.

While stained glass was widely manufactured, Chartres was the greatest centre of stained glass manufacture, producing glass of unrivalled quality.

Medieval glass in France

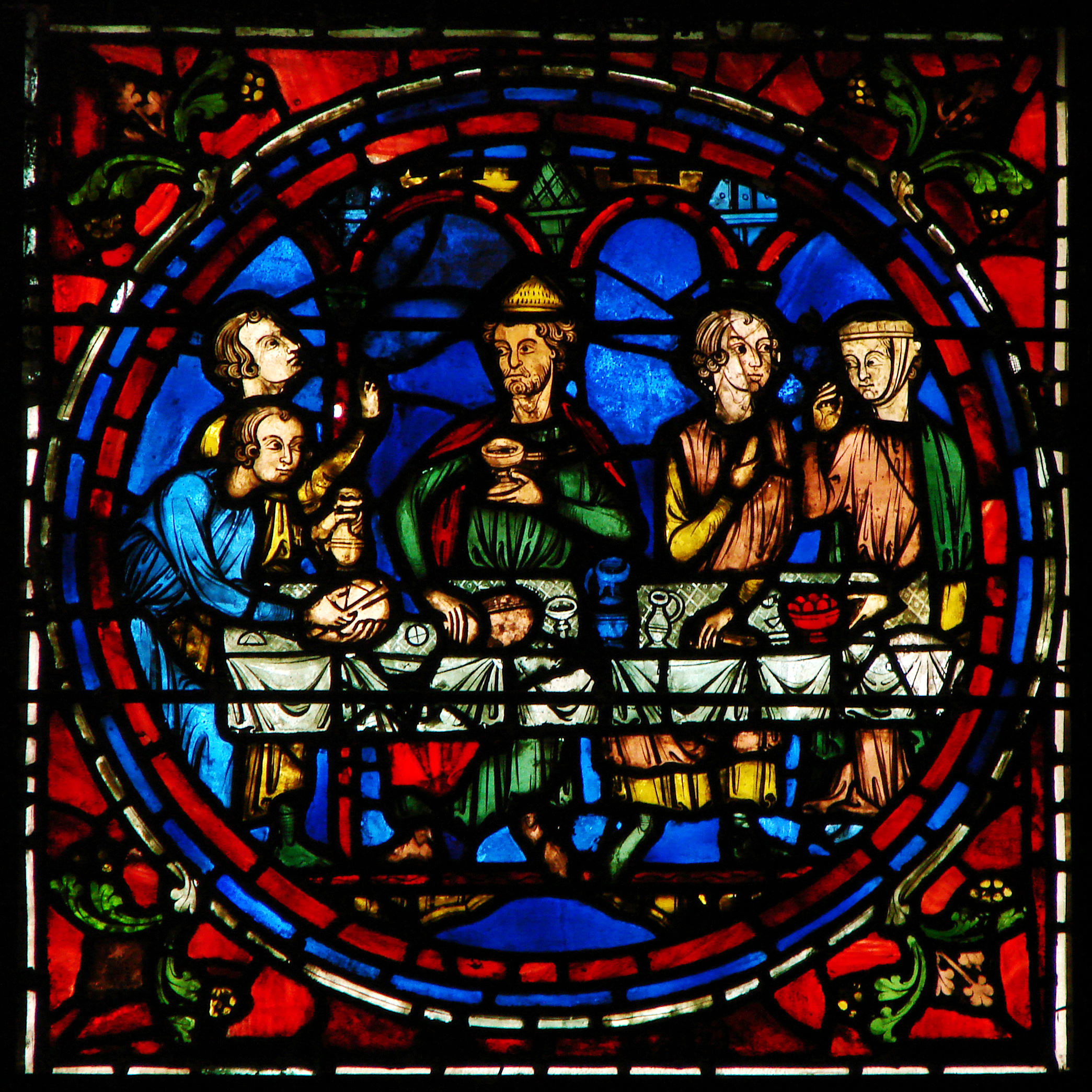
Detail of a 13th-century window from Chartres Cathedral

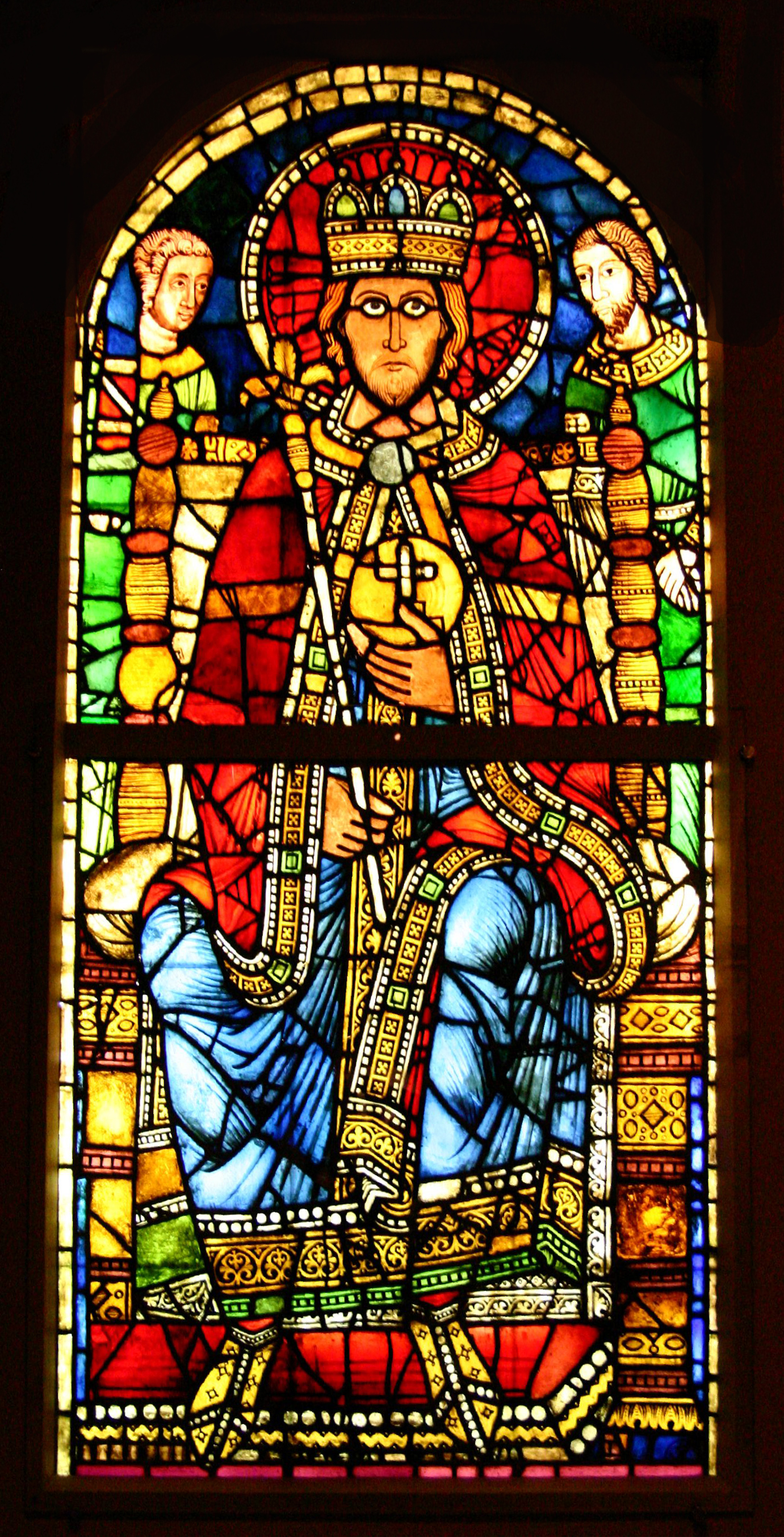
Charlemagne from a Romanesque window in Strasbourg Cathedral

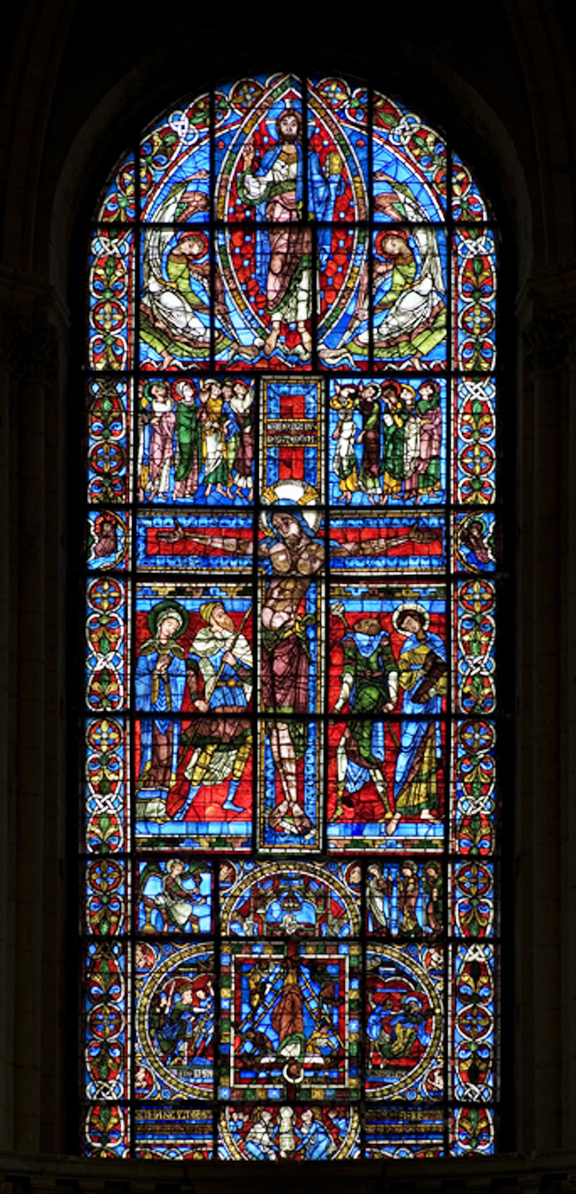
The Crucifixion window of Poitiers Cathedral

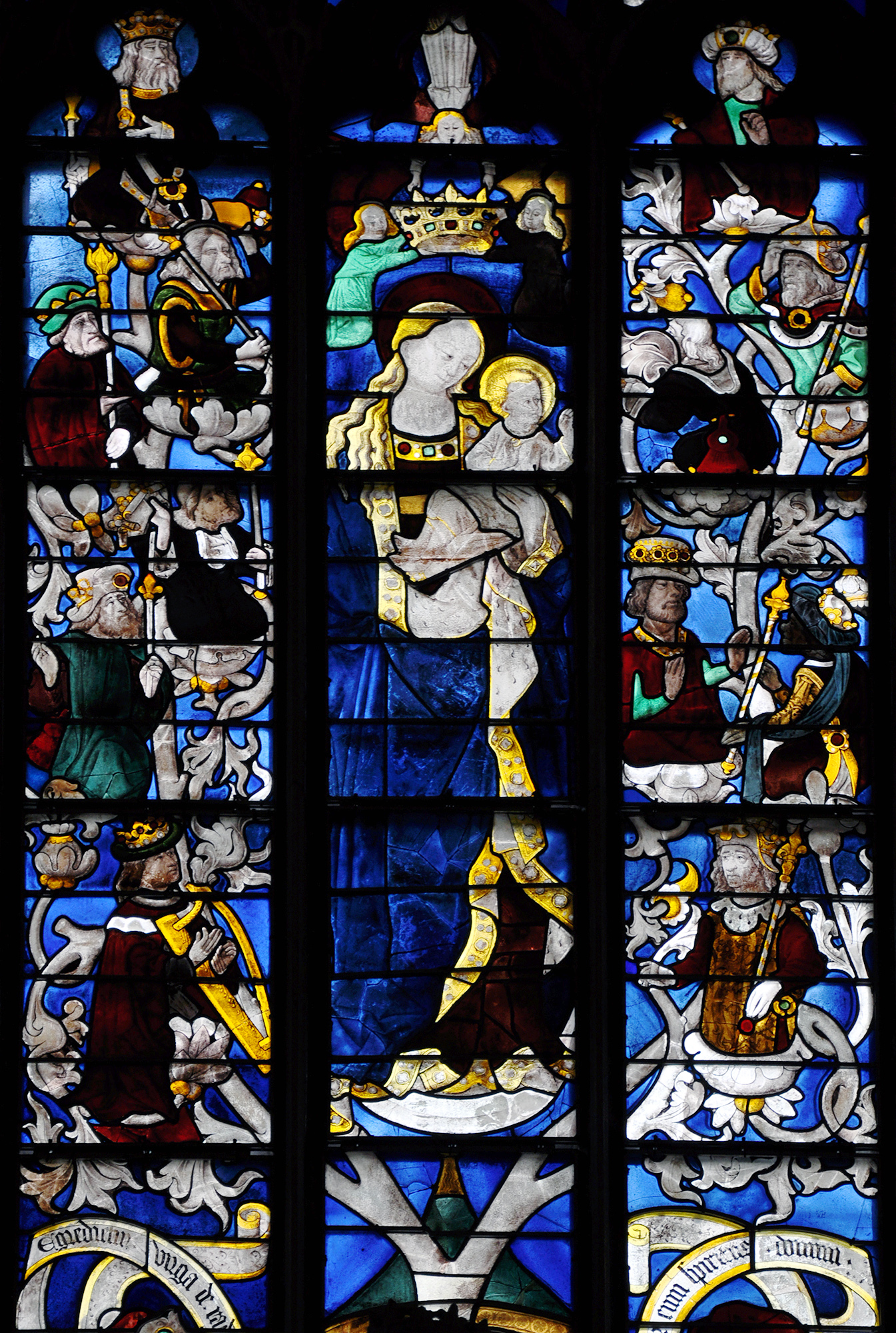
Late Gothic Tree of Jesse window from Evreux Cathedral

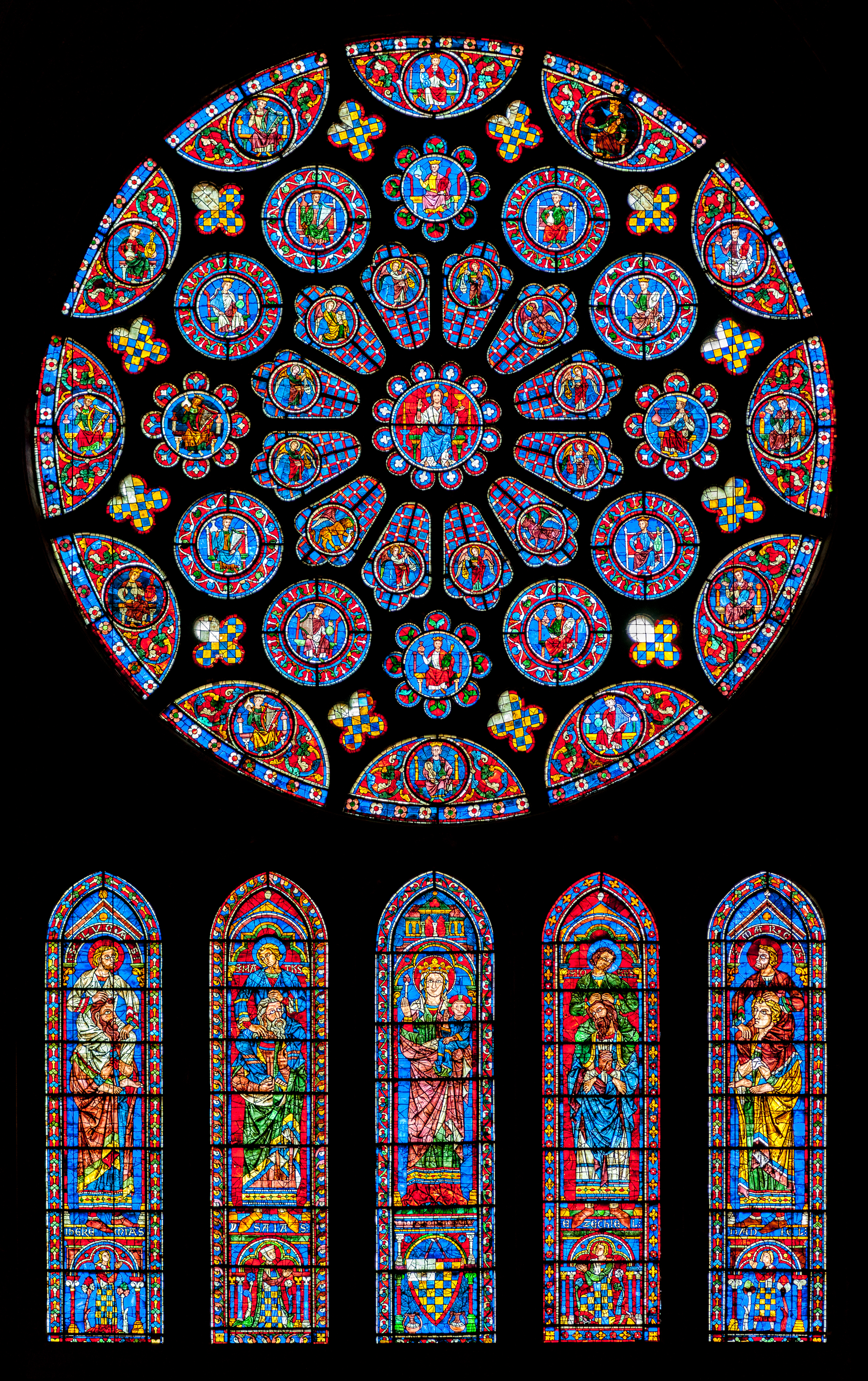
The south transept windows from Chartres Cathedral
Medieval glass in Germany and Austria

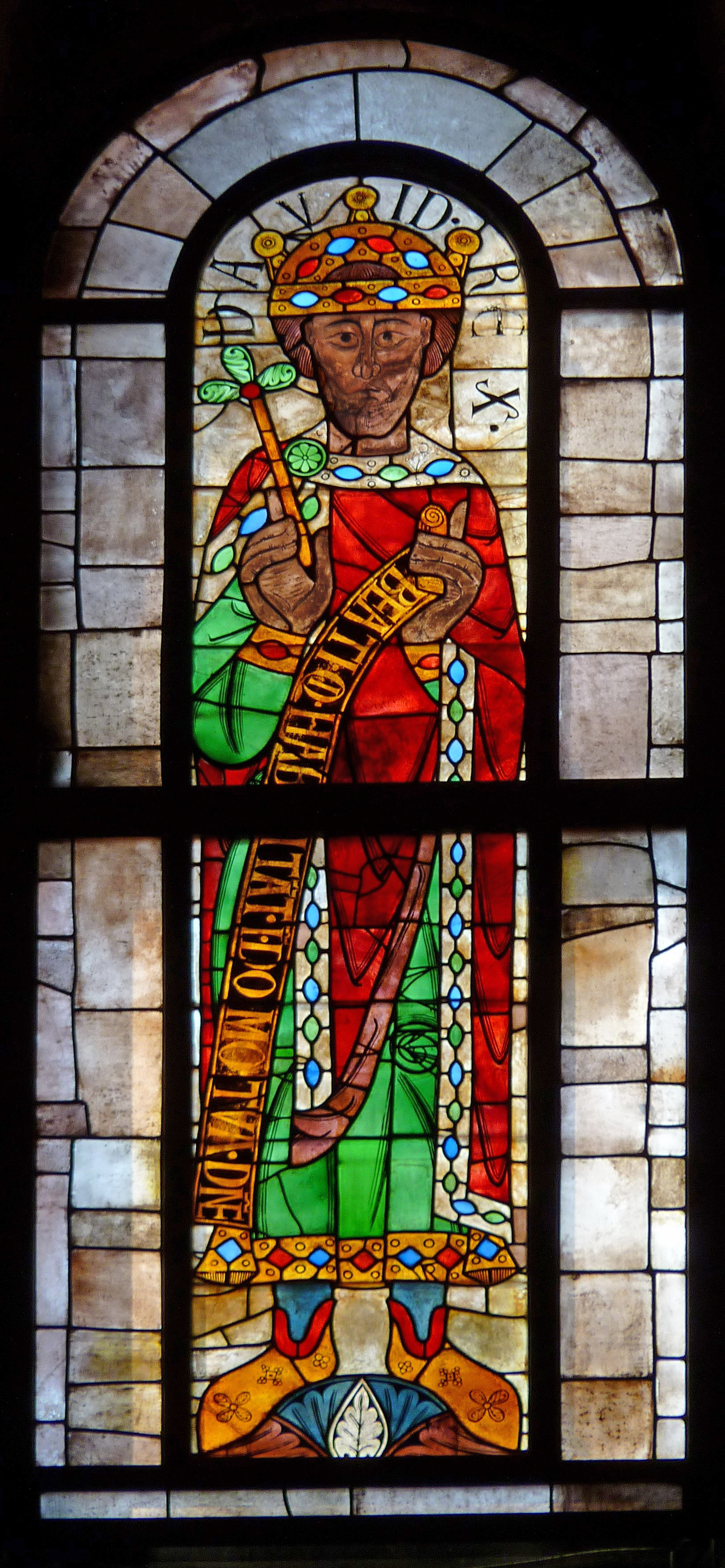
King David from Augsburg Cathedral (early 12th century). One of the oldest examples in situ.

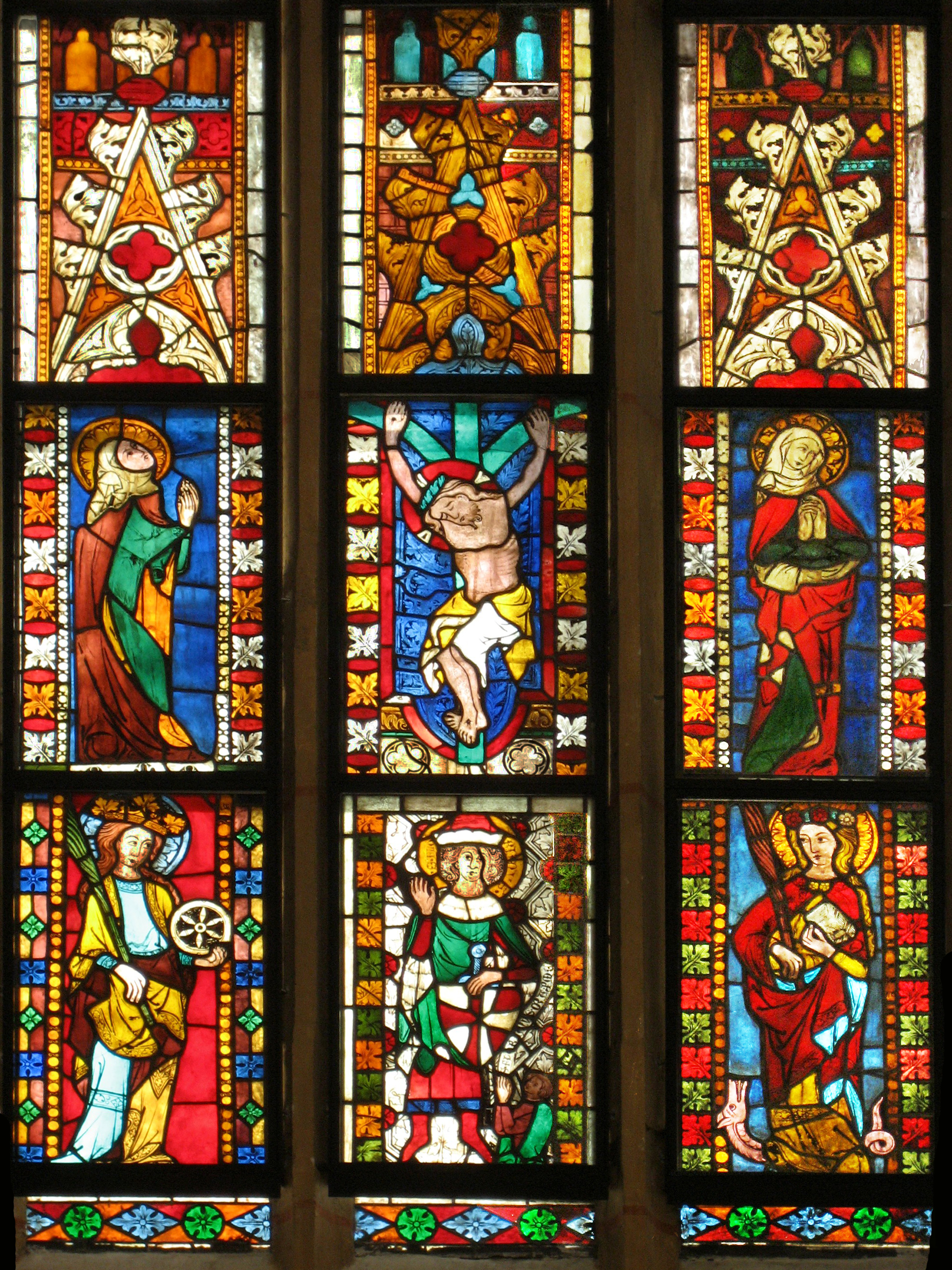
Crucifixion with Ss Catherine, George and Margaret, Leechkirche, Graz, Austria

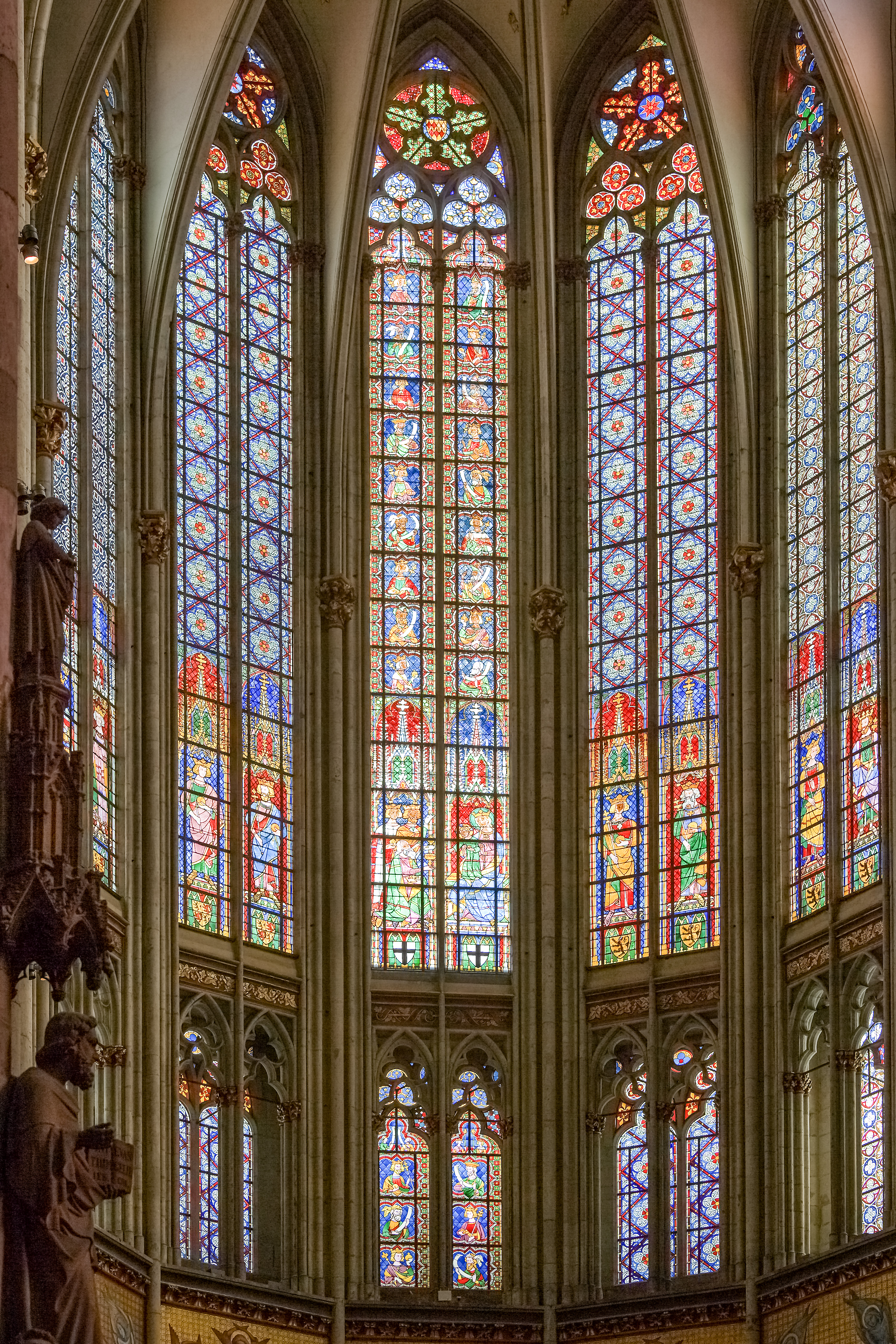
The windows of the choir of Cologne Cathedral (early 14th century)

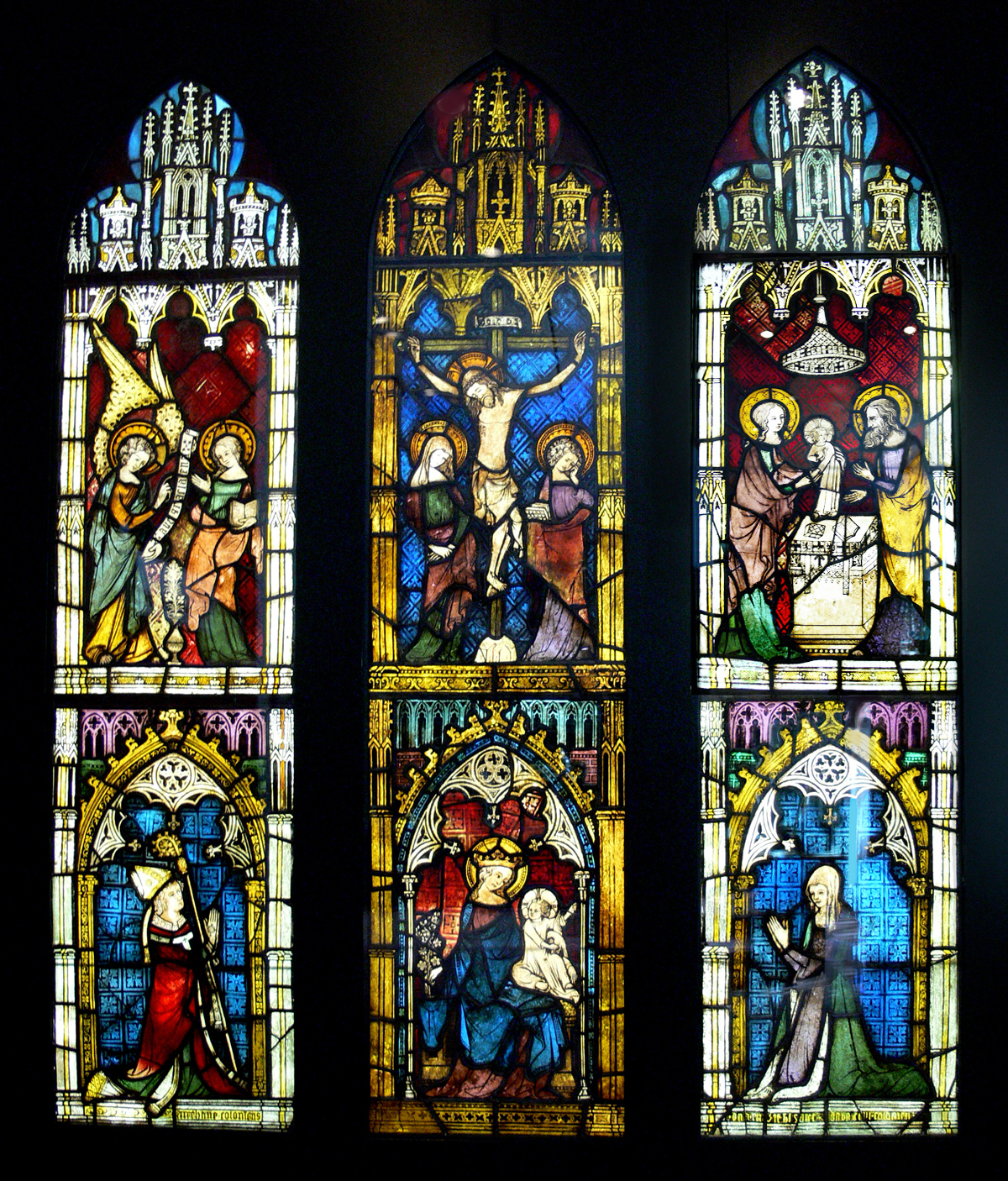
The Crucifixion and Virgin and Child in Majesty, Cologne Cathedral (1340)

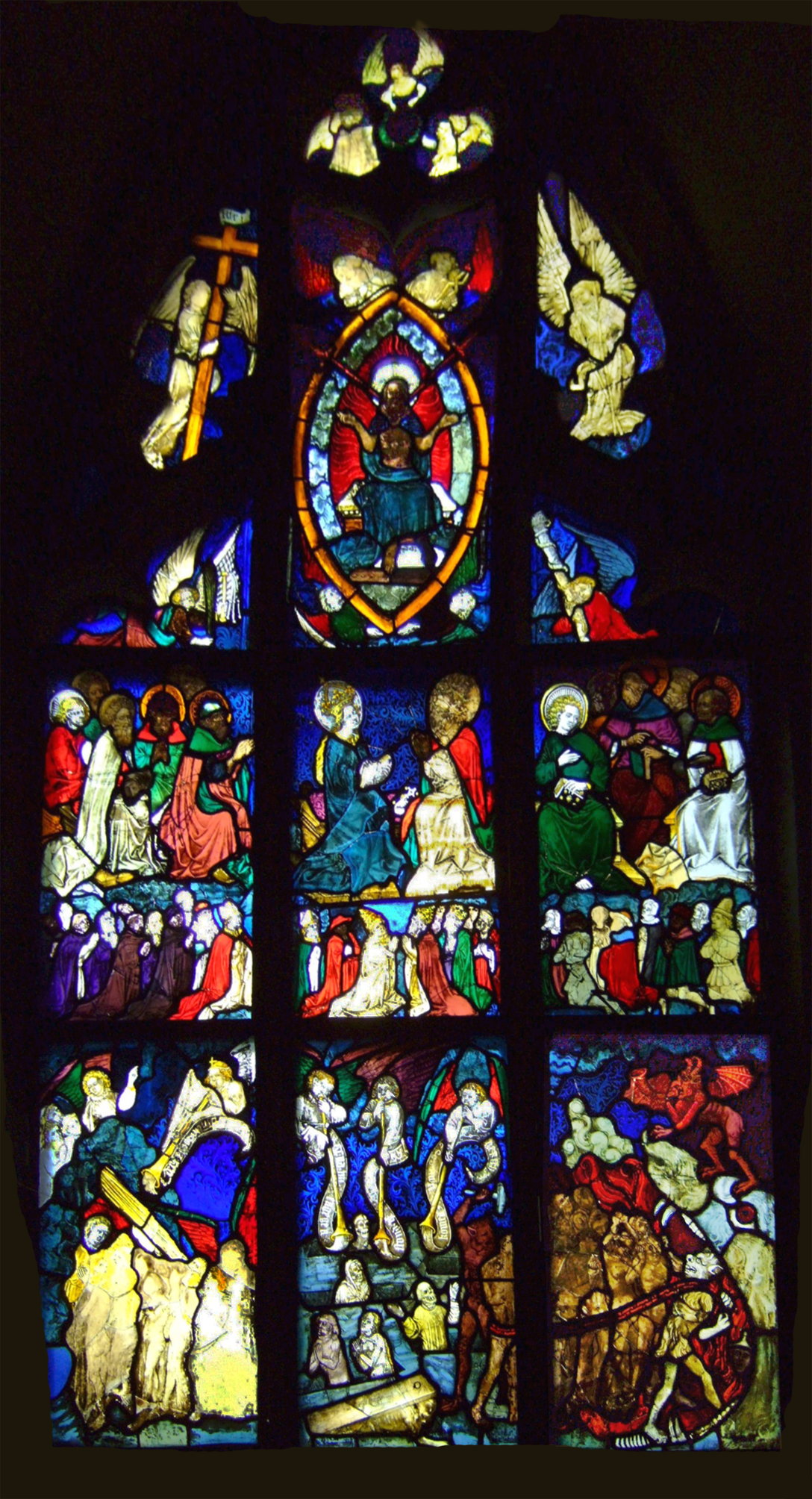
Ulm Munster, The Last Judgement by Hans Acker (1430)
Medieval glass in England

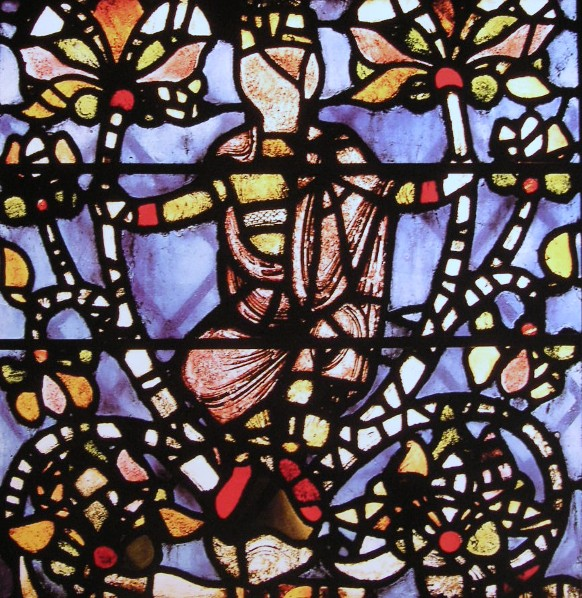
Detail of a Tree of Jesse from York Minster (c. 1170), the oldest stained-glass window in England

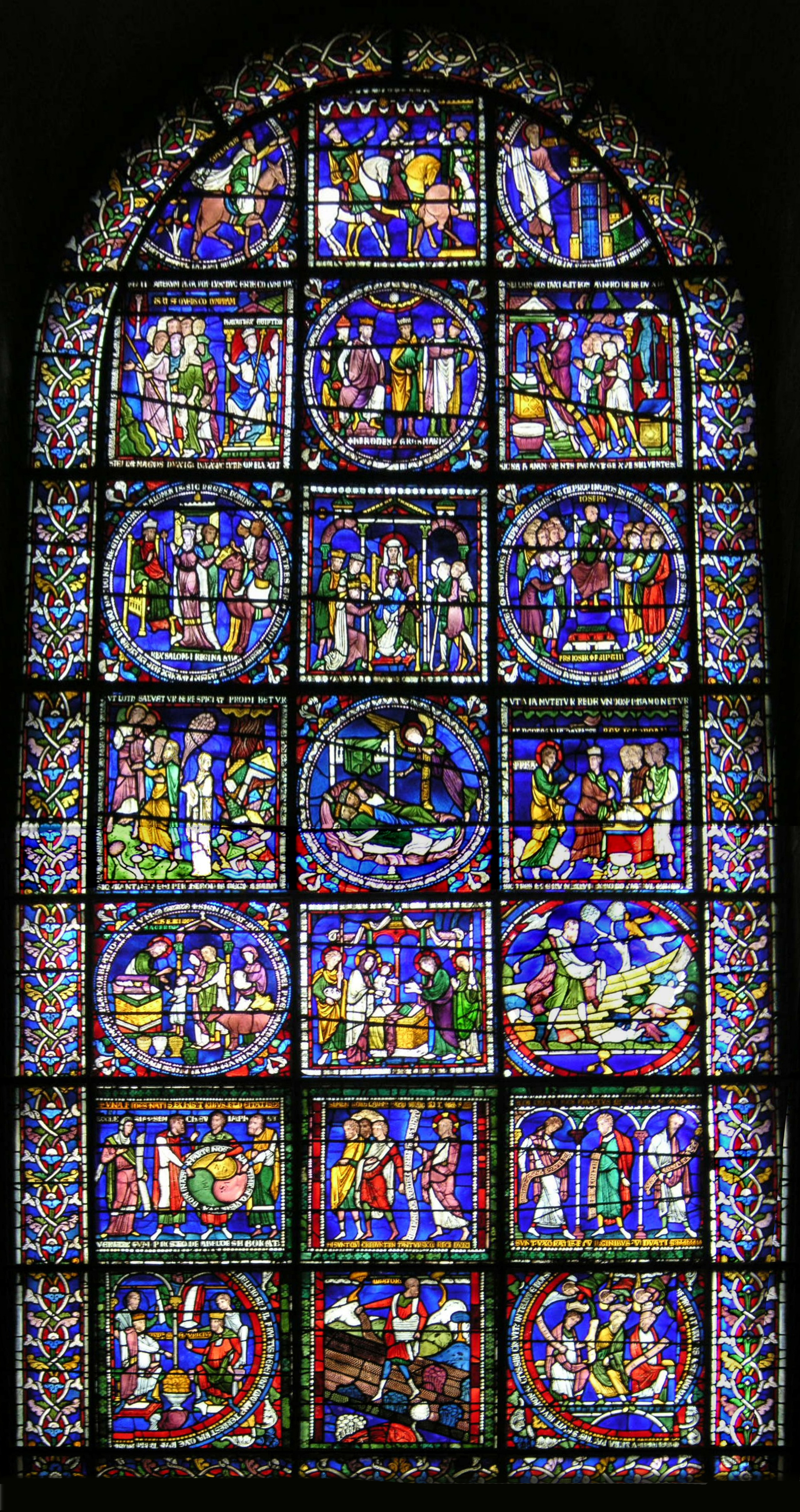
The Poor Man's Bible window from Canterbury Cathedral (13th century)

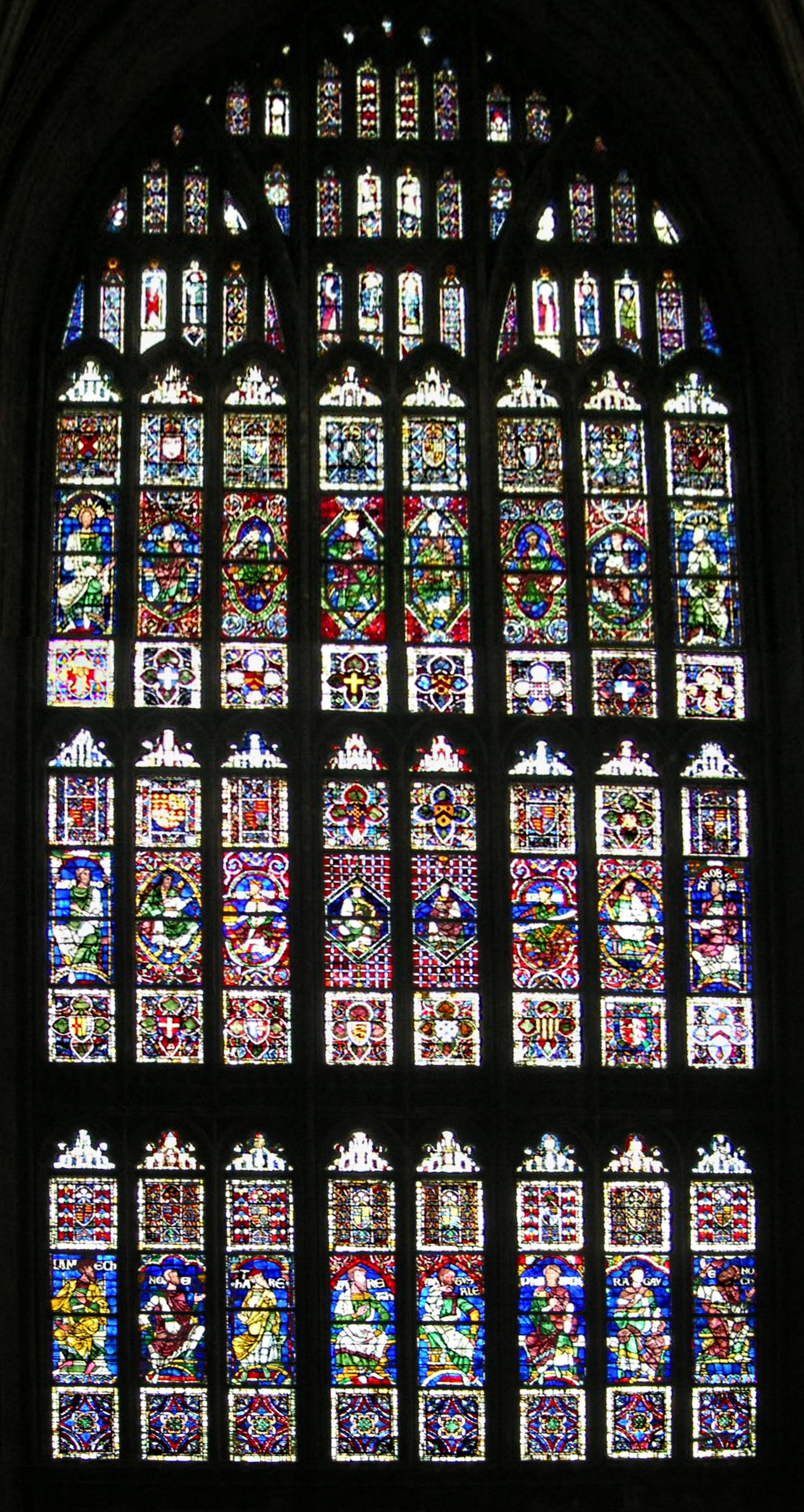
South transept window at Canterbury Cathedral (13th century)

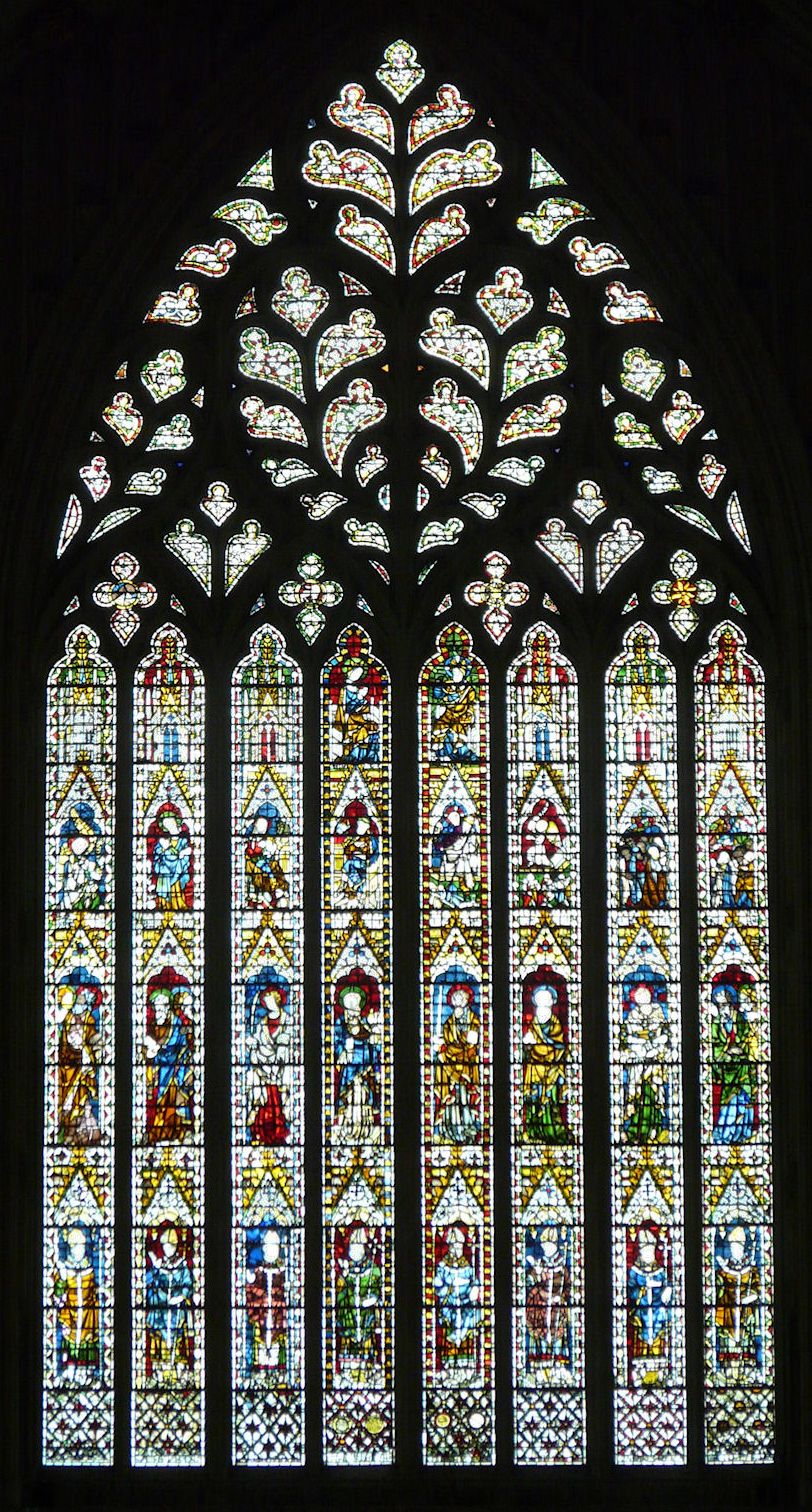
The west window of York Minster (1338–39)

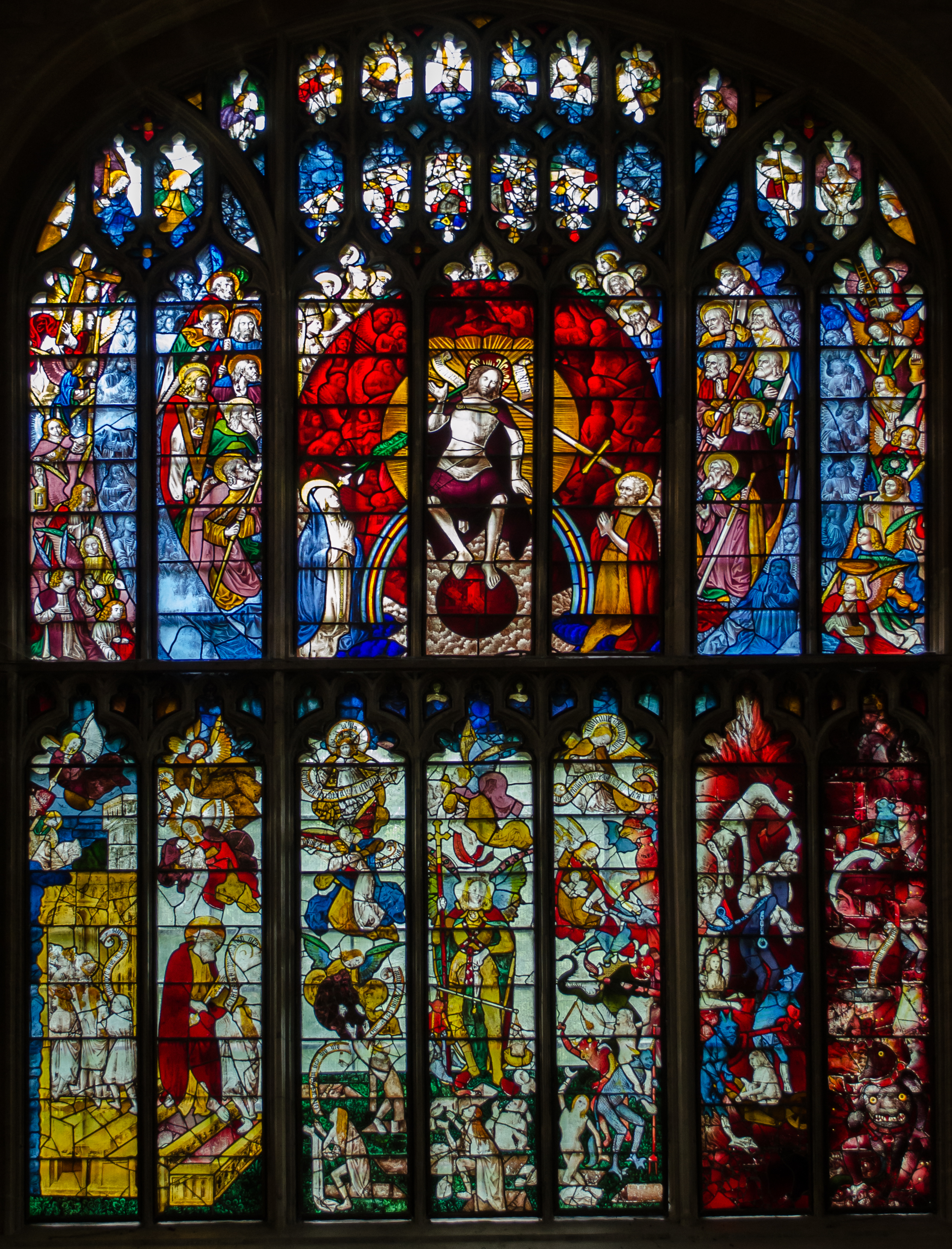
The Last Judgement, St Mary's Church, Fairford, Barnard Flower (1500–17)

=== Renaissance, Reformation and Classical windows ===
Probably the earliest scheme of stained-glass windows that was created during the Renaissance was that for Florence Cathedral, devised by Lorenzo Ghiberti. The scheme includes three ocular windows for the dome and three for the facade which were designed from 1405 to 1445 by several of the most renowned artists of this period: Ghiberti, Donatello, Uccello and Andrea del Castagno. Each major ocular window contains a single picture drawn from the Life of Christ or the Life of the Virgin Mary, surrounded by a wide floral border, with two smaller facade windows by Ghiberti showing the martyred deacons, St Stephen and St Lawrence. One of the cupola windows has since been lost, and that by Donatello has lost nearly all of its painted details.

In Europe, stained glass continued to be produced; the style evolved from the Gothic to the Classical, which is well represented in Germany, Belgium and the Netherlands, despite the rise of Protestantism. In France, much glass of this period was produced at the Limoges factory, and in Italy at Murano, where stained glass and faceted lead crystal are often coupled together in the same window. The French Revolution brought about the neglect or destruction of many windows in France. Nonetheless, the country still holds the largest set of Renaissance stained glass in its churches, particularly in the regions of Normandy and Champagne where there were vivid ateliers in many cities until the early 17th century with the stained glass painter Linard Gonthier being active in Troyes until 1642. There are 1042 preserved 16th-century windows in the Aube department alone.

At the Reformation in England, large numbers of medieval and Renaissance windows were smashed and replaced with plain glass. The Dissolution of the Monasteries under Henry VIII and the injunctions of Thomas Cromwell against "abused images" (the object of veneration) resulted in the loss of thousands of windows. Few remain undamaged; of these the windows in the private chapel at Hengrave Hall in Suffolk are among the finest. With the latter wave of destruction the traditional methods of working with stained glass died, and were not rediscovered in England until the early 19th century. See Stained glass – British glass, 1811–1918 for more details.

In the Netherlands a rare scheme of glass has remained intact at Grote Sint-Jan Church, Gouda. The windows, some of which are 18 metres (59 feet) high, date from 1555 to the early 1600s; the earliest is the work of Dirck Crabeth and his brother Wouter. Many of the original cartoons still exist.

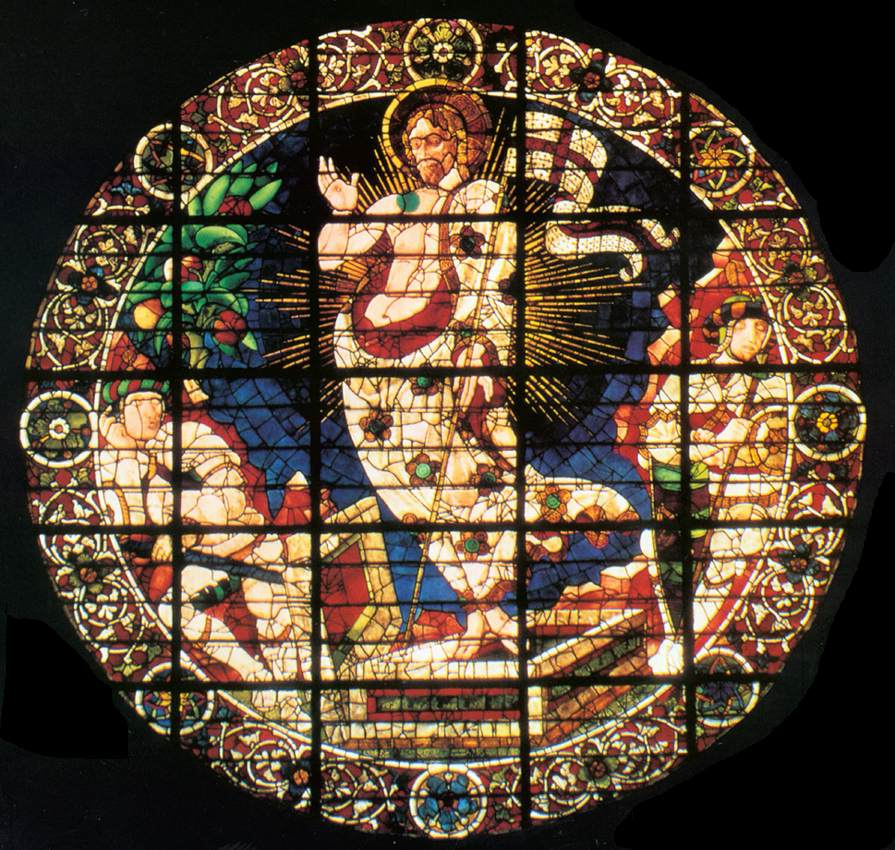
The Resurrection, Paolo Uccello (1443–1445), one of a series in the dome of Florence Cathedral designed by renowned Renaissance artists

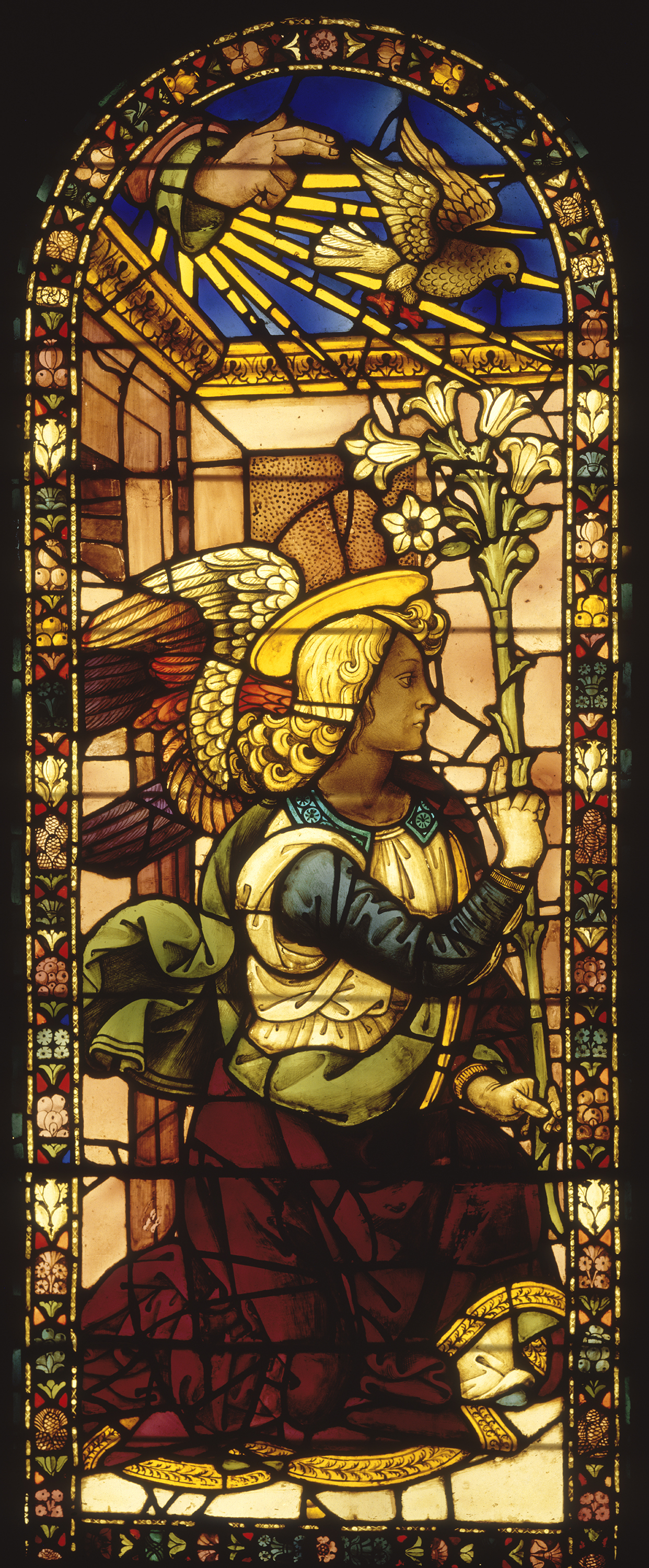
The Angel of the Annunciation, Giovanni di Domenico (1498–1503), National Gallery of Art

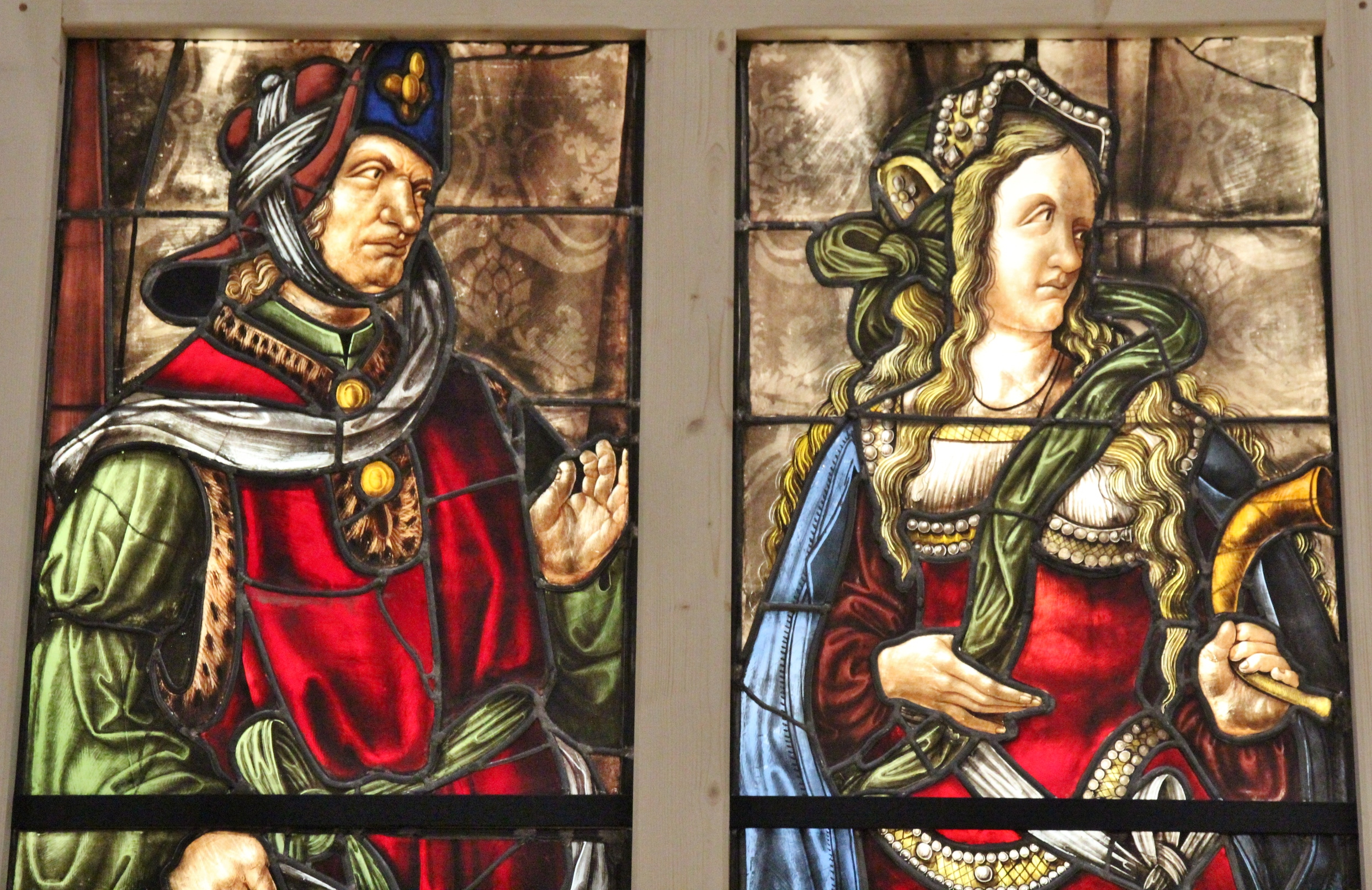
Renaissance stained glass, Auch Cathedral, France, Arnaud de Moles (detail, 1507–1513)

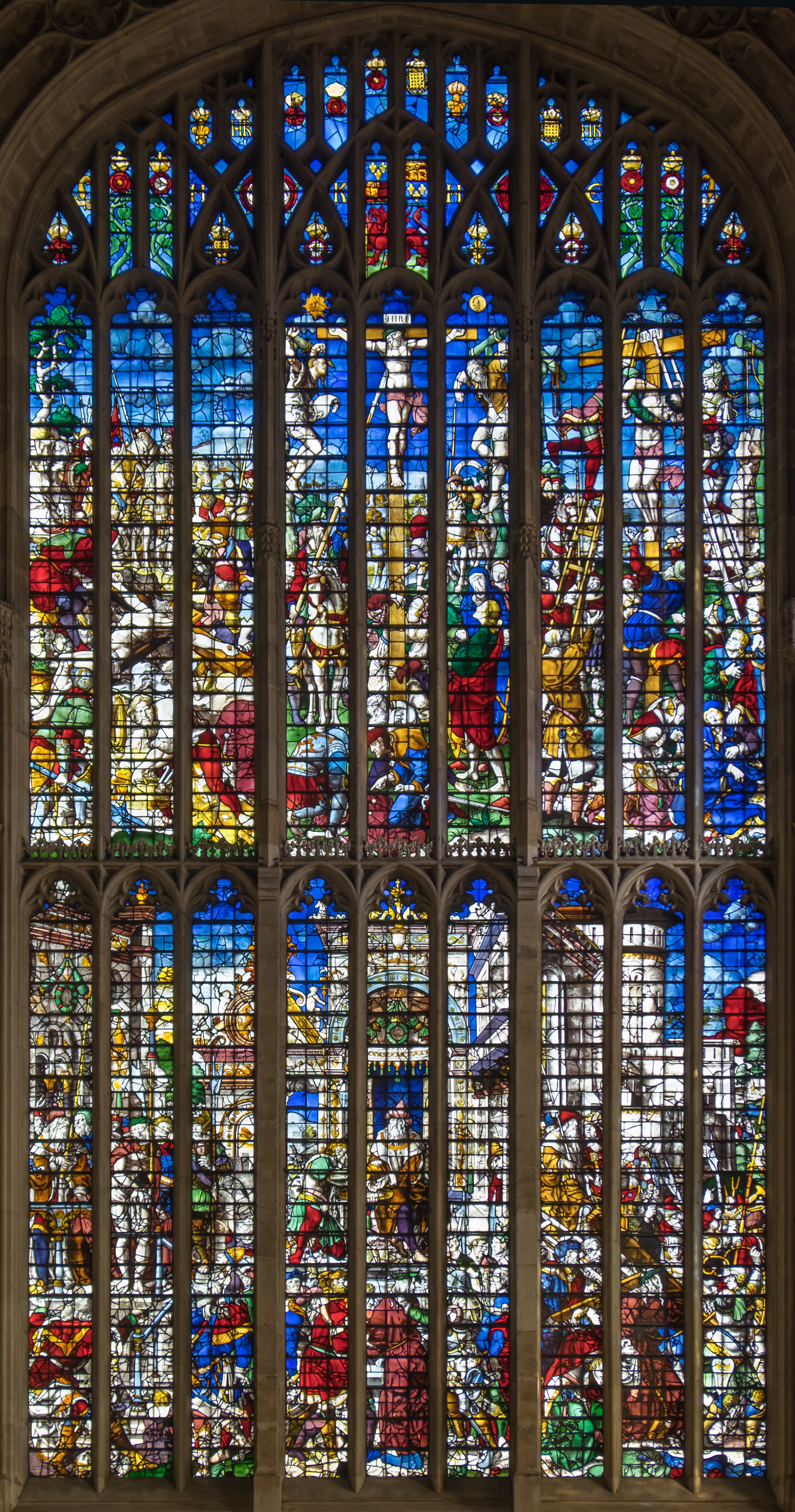
East window of King's College Chapel, Cambridge, Galyon Hone (1515–1531)

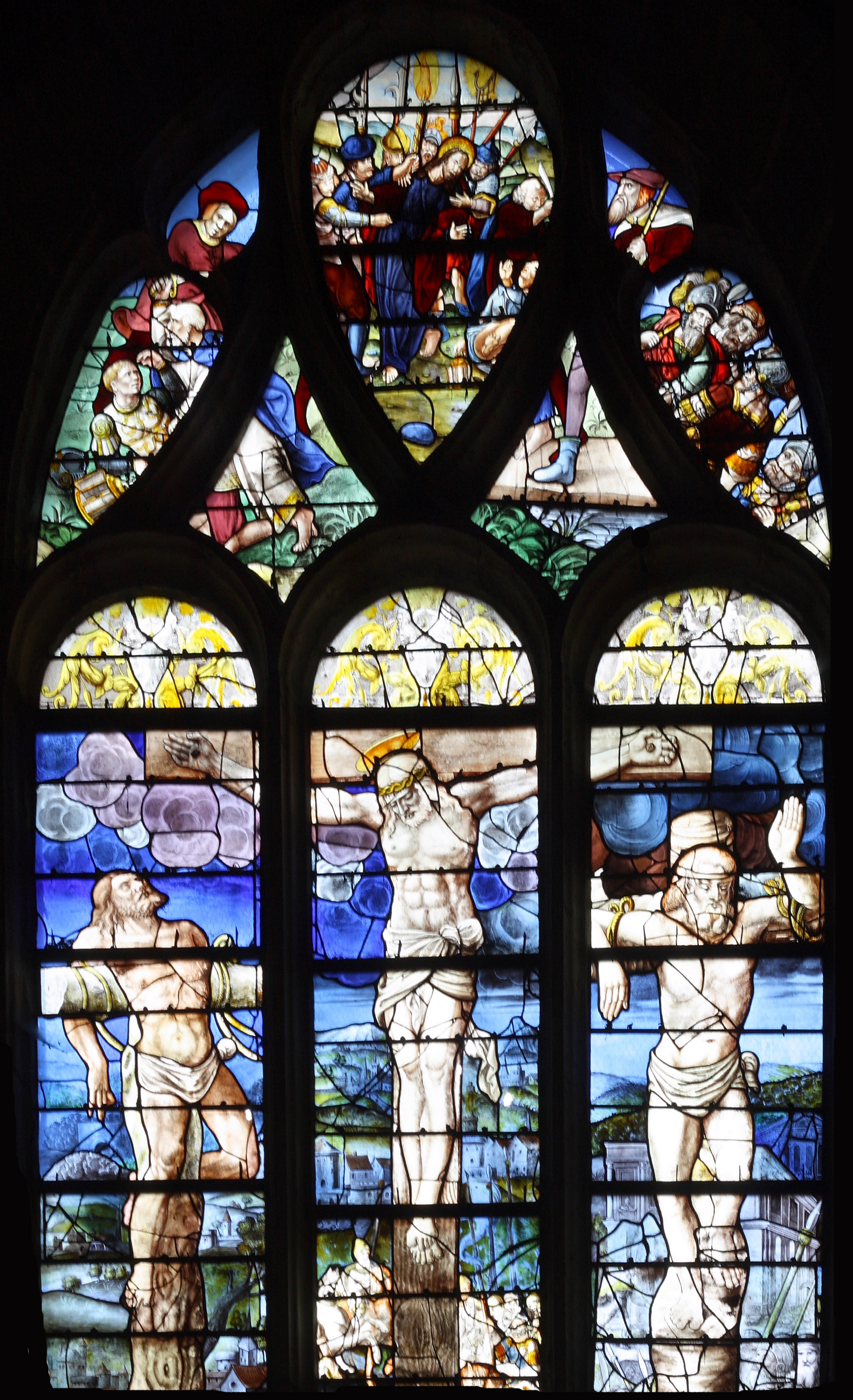
The Passion of Christ: the Capture and Crucifixion, Saint-Pierre, Limours, France (1520)

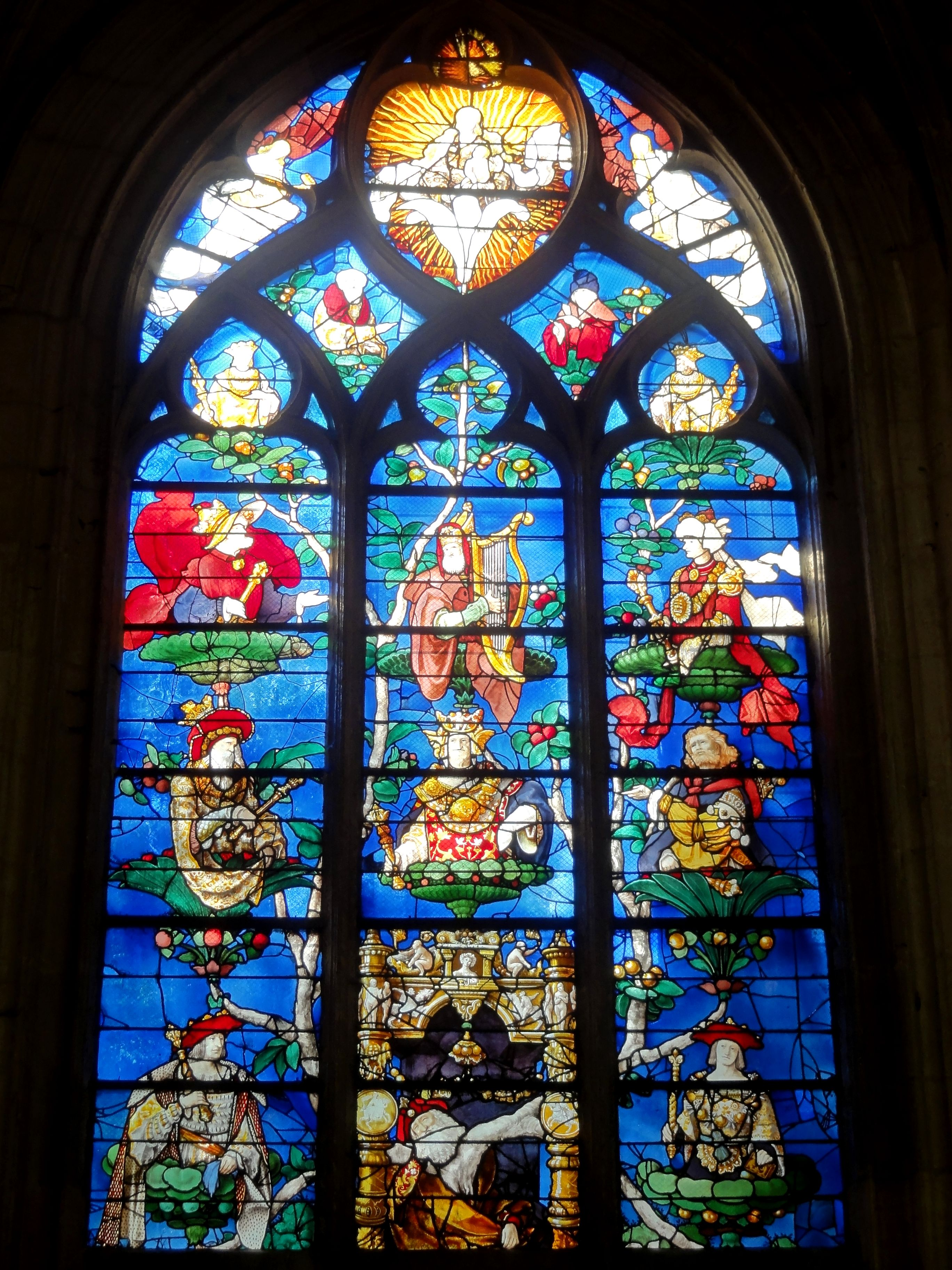
Tree of Jesse window, Church of St-Étienne, Beauvais, France, Engrand Le Prince (1522–1524)

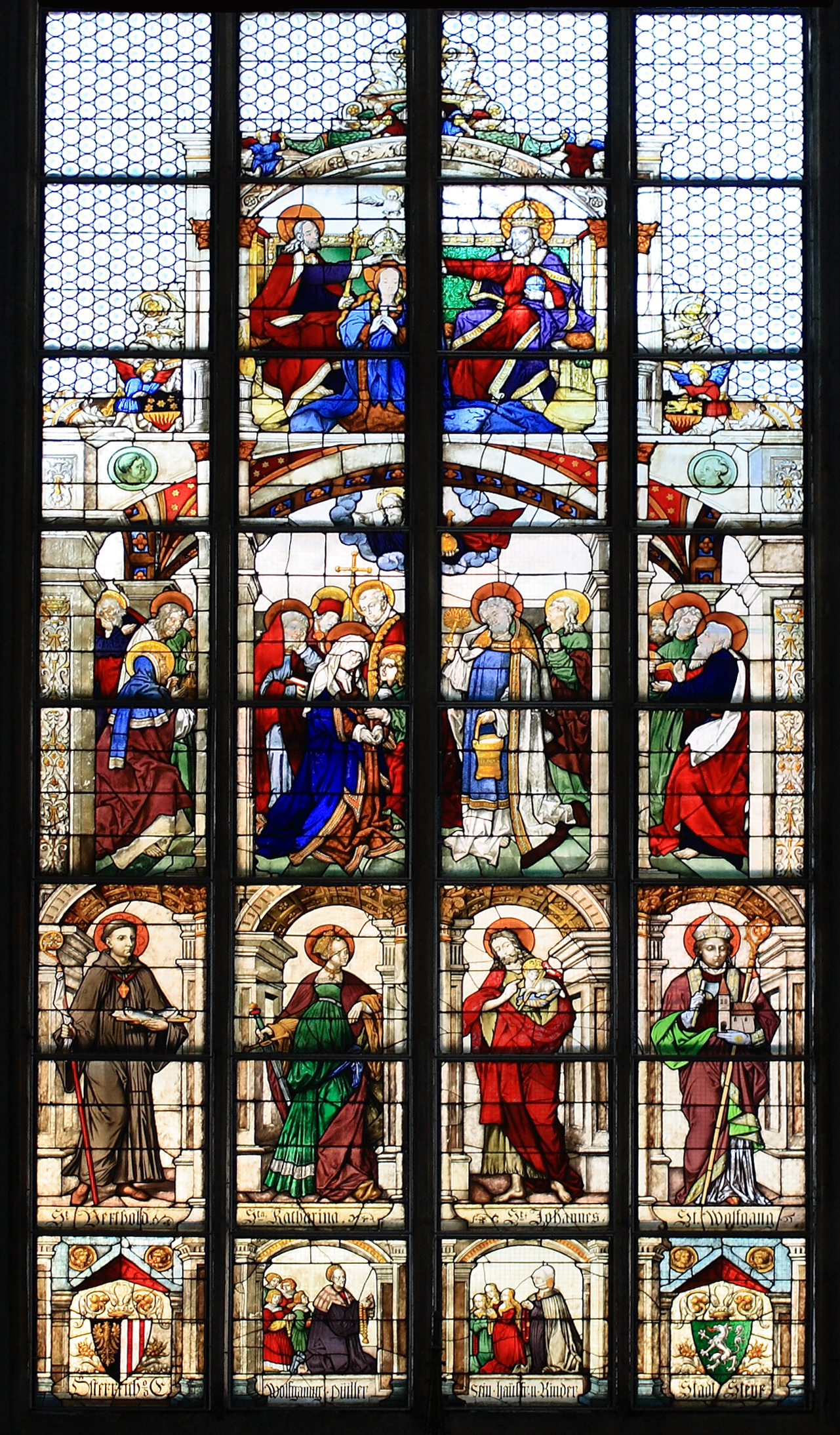
The Death and Assumption of the Virgin Mary, Church of SS Ägidius and Koloman, Steyr, Austria (1523)

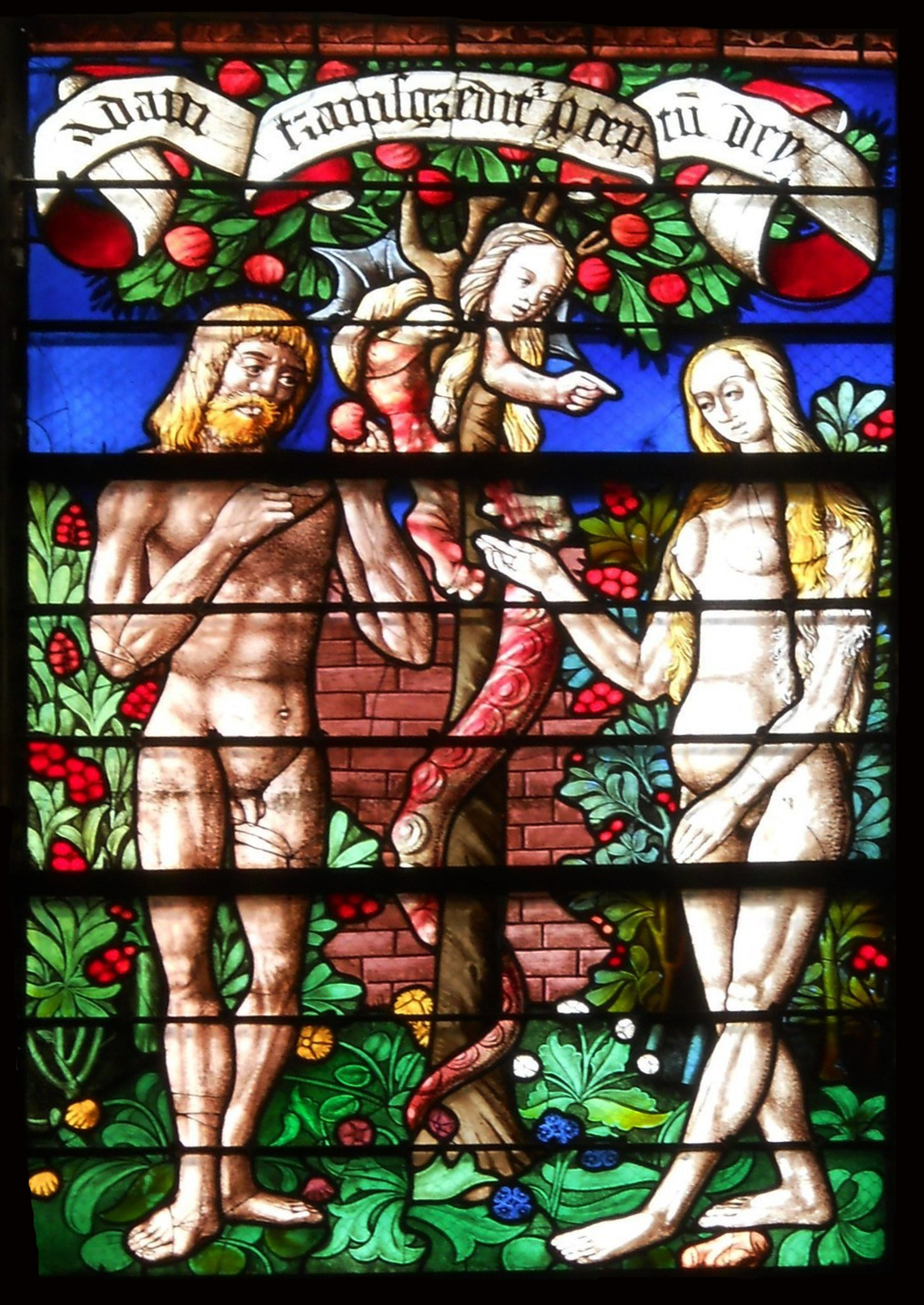
Detail of Adam and Eve from the Cathedral of St-Etienne, Châlons-en-Champagne, France

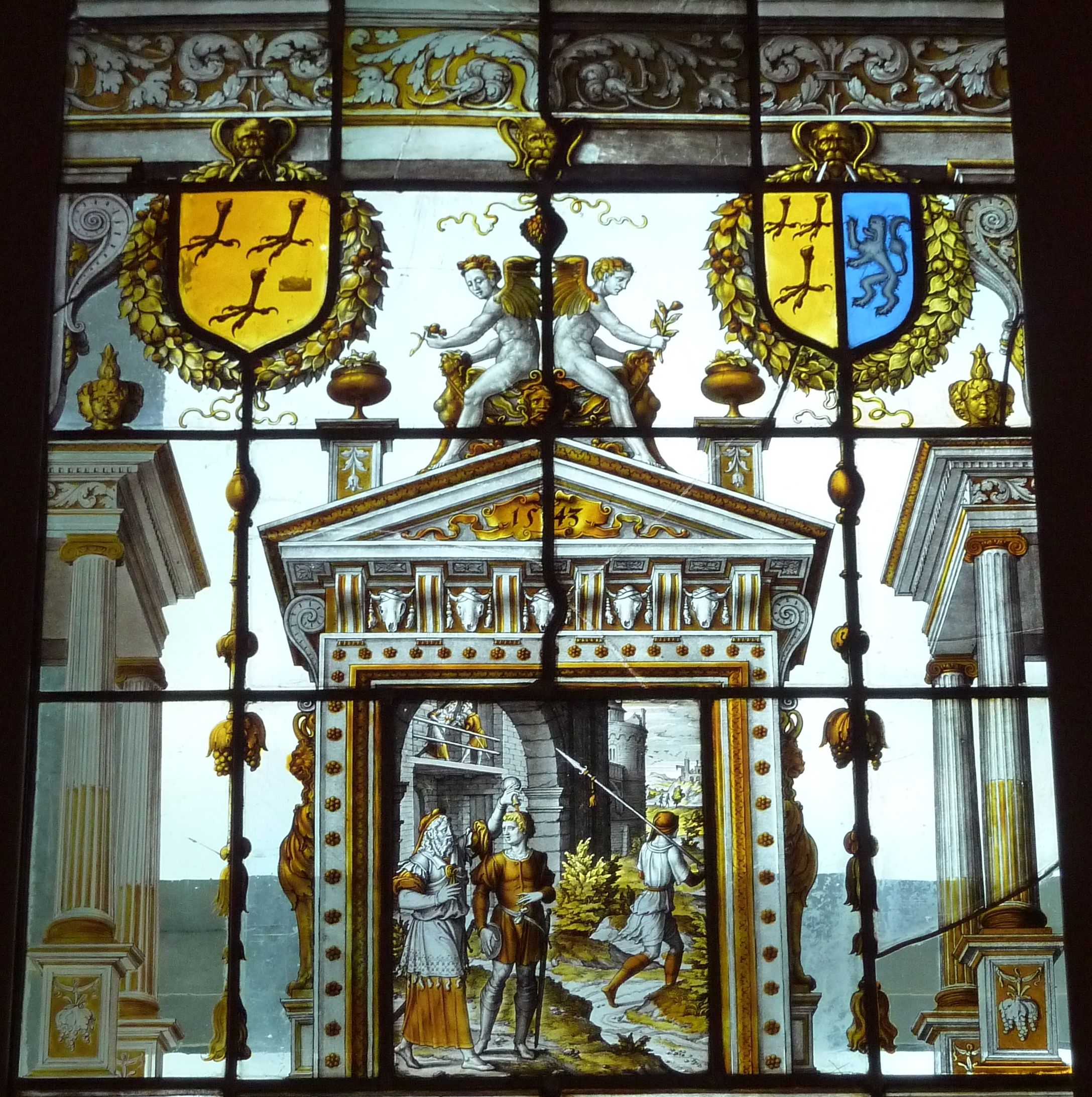
Domestic window by Dirck Crabeth for the house of Adriaen Dircxzoon van Crimpen of Leiden (1543). The windows show scenes from the lives of the Prophet Samuel and the Apostle Paul. Musée des Arts Décoratifs, Paris.

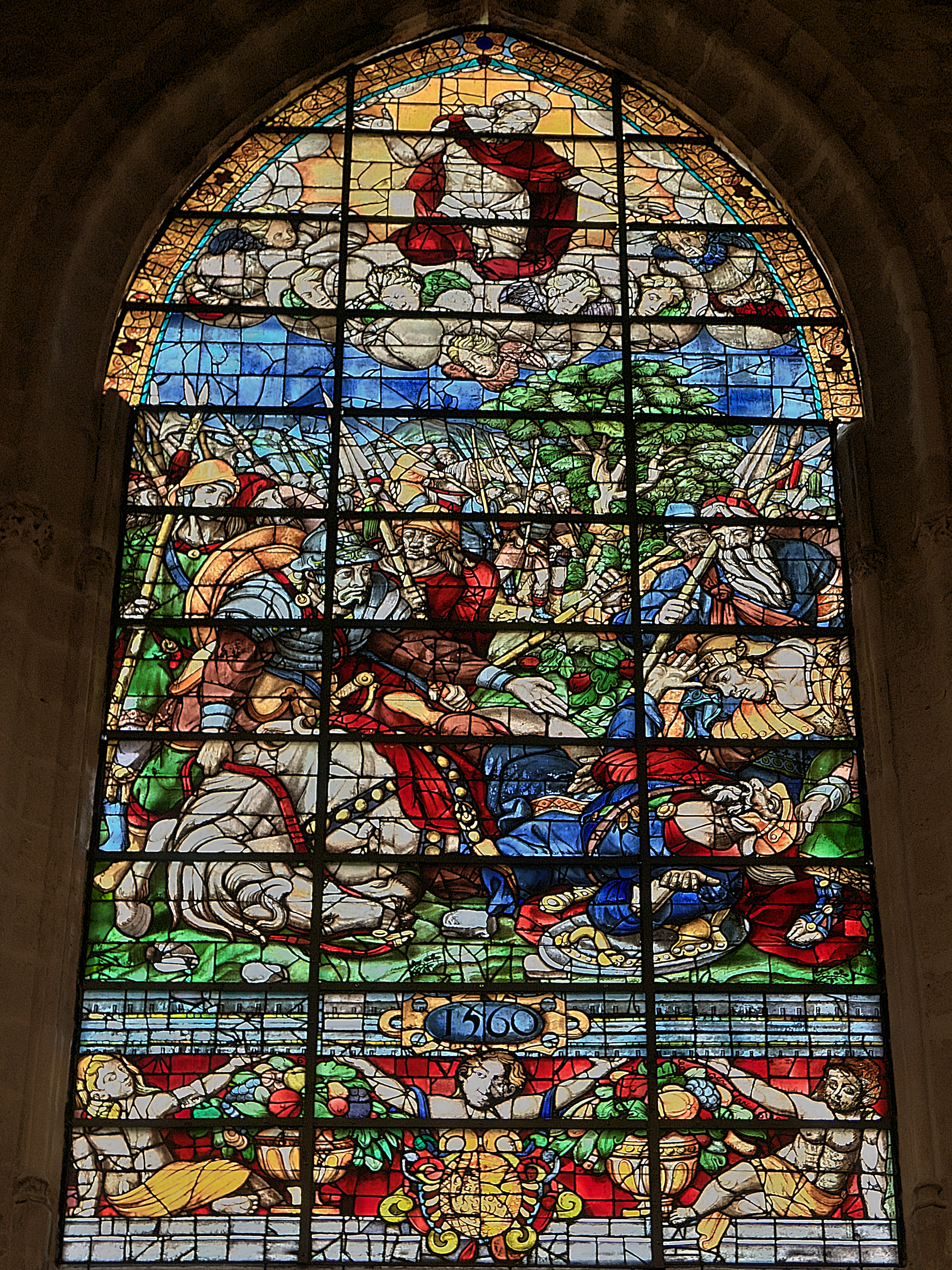
Window of the Conversion of St Paol, Chapel of St James, Seville Cathedral, Spain, Visente Mentdo (1560)

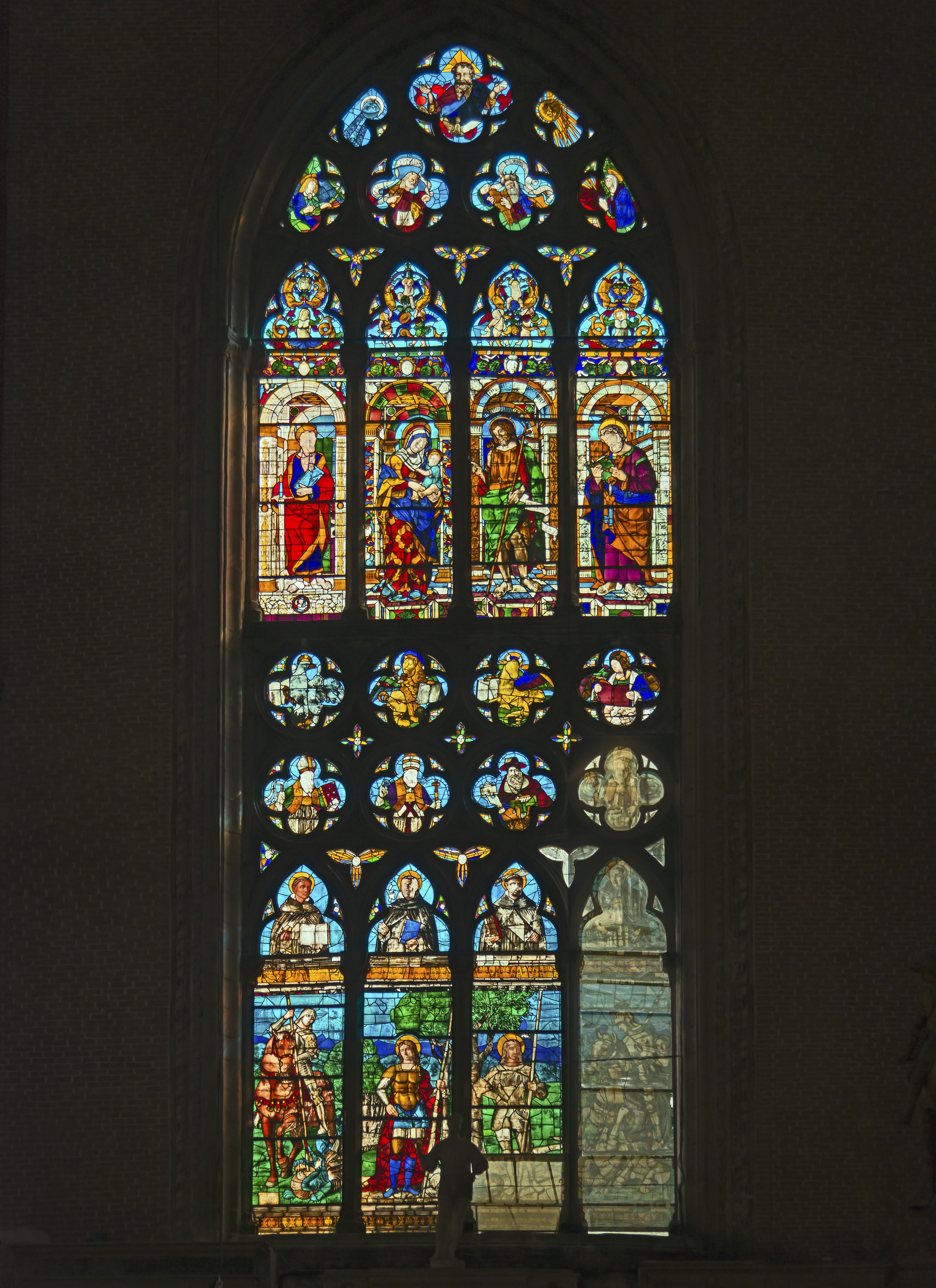
Renaissance window in the church of SS Giovanni and Paolo, Venice (16th century)

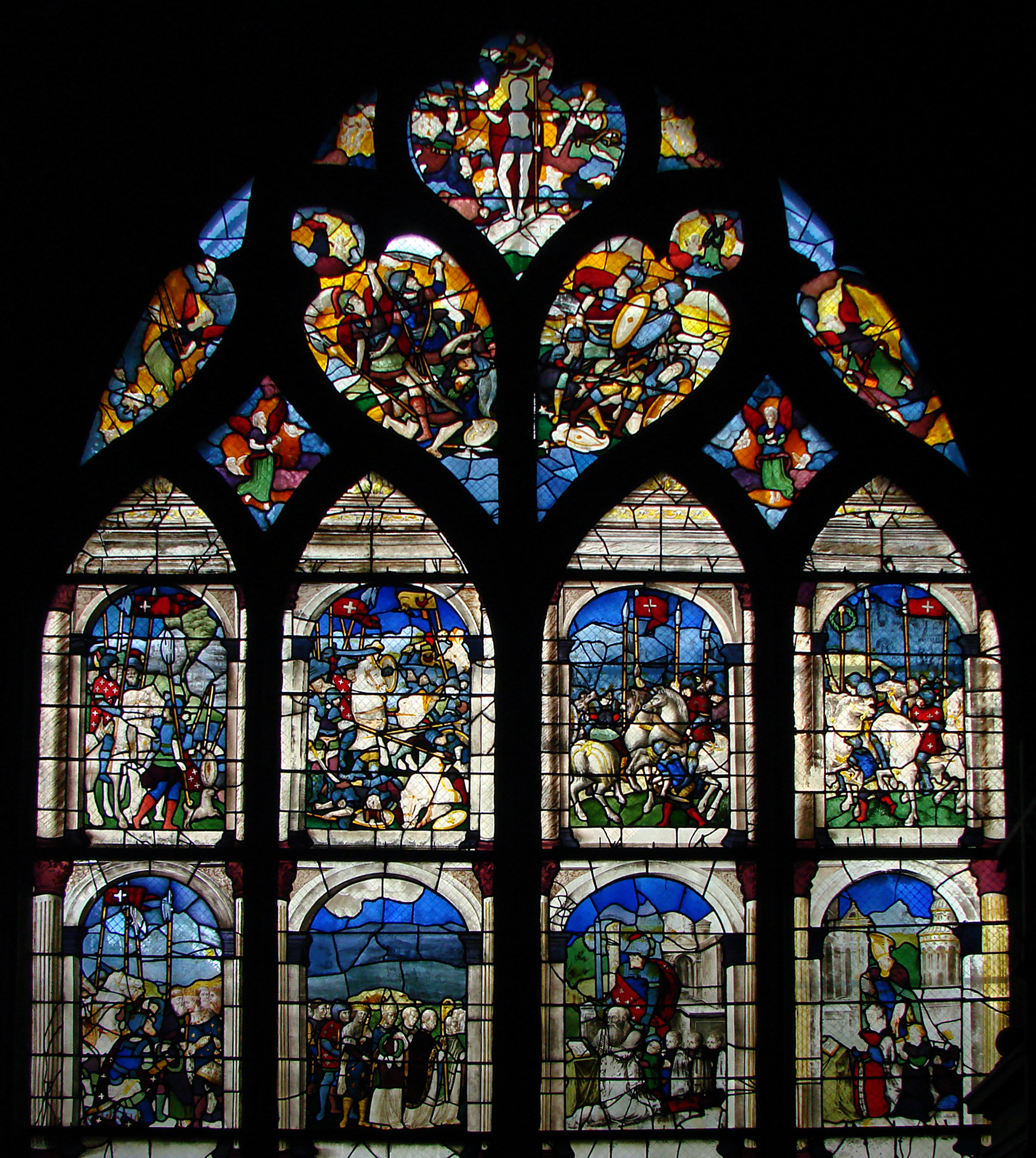
The story of how the Crown of Thorns passed from John of Brienne and Baldwin II of Constantinople to Saint Louis IX of France, Moulins Cathedral, France (16th century)

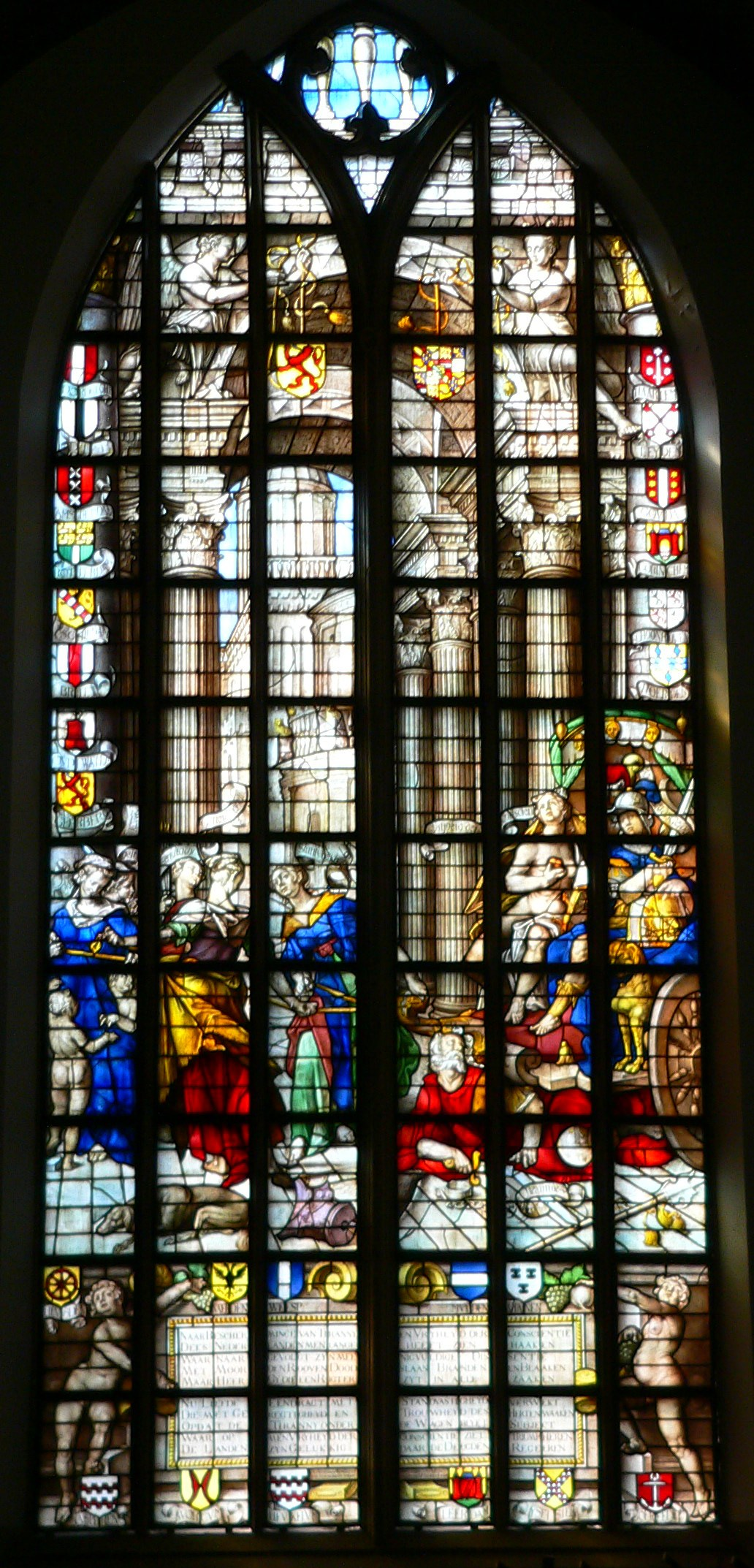
The Triumph of Freedom of Conscience, Sint Janskerk, maker Adriaen Gerritszoon de Vrije (Gouda); design Joachim Wtewael (Utrecht), Netherlands (1595–1600)

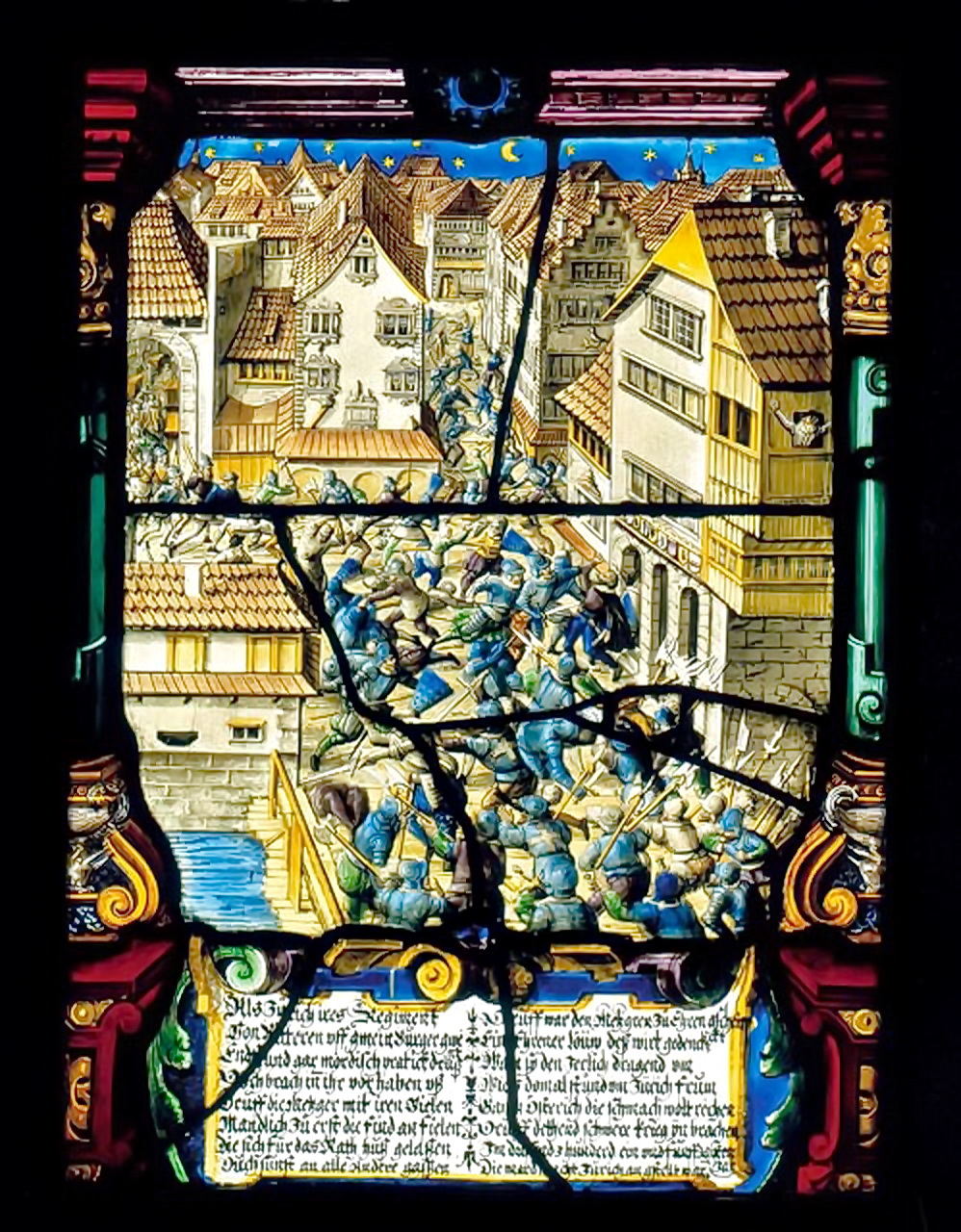
Glass painting depicting Mordnacht (murder night) on 23/24 February 1350 and heraldry of the first Meisen guild's Zunfthaus, Zürich, Switzerland (c. 1650)

=== In Latin America ===
Stained glass was first imported to Latin America during the 17th–18th centuries by Portuguese and Spanish settlers. By the 20th century, many European artists had begun to establish their own studios within Latin America and had started up local production. With these new local studios came inventive techniques and less traditional imagery. Examples of these more modern works of art are the Basílica Nuestra Señora de Lourde and the Templo Vótivo de Maipú, both located in Chile.

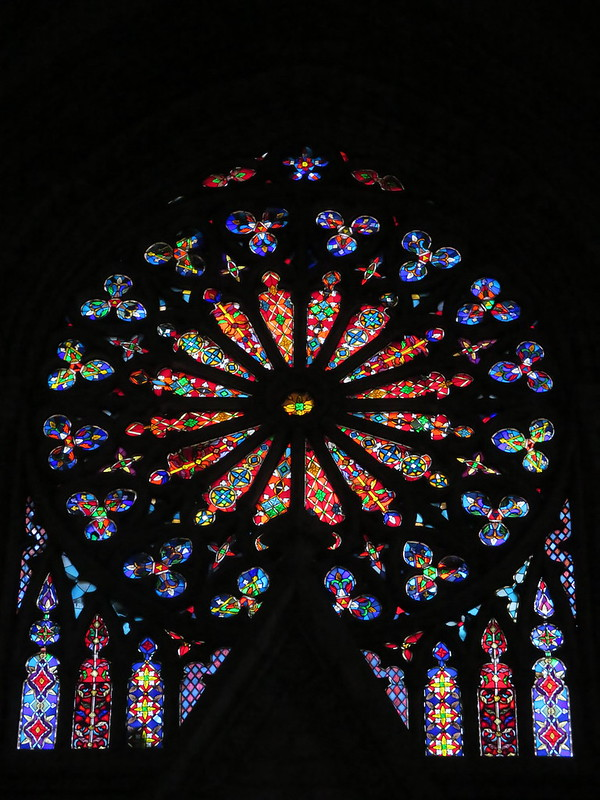
Largest rose window in the Basílica del Voto Nacional, located in Quito, Ecuador

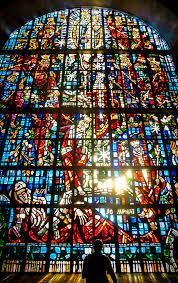
Large stained-glass window at the Basílica Nuestra Señora de Lourdes, located in Buenos Aires, Argentina

=== Revival in Great Britain and Ireland ===
The Catholic revival in England, gaining force in the early 19th century with its renewed interest in the medieval church, brought a revival of church building in the Gothic style, claimed by John Ruskin to be "the true Catholic style". The architectural movement was led by Augustus Welby Pugin. Many new churches were planted in large towns and many old churches were restored. This brought about a great demand for the revival of the art of stained-glass window making.

Among the earliest 19th-century English manufacturers and designers were William Warrington and John Hardman of Birmingham, whose nephew, John Hardman Powell, had a commercial eye and exhibited works at the Philadelphia Exhibition of 1876, influencing stained glass in the United States of America. Other manufacturers included William Wailes, Ward and Hughes, Clayton and Bell, Heaton, Butler and Bayne and Charles Eamer Kempe. A Scottish designer, Daniel Cottier, opened firms in Australia and the US.

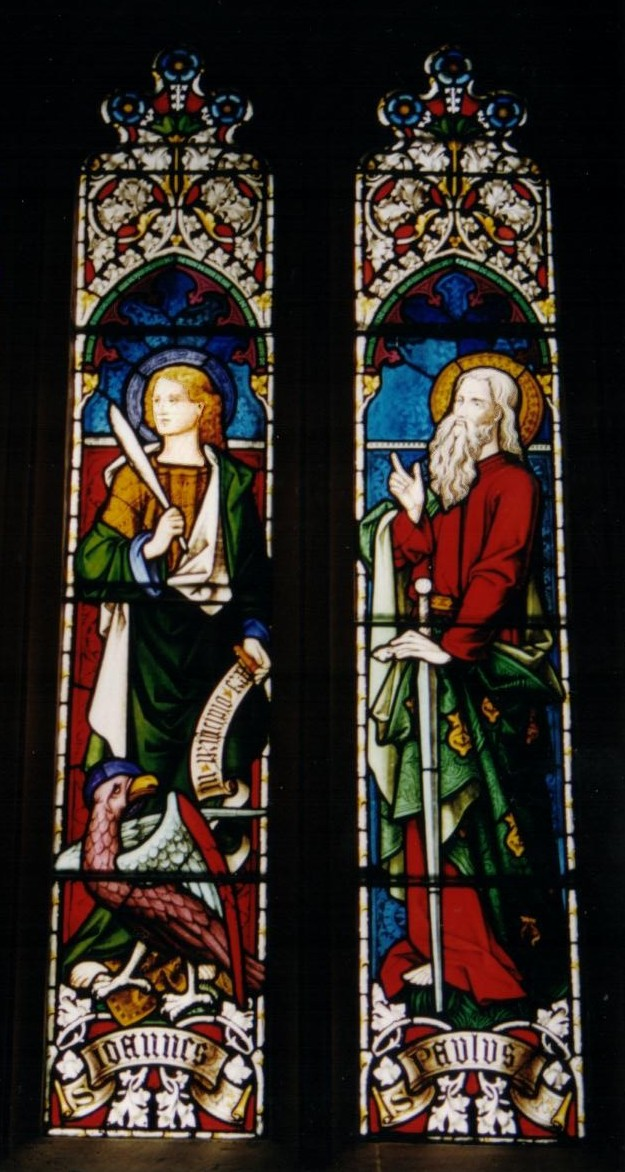
Detail, Apostles John and Paul, Hardman of Birmingham (1861–1867), typical of Hardman in its elegant arrangement of figures and purity of colour. St. Andrew's Cathedral, Sydney.

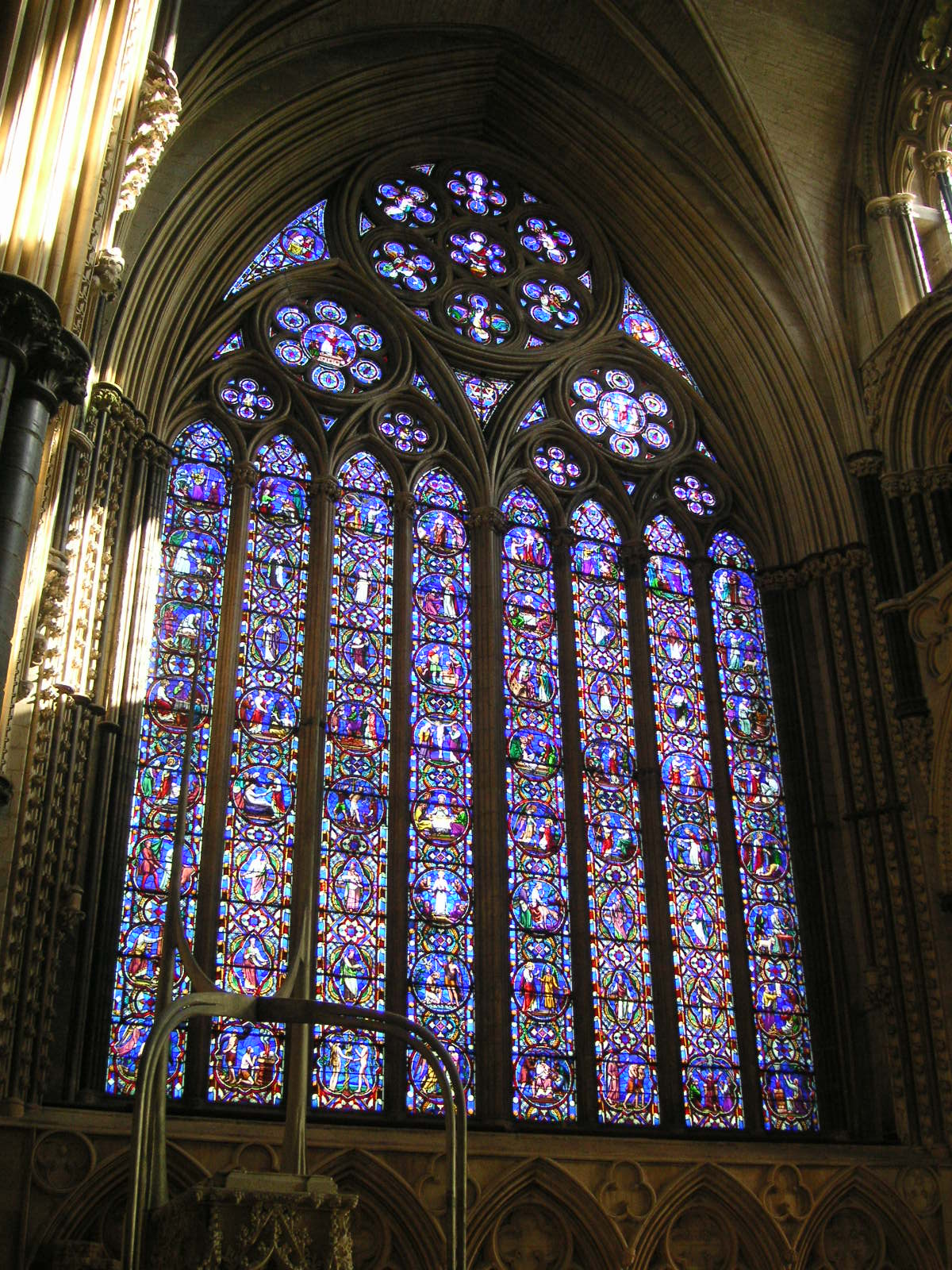
One of England's largest windows, the east window of Lincoln Cathedral, Ward and Nixon (1855), is a formal arrangement of small narrative scenes in roundels.

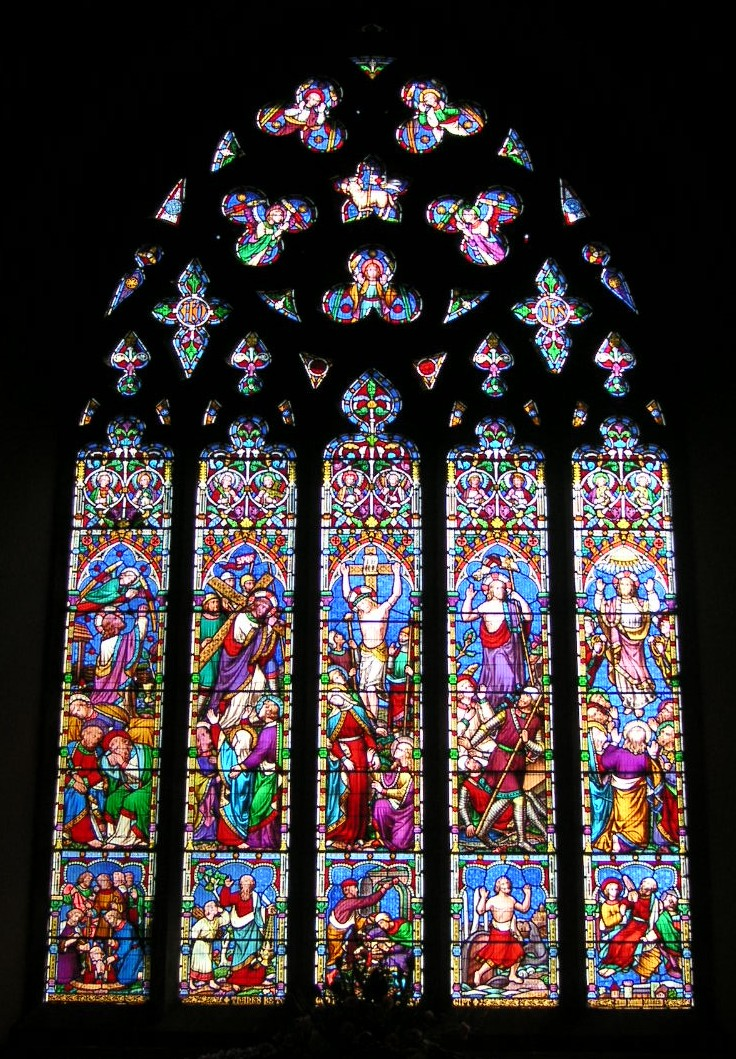
William Wailes. This window has the bright pastel colour, wealth of inventive ornament, and stereotypical gestures of windows by this firm. St Mary's, Chilham.

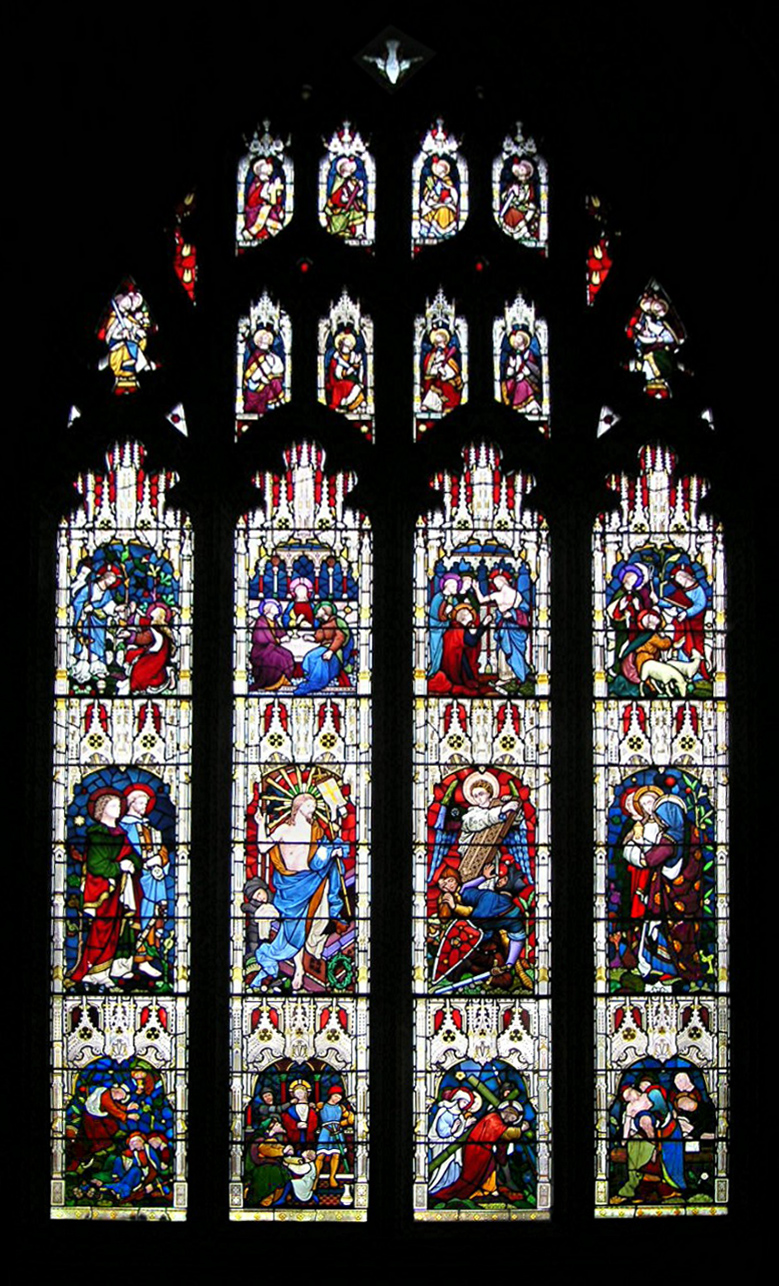
Clayton and Bell. A narrative window with elegant forms and colour which is both brilliant and subtle in its combinations. Peterborough Cathedral.

=== Revival in France ===
In France there was a greater continuity of stained glass production than in England. In the early 19th century most stained glass was made of large panes that were extensively painted and fired, the designs often being copied directly from oil paintings by famous artists. In 1824 the Sèvres porcelain factory began producing stained glass to supply the increasing demand. In France many churches and cathedrals suffered despoliation during the French Revolution. During the 19th century a great number of churches were restored by Viollet-le-Duc. Many of France's finest ancient windows were restored at that time. From 1839 onwards much stained glass was produced that very closely imitated medieval glass, both in the artwork and in the nature of the glass itself. The pioneers were Henri Gèrente and André Lusson. Other glass was designed in a more Classical manner, and characterised by the brilliant cerulean colour of the blue backgrounds (as against the purple-blue of the glass of Chartres) and the use of pink and mauve glass.

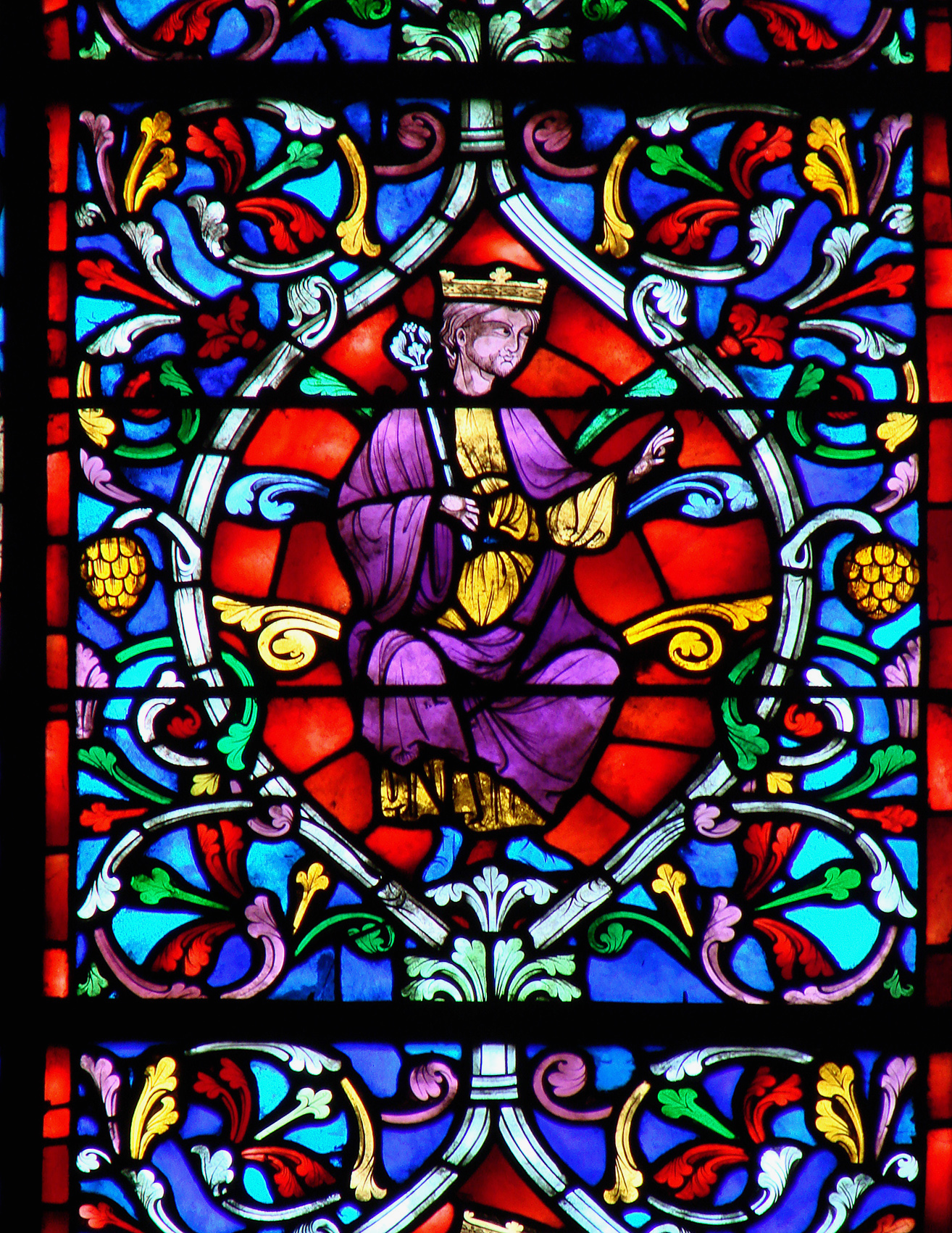
Detail of a "Tree of Jesse" window in Reims Cathedral designed in the 13th-century style by L. Steiheil and painted by Coffetier for Viollet-le-Duc (1861)

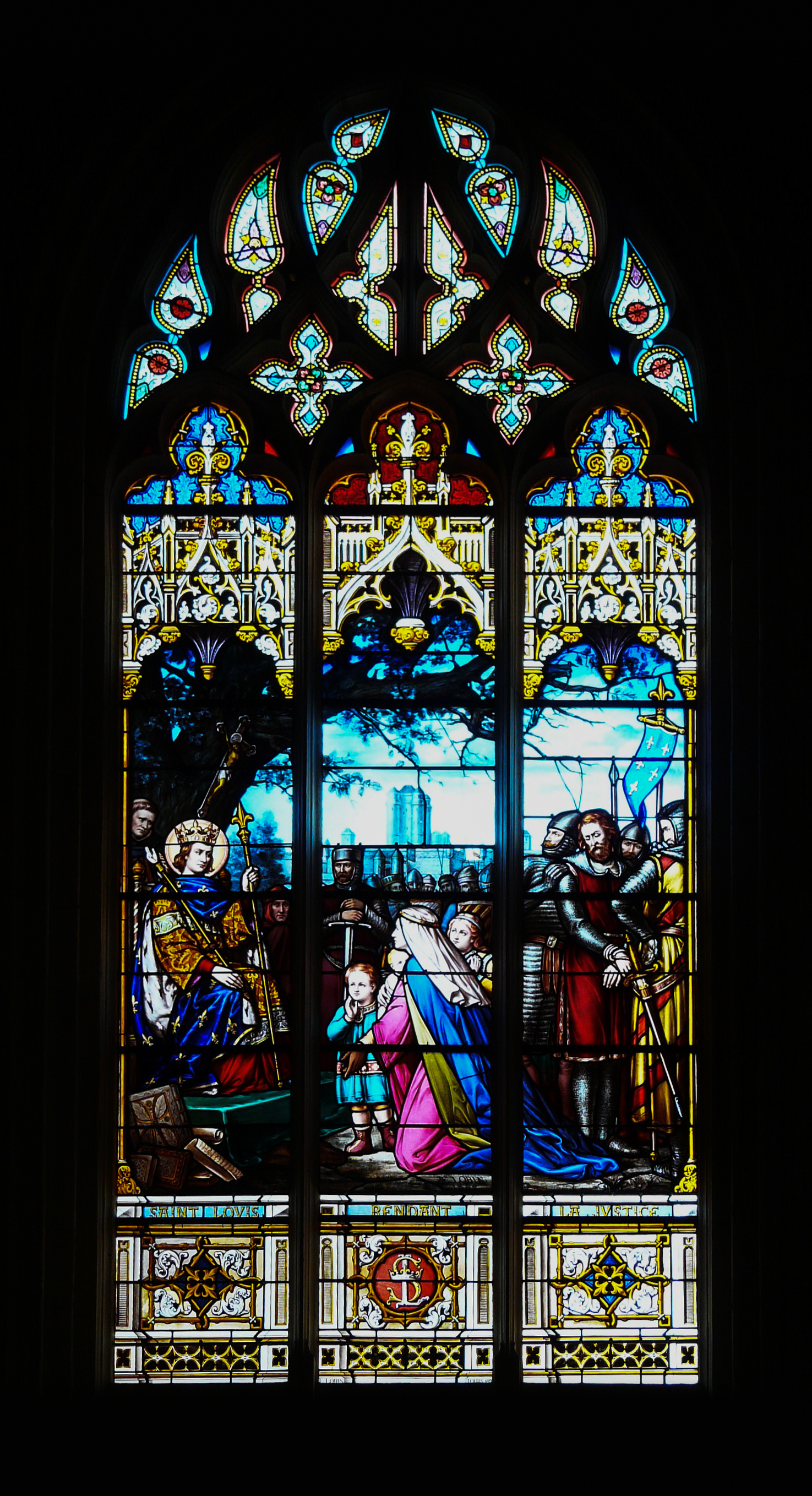
St Louis administering Justice by Lobin in the painterly style, Church of St Medard, Thouars (19th century)

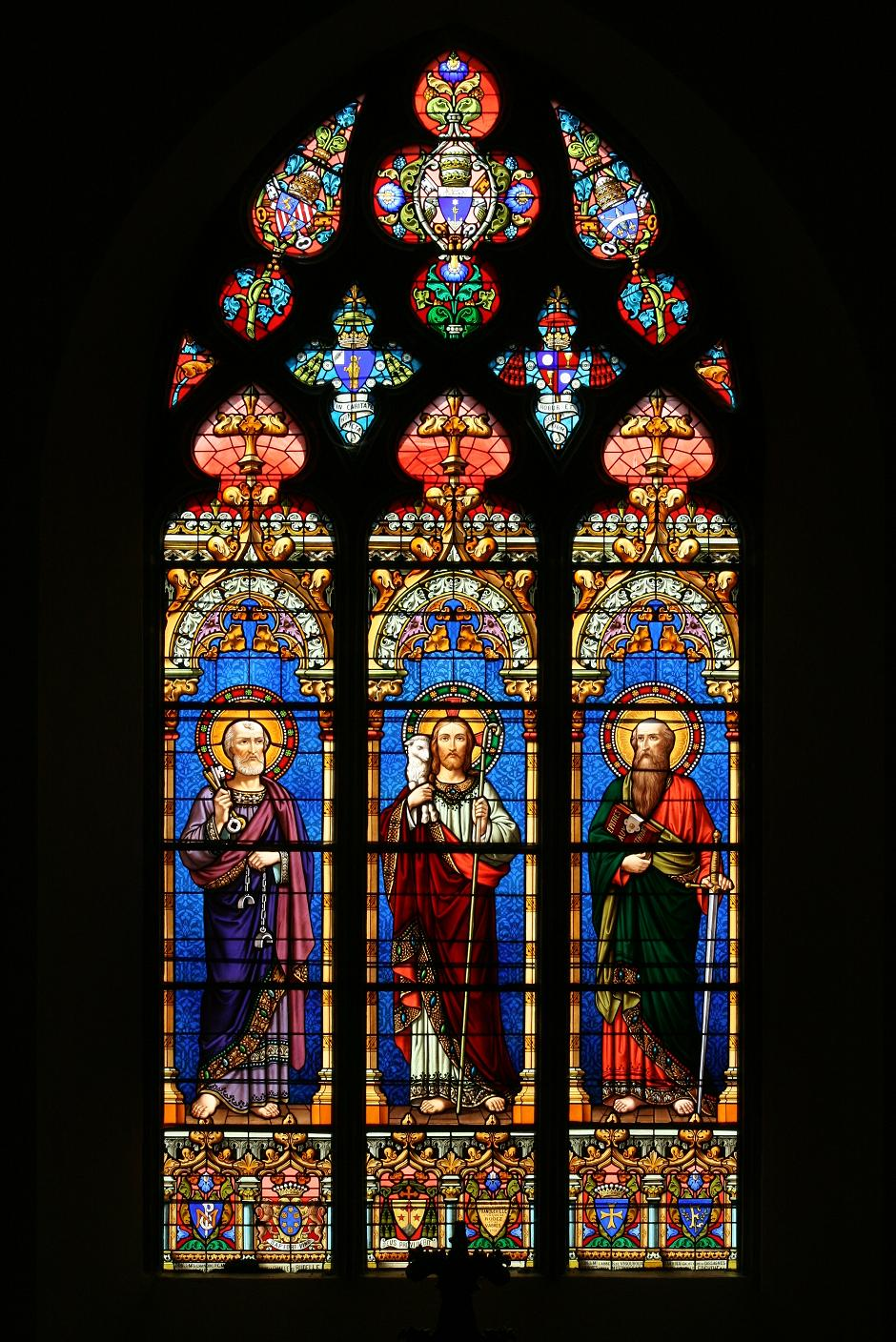
A brightly coloured window at Cassagnes-Bégonhès, Aveyron

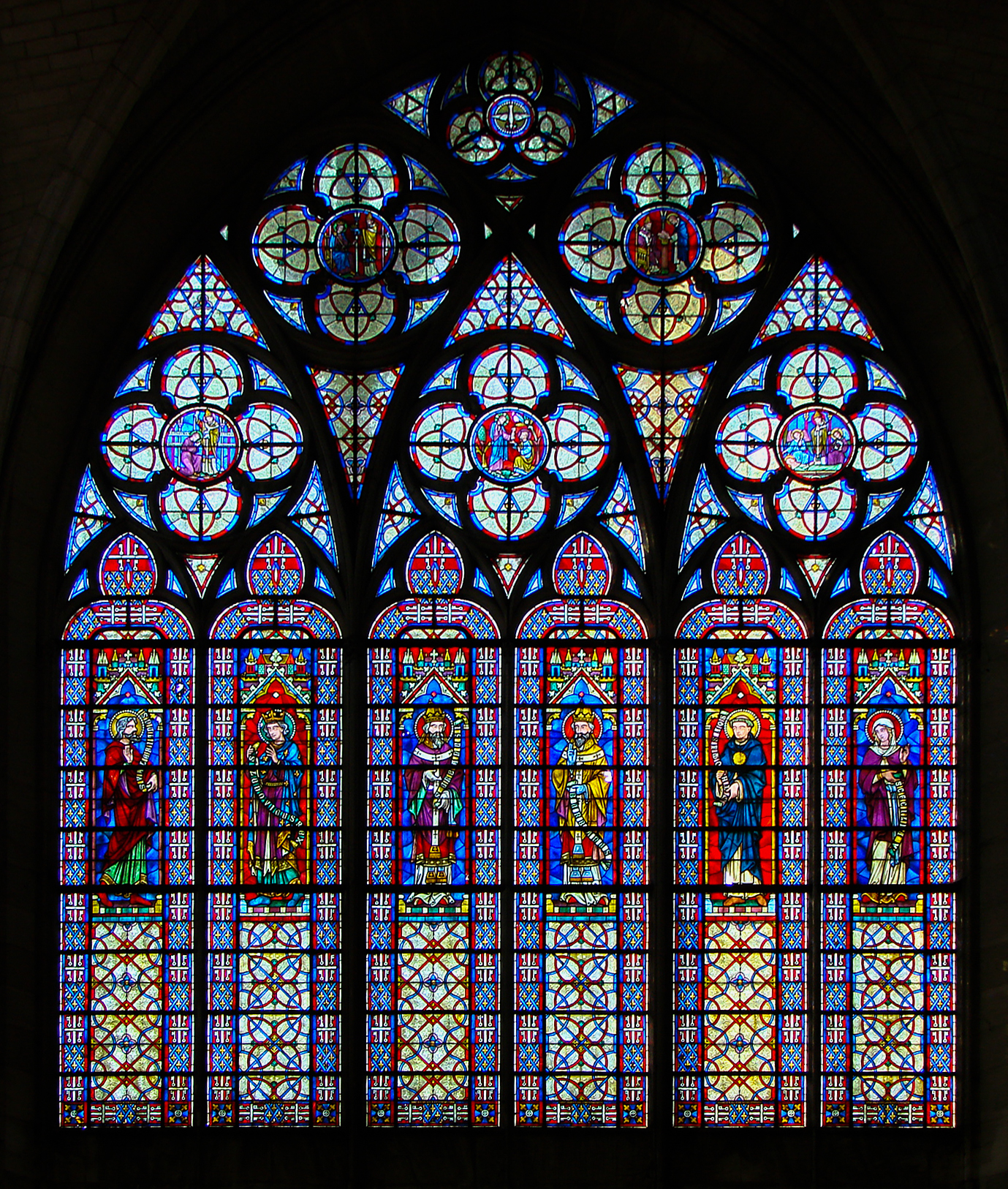
West window from Saint-Urbain, Troyes (c. 1900)

=== Revival in Germany, Austria and beyond ===
During the mid- to late 19th century, many of Germany's ancient buildings were restored, and some, such as Cologne Cathedral, were completed in the medieval style. There was a great demand for stained glass. The designs for many windows were based directly on the work of famous engravers such as Albrecht Dürer. Original designs often imitate this style. Much 19th-century German glass has large sections of painted detail rather than outlines and details dependent on the lead. The Royal Bavarian Glass Painting Studio was founded by Ludwig I in 1827. A major firm was Mayer of Munich, which commenced glass production in 1860, and is still operating as Franz Mayer of Munich, Inc.. German stained glass found a market across Europe, in America and Australia. Stained glass studios were also founded in Italy and Belgium at this time.

In the Austrian Empire and later Austria-Hungary, one of the leading stained glass artists was Carl Geyling, who founded his studio in 1841. His son would continue the tradition as Carl Geyling's Erben, which still exists today. Carl Geyling's Erben completed numerous stained-glass windows for major churches in Vienna and elsewhere, and received an imperial and royal warrant of appointment from emperor Franz Joseph I of Austria.

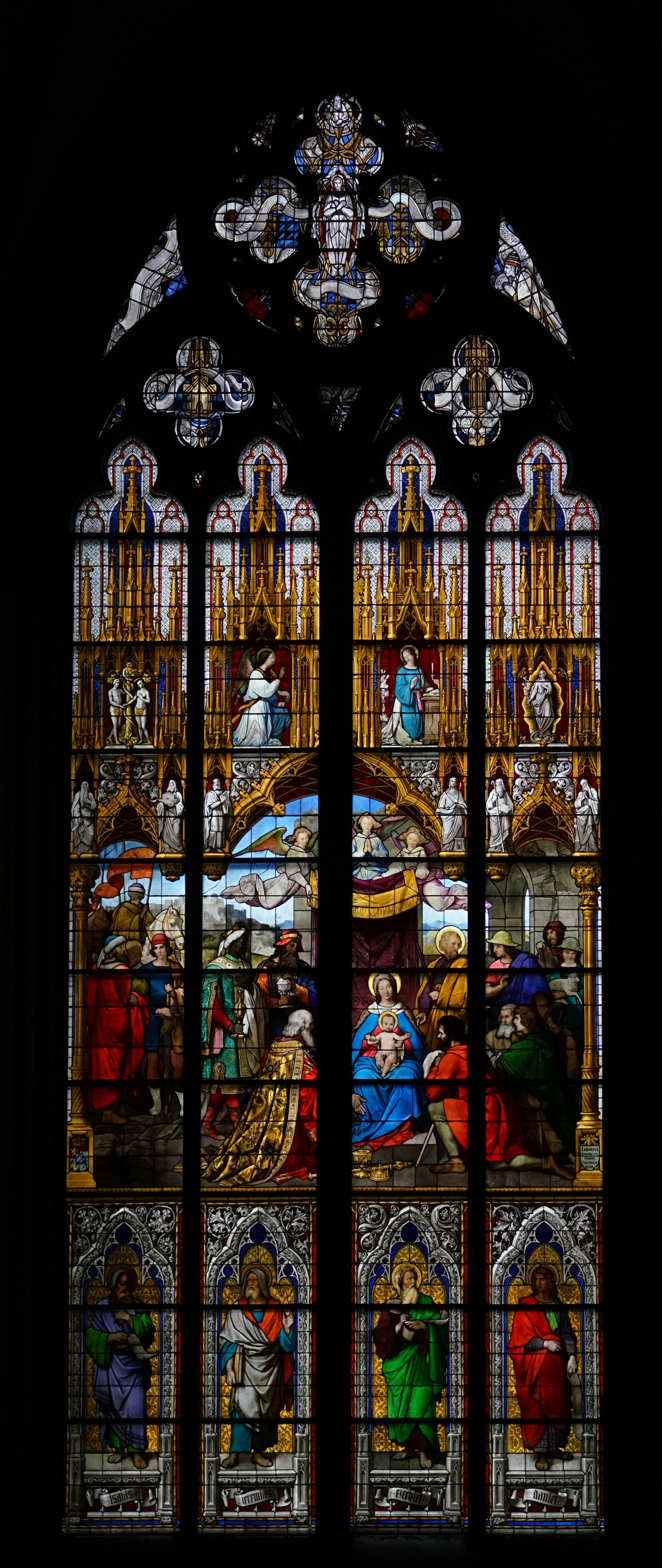
One of five windows donated by Ludwig II of Bavaria to Cologne Cathedral (19th century)

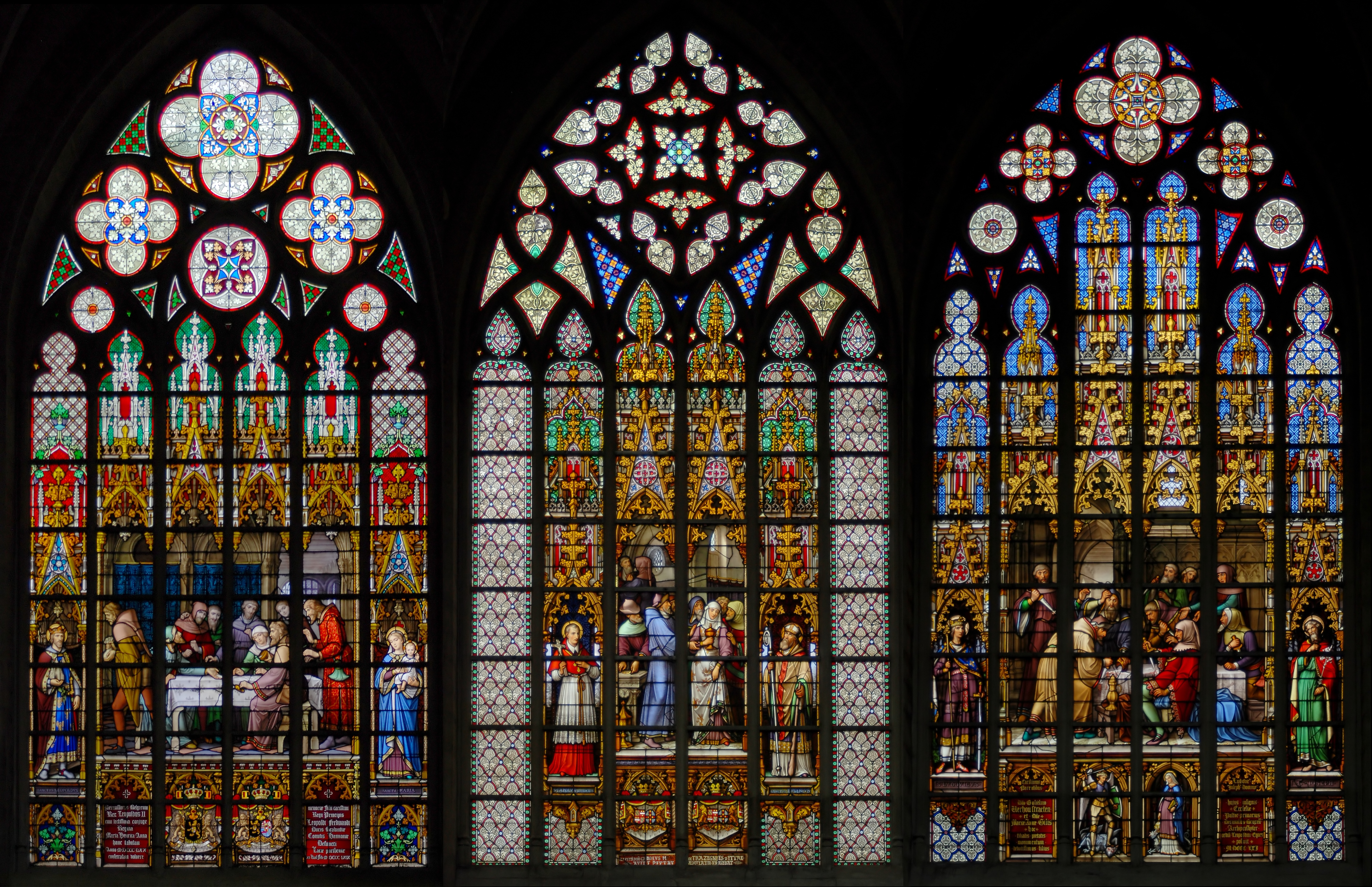
Three scenes of the Legend of the Sacrament of Miracle, Cathedral of St. Michael and St. Gudula, Brussels, Belgium (c. 1870)

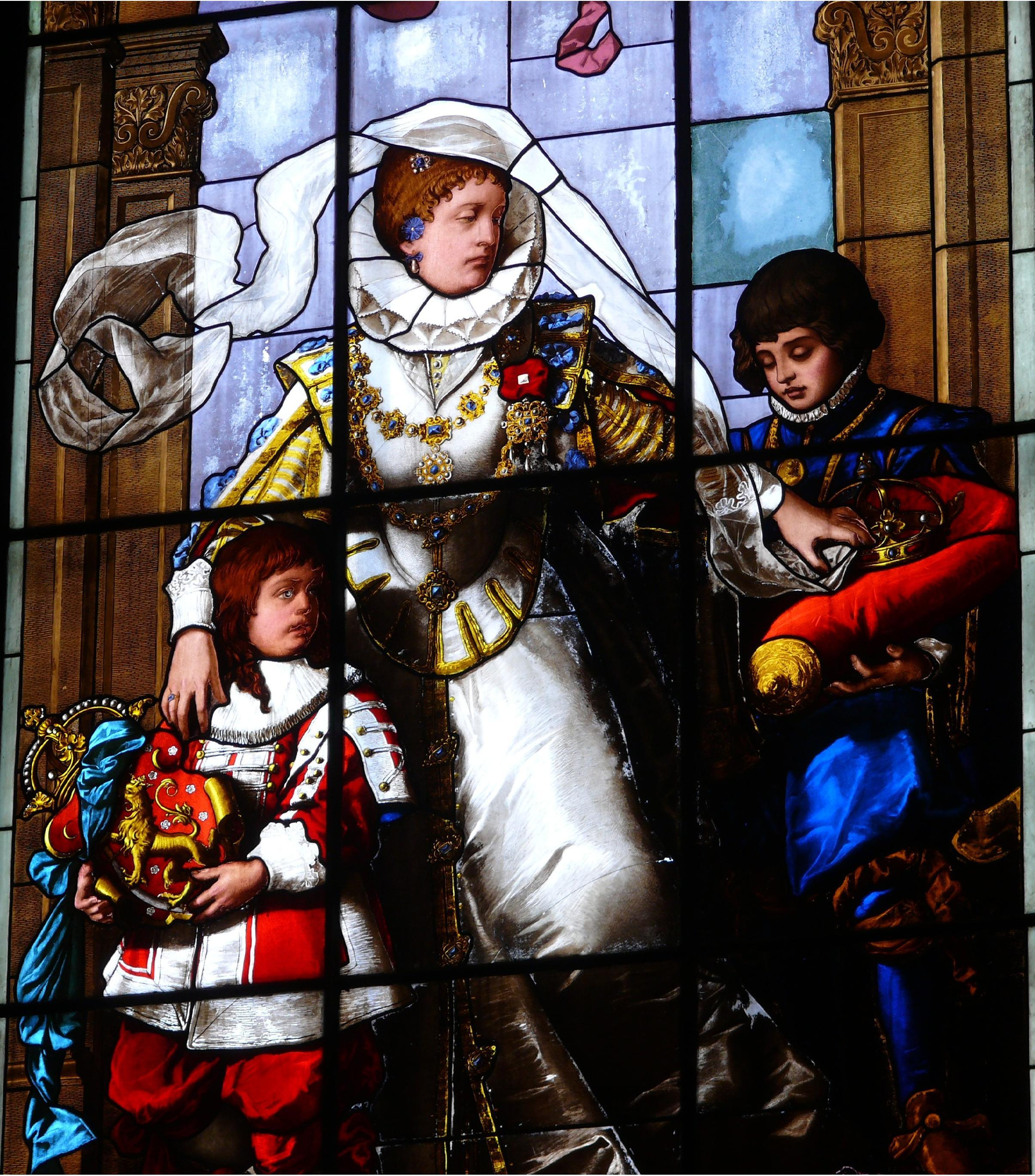
Queen Catherine of Sweden (1568) with two pages, Turku Cathedral, Finland (c. 1875)

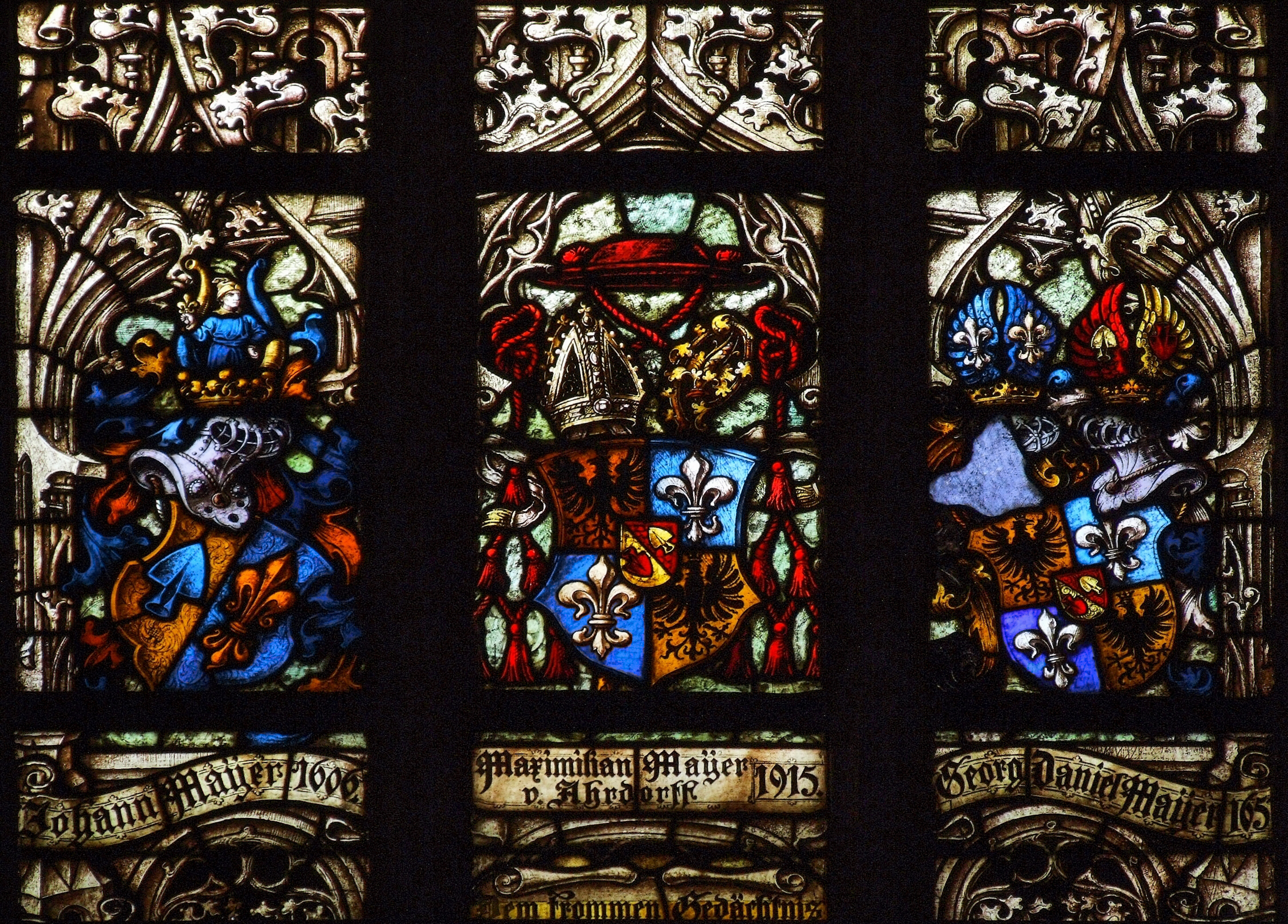
A window in the Late Gothic style, St Maurice's Church, Olomouc, Czech Republic (early 20th century)

=== Innovations in Britain and Europe ===
Among the most innovative English designers were the Pre-Raphaelites, William Morris (1834–1898) and Edward Burne-Jones (1833–1898), whose work heralds the influential Arts and Crafts Movement, which regenerated stained glass throughout the English-speaking world. Amongst its most important exponents in England was Christopher Whall (1849–1924), author of the classic craft manual 'Stained Glass Work' (published London and New York, 1905), who advocated the direct involvement of designers in the making of their windows. His masterpiece is the series of windows (1898–1910) in the Lady Chapel at Gloucester Cathedral. Whall taught at London's Royal College of Art and Central School of Arts and Crafts: his many pupils and followers included Karl Parsons, Mary Lowndes, Henry Payne, Caroline Townshend, Veronica Whall (his daughter) and Paul Woodroffe. The Scottish artist Douglas Strachan (1875–1950), influenced by Whall's example, developed the Arts & Crafts idiom in an expressionist manner, in which powerful imagery and meticulous technique are masterfully combined. In Ireland, a generation of young artists taught by Whall's pupil Alfred Child at Dublin's Metropolitan School of Art created a distinctive national school of stained glass: its leading representatives were Wilhelmina Geddes, Michael Healy and Harry Clarke.

Art Nouveau or Belle Époque stained glass design flourished in France and Eastern Europe, where it can be identified by the use of curving, sinuous lines in the lead, and swirling motifs. In France it is seen in the work of Francis Chigot of Limoges. In Britain it appears in the refined and formal leadlight designs of Charles Rennie Mackintosh.

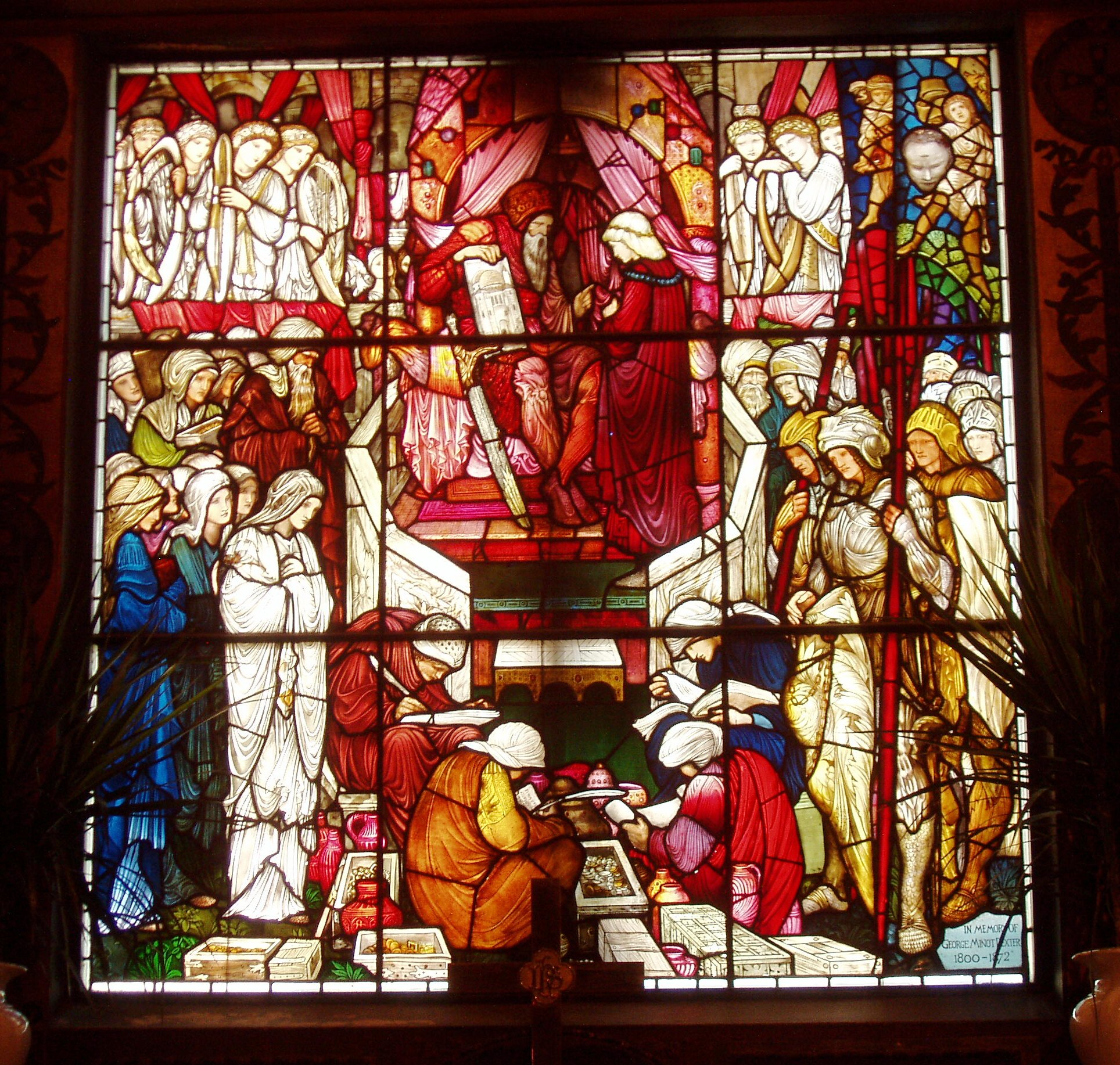
David's charge to Solomon shows the strongly linear design and use of flashed glass for which Burne-Jones' designs are famous. Trinity Church, Boston, US (1882).

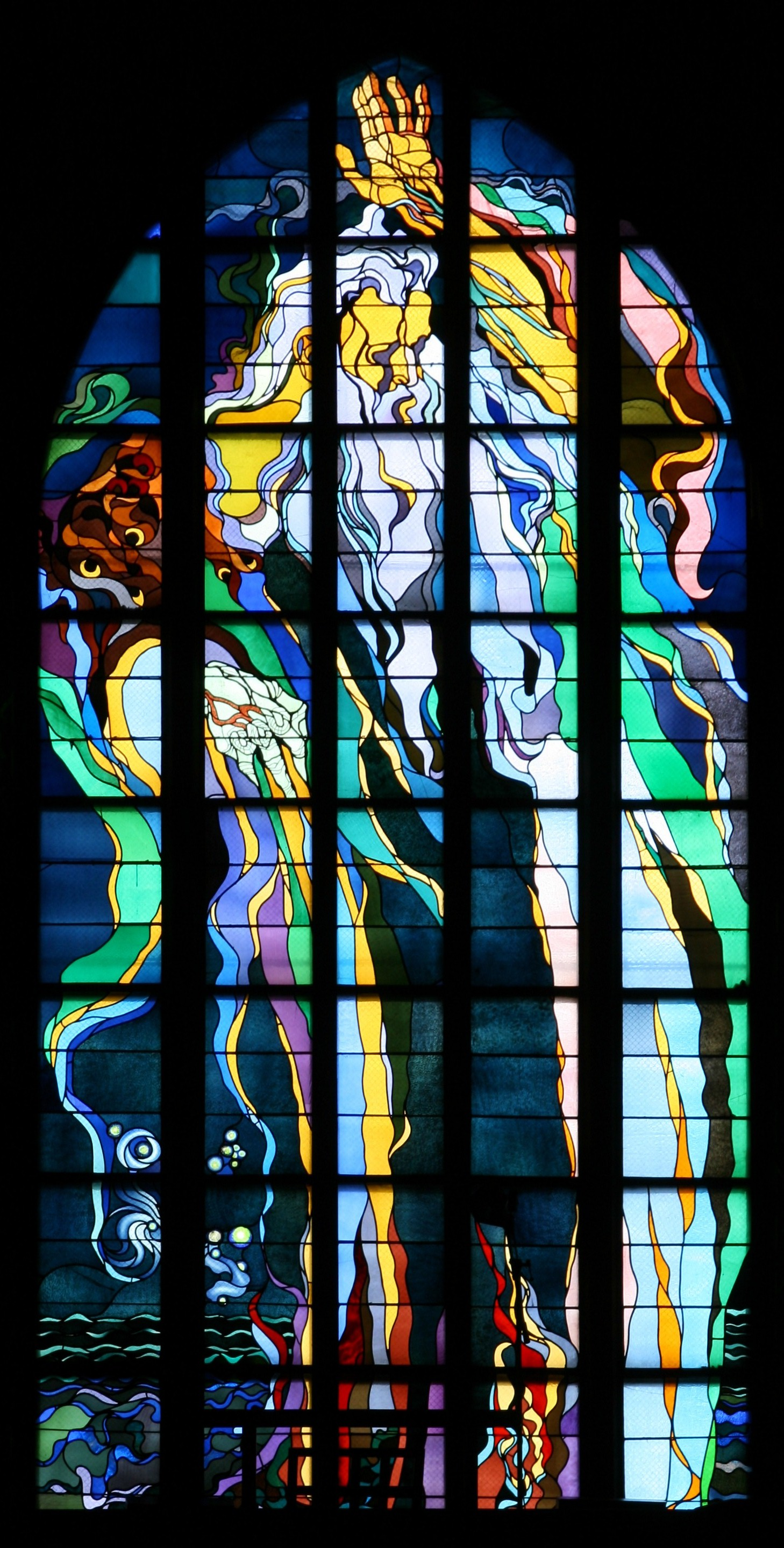
God the Creator by Stanisław Wyspiański, this window has no glass painting, but relies entirely on leadlines and skilful placement of colour and tone. Franciscan Church, Kraków, Poland (c. 1900).

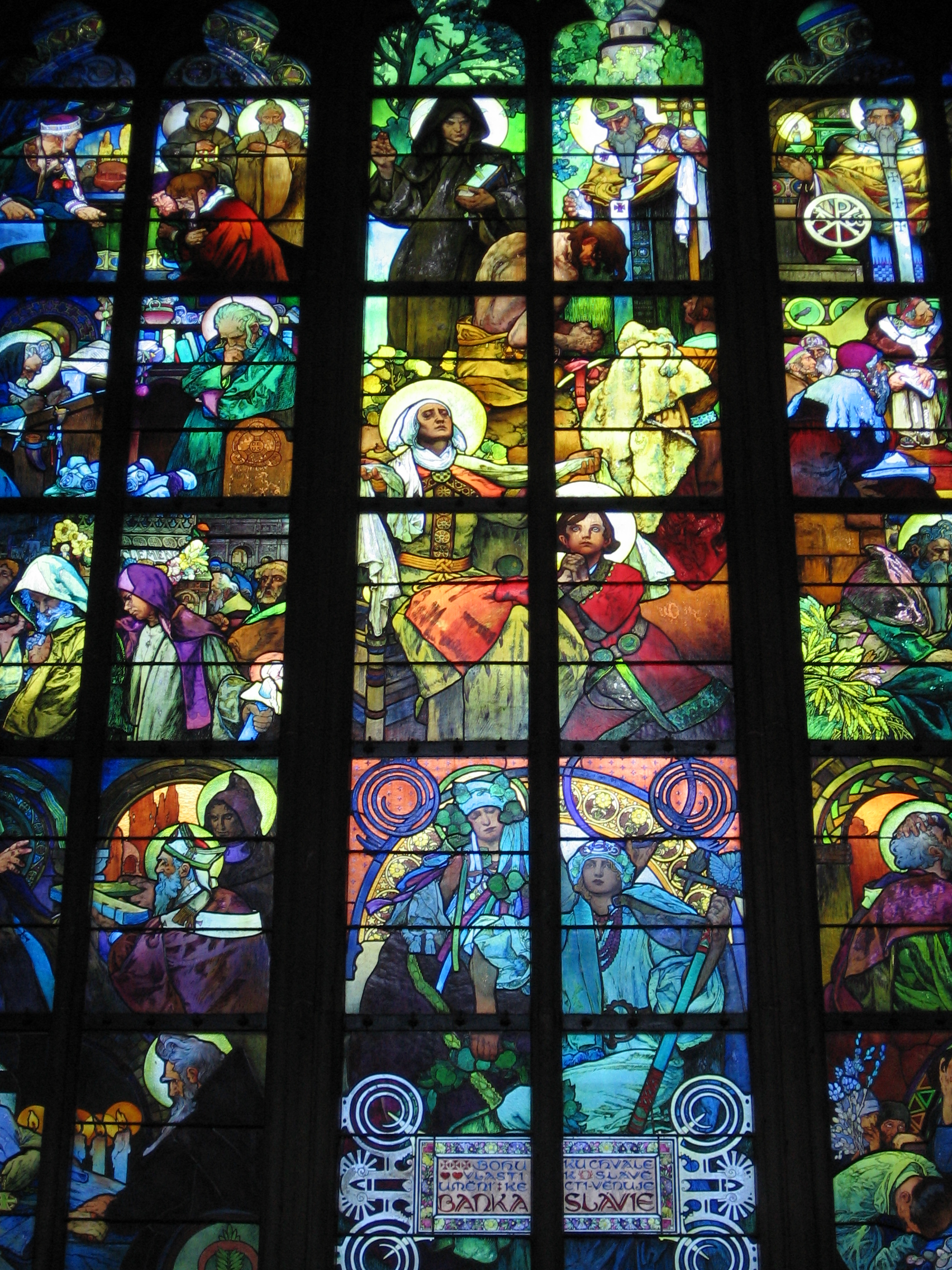
Window by Alfons Mucha, Saint Vitus Cathedral Prague, has a montage of images, rather than a tightly organised visual structure, creating an Expressionistic effect.

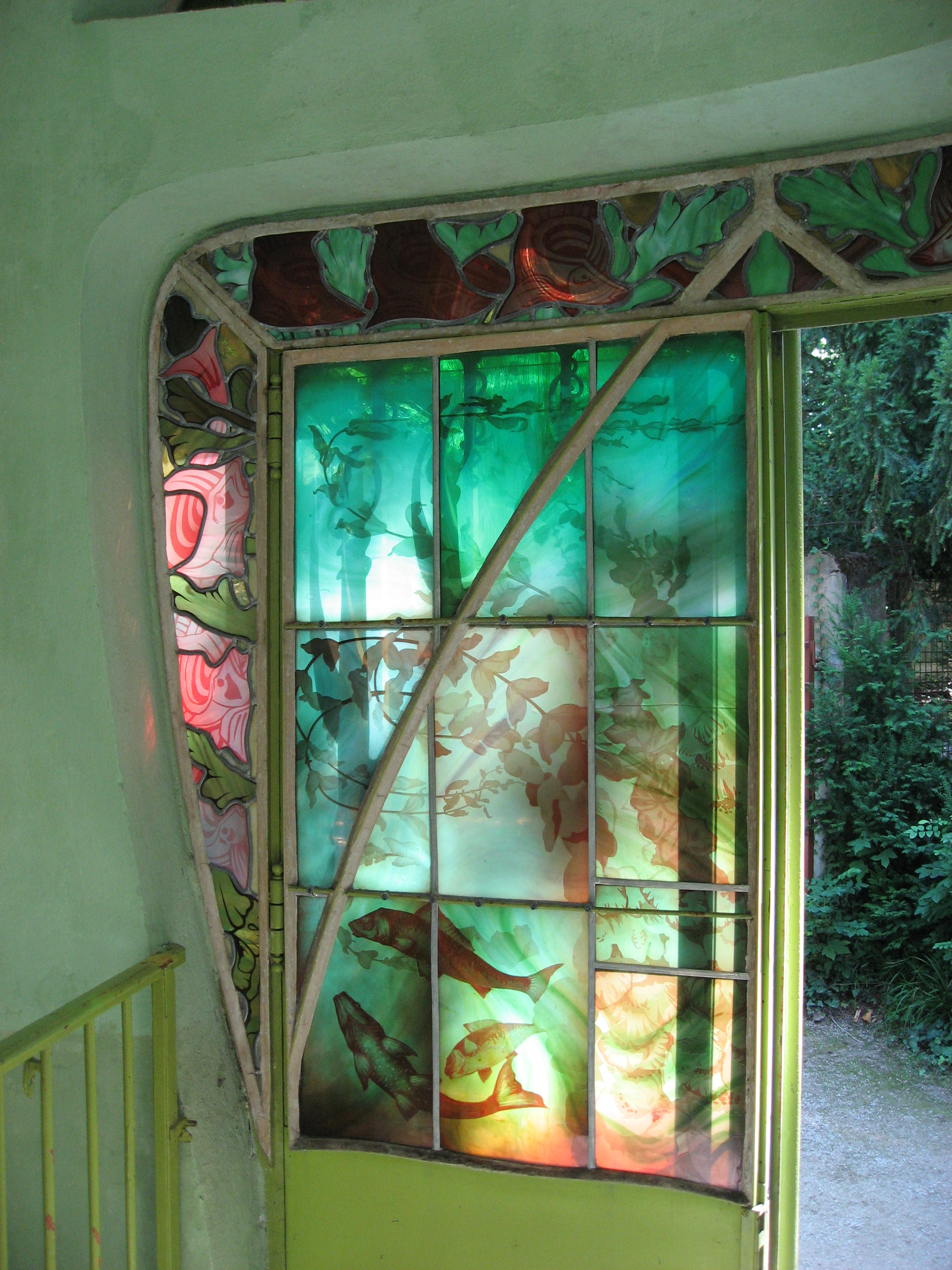
Art Nouveau by Jacques Grüber, the glass harmonising with the curving architectural forms that surround it, Musée de l'École de Nancy (1904)

=== Innovations in the United States ===
J&R Lamb Studios, established in 1857 in New York City, was the first major decorative arts studio in the United States and for many years a major producer of ecclesiastical stained glass.

Notable American practitioners include John La Farge (1835–1910), who invented opalescent glass and for which he received a U.S. patent on 24 February 1880, and Louis Comfort Tiffany (1848–1933), who received several patents for variations of the same opalescent process in November of the same year and he used the copper foil method as an alternative to lead in some windows, lamps and other decorations. Sanford Bray of Boston patented the use of copper foil in stained glass in 1886, However, a reaction against the aesthetics and technique of opalescent windows - led initially by architects such as Ralph Adams Cram - led to a rediscovery of traditional stained glass in the early 1900s. Charles J. Connick (1875–1945), who founded his Boston studio in 1913, was profoundly influenced by his study of medieval stained glass in Europe and by the Arts & Crafts philosophy of Englishman Christopher Whall. Connick created hundreds of windows throughout the US, including major glazing schemes at Princeton University Chapel (1927–29) and at Pittsburgh's Heinz Memorial Chapel (1937–38). Other American artist-makers who espoused a medieval-inspired idiom included Nicola D'Ascenzo of Philadelphia, Wilbur Burnham and Reynolds, Francis & Rohnstock of Boston and Henry Wynd Young and J. Gordon Guthrie of New York.

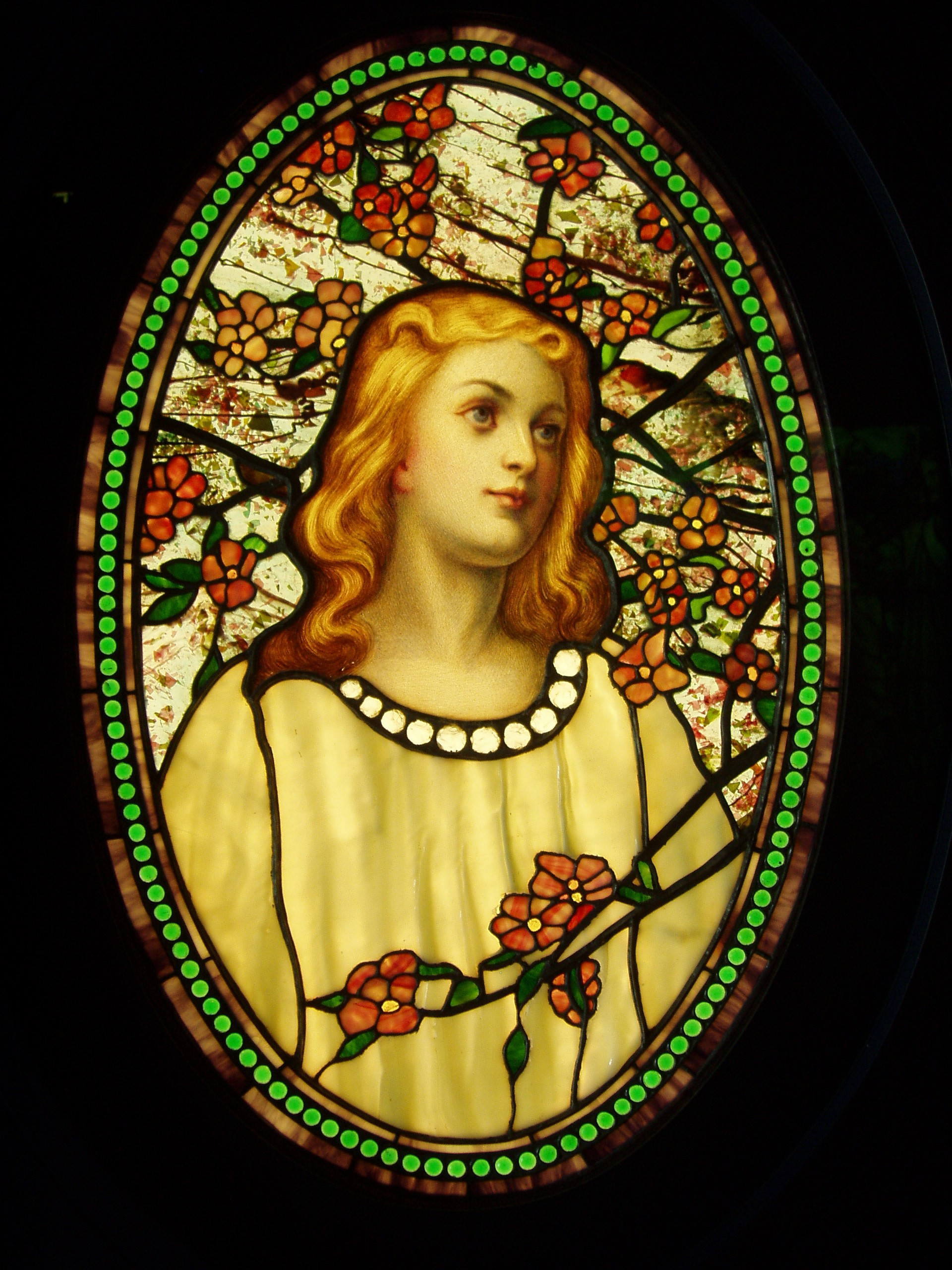
Many of the distinctive types of glass invented by Tiffany are demonstrated within this single small panel, including "fracture-streamer glass" and "drapery glass".

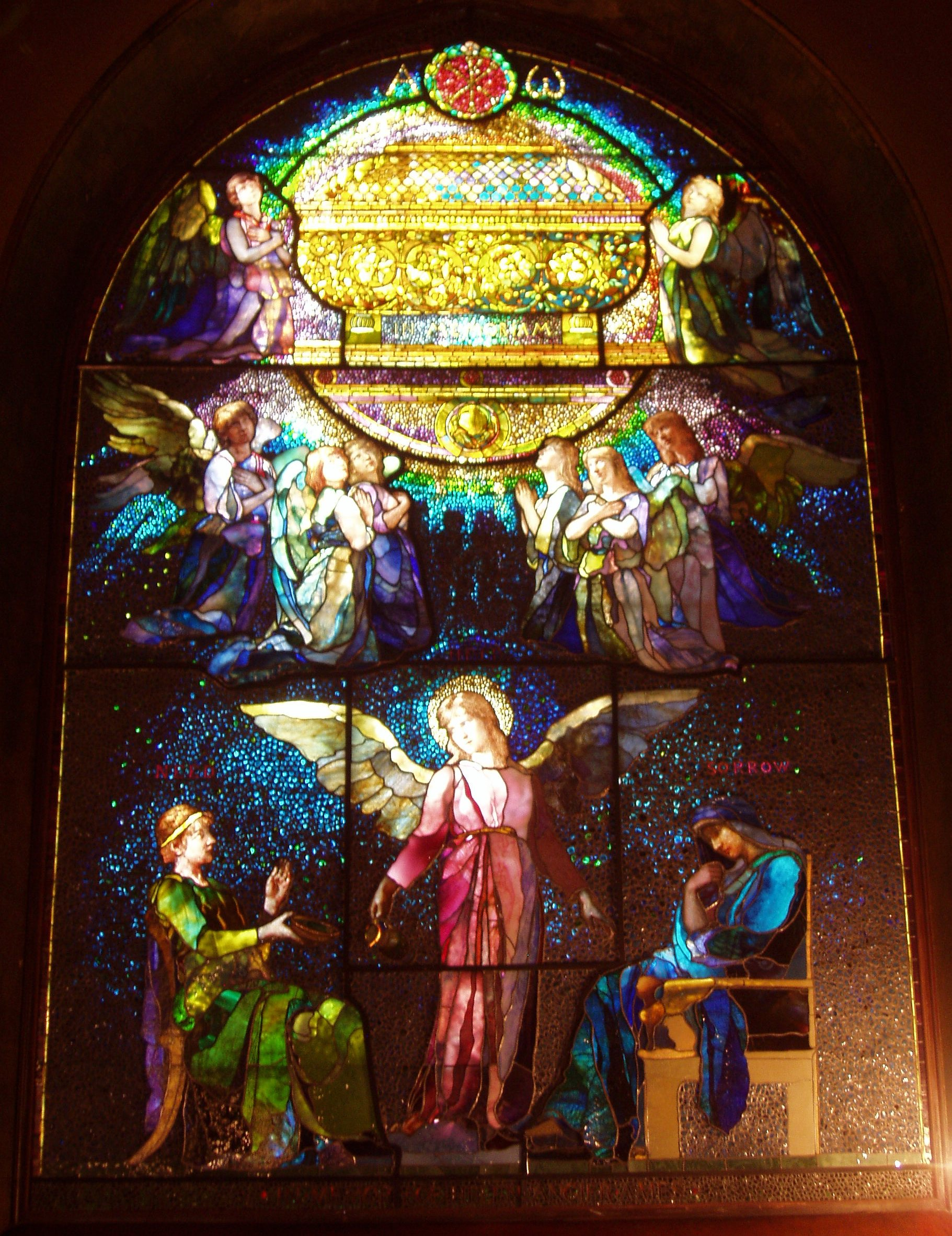
The Angel of Help, John La Farge, North Easton, MA, shows the use of tiny panes contrasting with large areas of opalescent glass. Window restored by Victor Rothman Stained Glass, Yonkers NY.

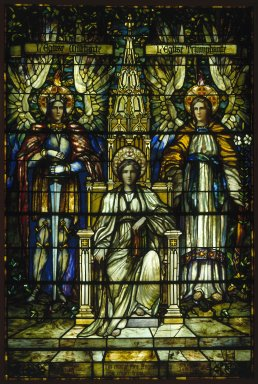
Religion Enthroned, J&R Lamb Studios, designer Frederick Stymetz Lamb (c. 1900). Brooklyn Museum. This piece features symmetrical design, "Aesthetic Style", a limited palette and extensive use of mottled glass.

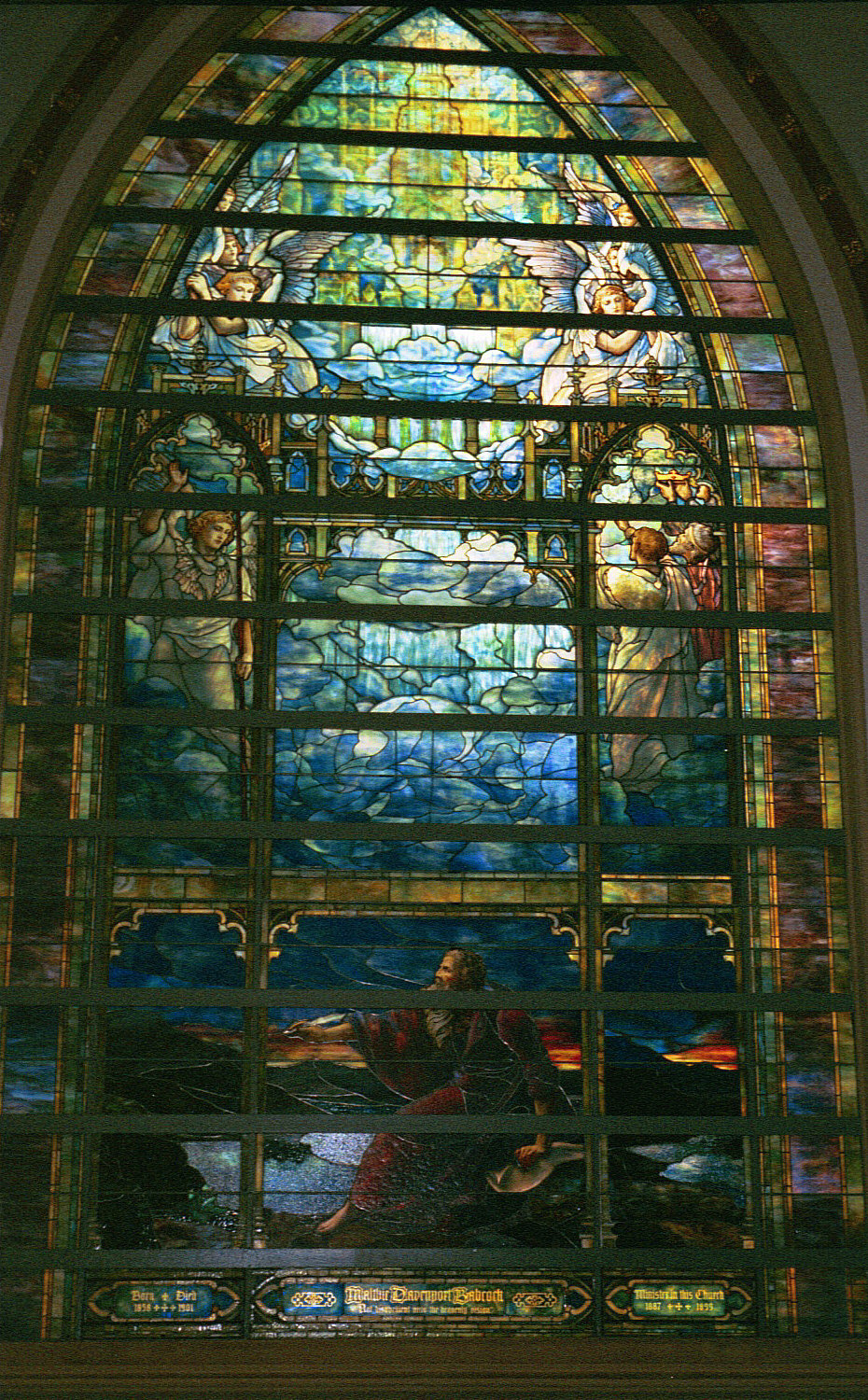
The Holy City by Louis Comfort Tiffany (1905). This 58-panel window has brilliant red, orange, and yellow etched glass for the sunrise, with textured glass used to create the effect of moving water.

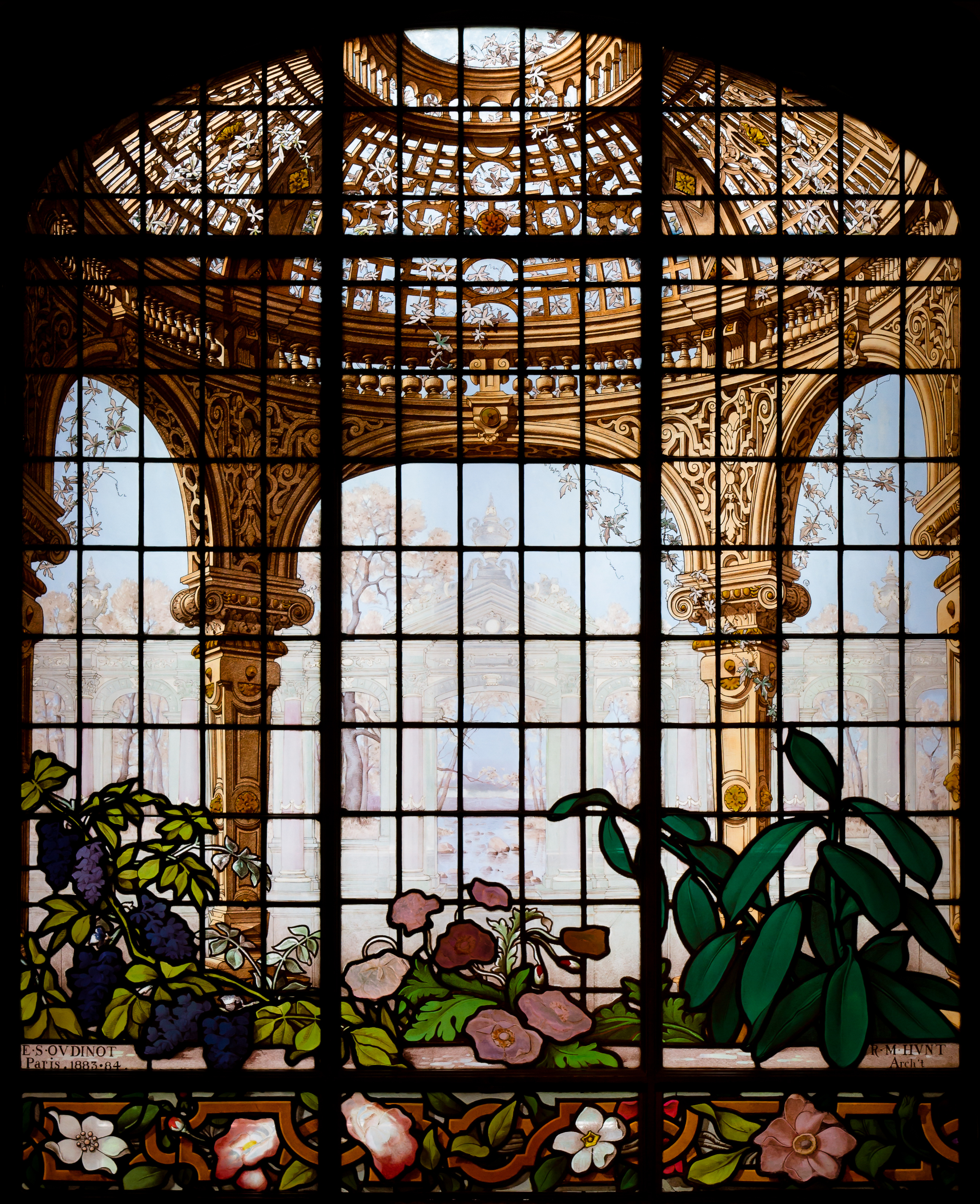
A trompe l'oeil glass (c. 1884), Eugène Stanislas Oudinot, design Richard Morris Hunt, for the home of Henry Gurdon Marquand, New York City

=== 20th and 21st centuries ===
Many 19th-century firms failed early in the 20th century as the Gothic movement was superseded by newer styles. At the same time there were also some interesting developments where stained glass artists took studios in shared facilities. Examples include the Glass House in London, set up by Mary Lowndes and Alfred J. Drury and An Túr Gloine in Dublin, which was run by Sarah Purser and included artists such as Harry Clarke.

A revival occurred in the middle of the century because of a desire to restore thousands of church windows throughout Europe destroyed as a result of World War II bombing. German artists led the way. Much work of the period is mundane and often was not made by its designers, but industrially produced.

Other artists sought to transform an ancient art form into a contemporary one, sometimes using traditional techniques while exploiting the medium of glass in innovative ways and in combination with different materials. The use of slab glass, a technique known as dalle de verre, where the glass is set in concrete or epoxy resin, was a 20th-century innovation credited to Jean Gaudin and brought to the UK by Pierre Fourmaintraux. One of the most prolific glass artists using this technique was the Benedictine monk Dom Charles Norris OSB of Buckfast Abbey.

Gemmail, a technique developed by the French artist Jean Crotti in 1936 and perfected in the 1950s, is a type of stained glass where adjacent pieces of glass are overlapped without using lead cames to join the pieces, allowing for greater diversity and subtlety of colour. Many famous works by late 19th- and early 20th-century painters, notably Picasso, have been reproduced in gemmail. A major exponent of this technique is the German artist Walter Womacka.

Among the early well-known 20th-century artists who experimented with stained glass as an abstract art form were Theo van Doesburg and Piet Mondrian. In the 1960s and 1970s, the Expressionist painter Marc Chagall produced designs for many stained-glass windows that are intensely coloured and crammed with symbolic details. Important 20th-century stained glass artists include John Hayward, Douglas Strachan, Ervin Bossanyi, Louis Davis, Wilhelmina Geddes, Karl Parsons, John Piper, Patrick Reyntiens, Johannes Schreiter, Brian Clarke, Paul Woodroffe, Jean René Bazaine at Saint Séverin, Sergio de Castro at Couvrechef- La Folie (Caen), Hamburg-Dulsberg and Romont (Switzerland), and the Loire Studio of Gabriel Loire at Chartres. The west windows of England's Manchester Cathedral, by Tony Hollaway, are some of the most notable examples of symbolic work.

In Germany, stained glass development continued with the inter-war work of Johan Thorn Prikker and Josef Albers, and the post-war achievements of Georg Meistermann, Joachim Klos, Johannes Schreiter and Ludwig Schaffrath. This group of artists, who advanced the medium through the abandonment of figurative designs and painting on glass in favour of a mix of biomorphic and rigorously geometric abstraction, and the calligraphic non-functional use of leads, are described as having produced "the first authentic school of stained glass since the Middle Ages". The works of Ludwig Schaffrath demonstrate the late 20th-century trends in the use of stained glass for architectural purposes, filling entire walls with coloured and textured glass. In the 1970s young British stained-glass artists such as Brian Clarke were influenced by the large scale and abstraction in German twentieth-century glass.

In the UK, the professional organisation for stained glass artists has been the British Society of Master Glass Painters, founded in 1921. Since 1924 the BSMGP has published an annual journal, The Journal of Stained Glass. It continues to be Britain's only organisation devoted exclusively to the art and craft of stained glass. From the outset, its chief objectives have been to promote and encourage high standards in stained glass painting and staining, to act as a locus for the exchange of information and ideas within the stained glass craft and to preserve the invaluable stained glass heritage of Britain.

After the First World War, stained-glass window memorials were a popular choice among wealthier families. Examples can be found in churches across the UK.

In the United States, there is a 100-year-old trade organization, The Stained Glass Association of America, whose purpose is to function as a publicly recognized organization to assure survival of the craft by offering guidelines, instruction and training to craftspersons. The SGAA also sees its role as defending and protecting its craft against regulations that might restrict its freedom as an architectural art form. The current president is Kathy Bernard. Today there are academic establishments that teach the traditional skills. One of these is Florida State University's Master Craftsman Program, which recently completed a 30 ft (9.1 m) high stained-glass windows, designed by Robert Bischoff, the program's director, and Jo Ann, his wife and installed to overlook Bobby Bowden Field at Doak Campbell Stadium. The Roots of Knowledge installation at Utah Valley University in Orem, Utah is 200 feet (61 m) long and has been compared to those in several European cathedrals, including the Cologne Cathedral in Germany, Sainte-Chapelle in France, and York Minster in England. There are also contemporary stained glass artists in the US who create stained-glass windows based on grids, rather than recognizable images.

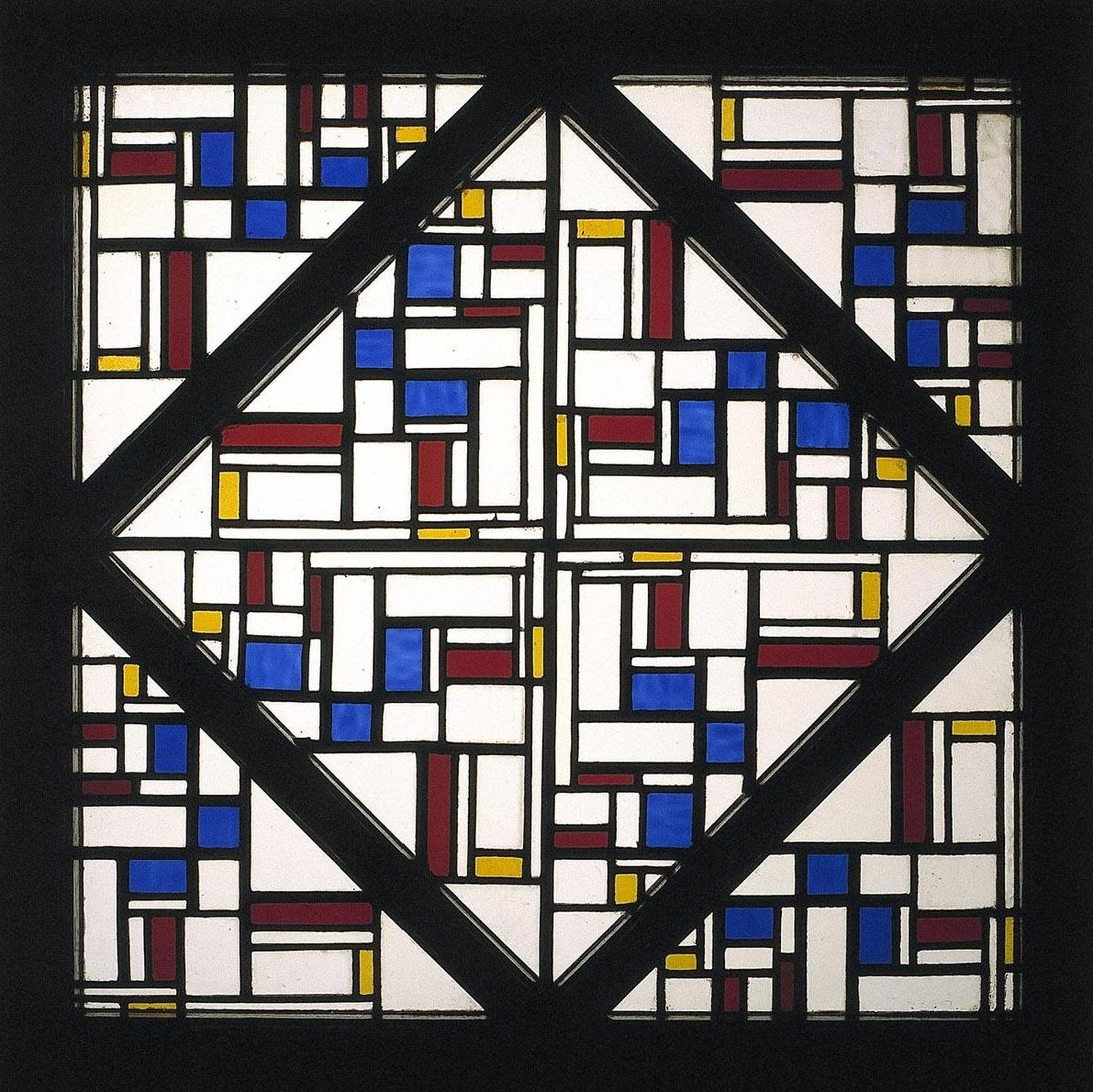
De Stijl abstraction by Theo van Doesburg, Netherlands (1917)

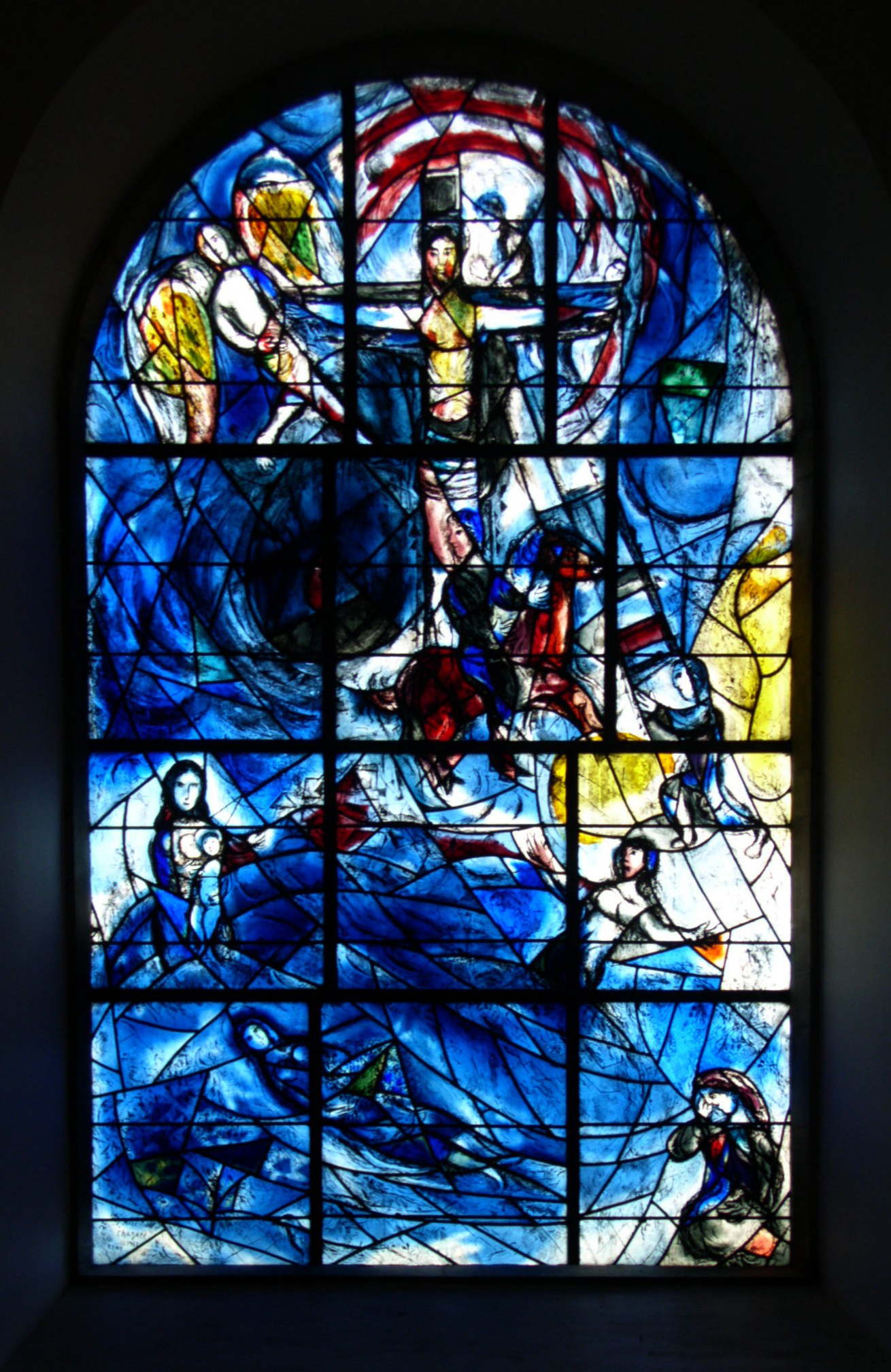
Expressionist window by Marc Chagall, at All Saints' Church, Tudeley, Kent, UK

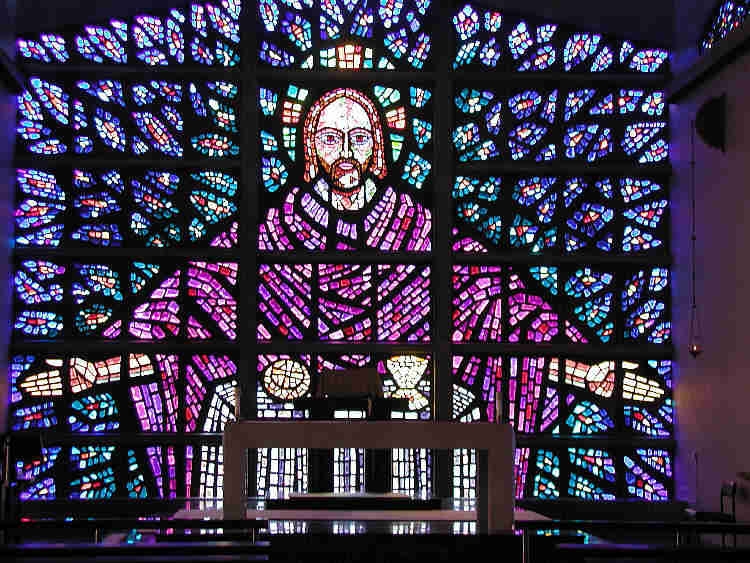
Christ of the Eucharist, slab glass designed by Dom Charles Norris from Buckfast Abbey, Devon, UK

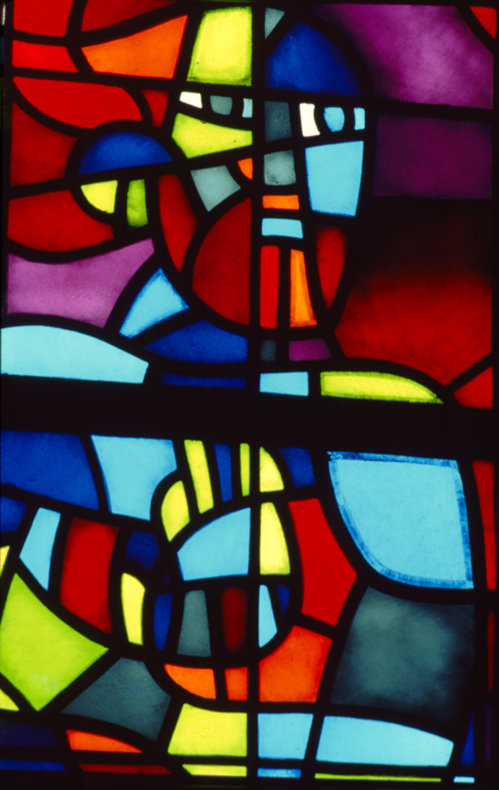
Abstract, detail of Jonah window by Sergio de Castro for the Collegiate of Romont, Switzerland

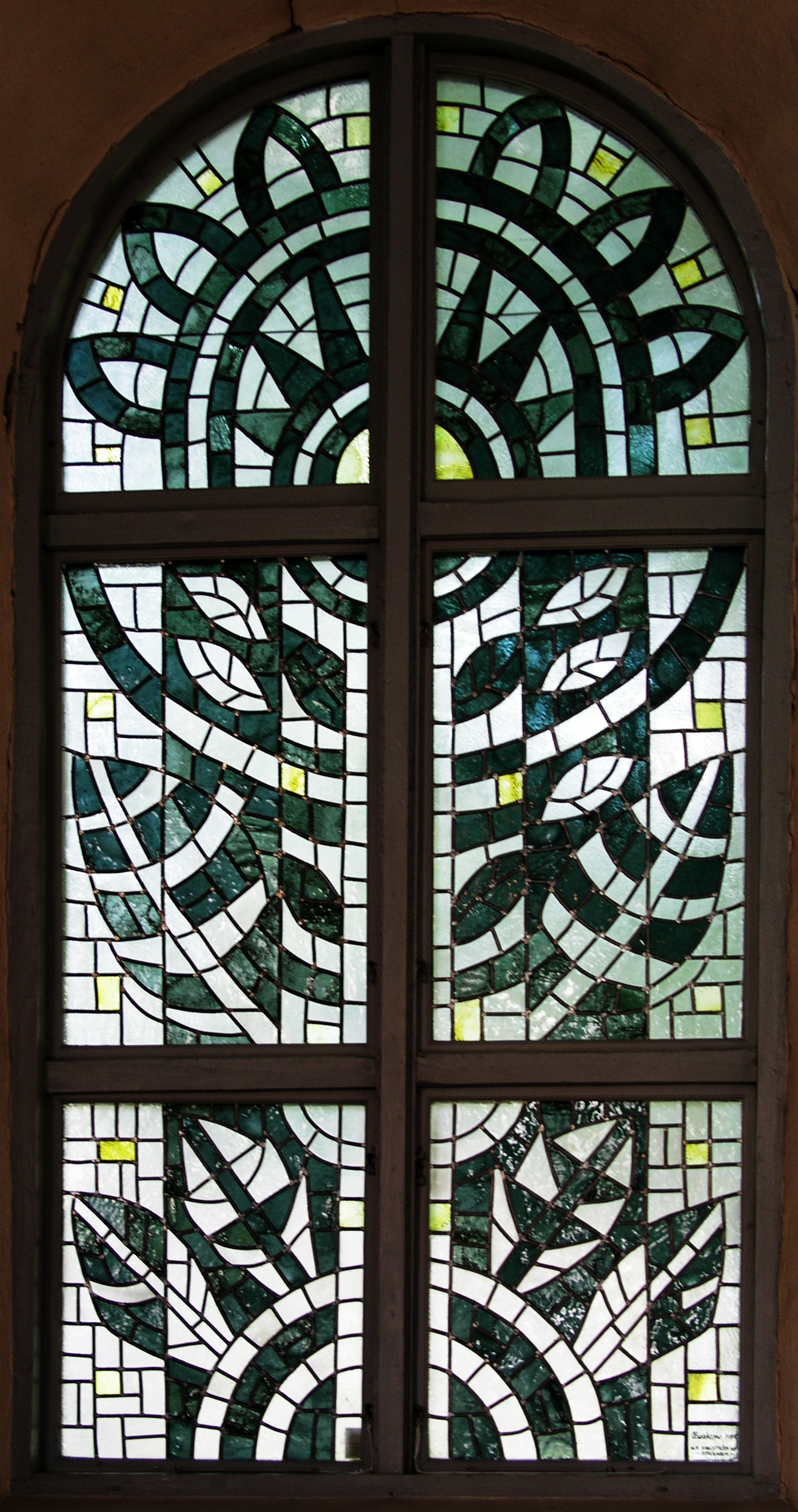
Postmodernist symbolism, Tree of Life at Christinae Church, Alingsås, Sweden

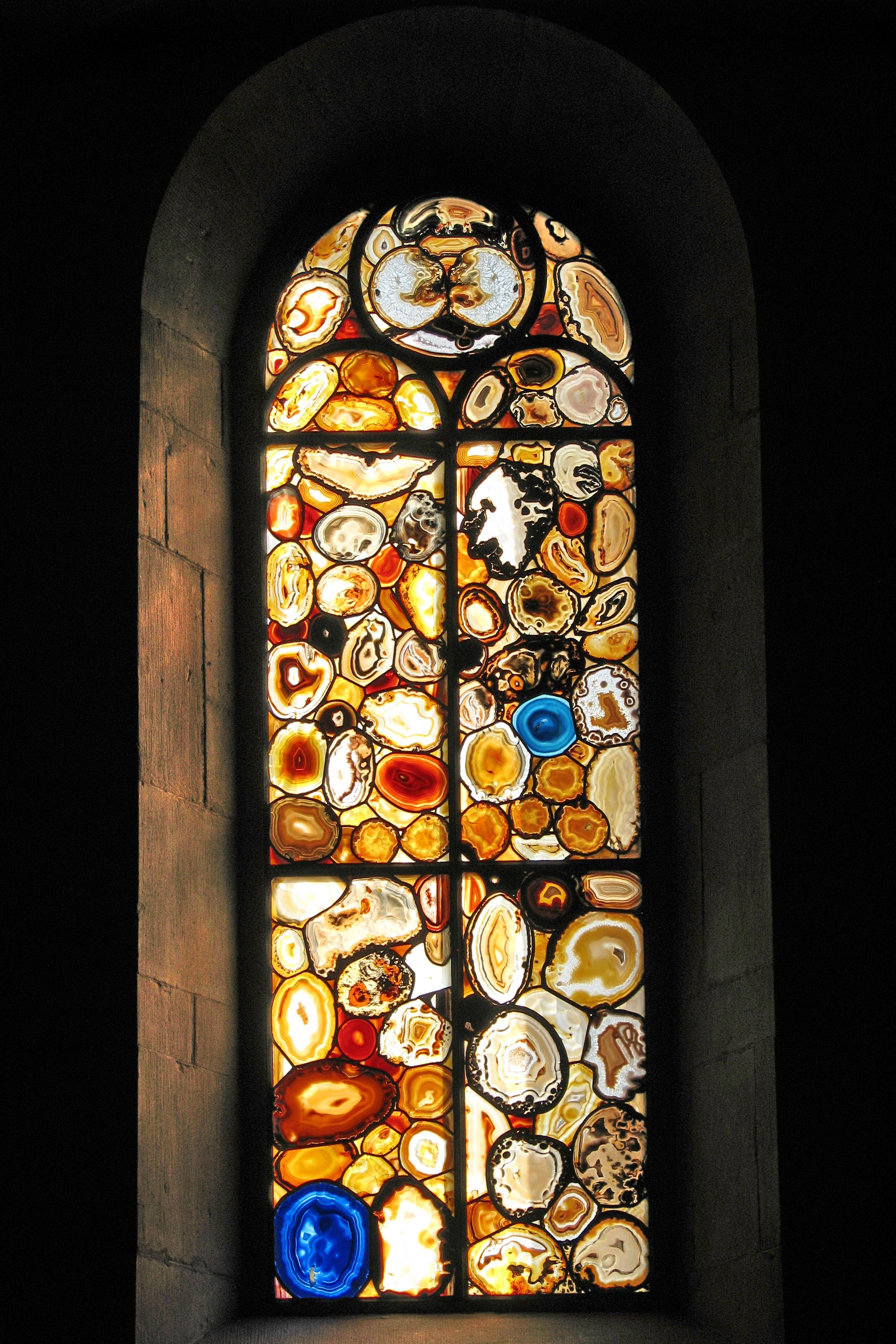
Thin slices of agate set into lead and glass by Sigmar Polke, Grossmünster, Zürich, Switzerland (2009)

=== Combining ancient and modern traditions ===
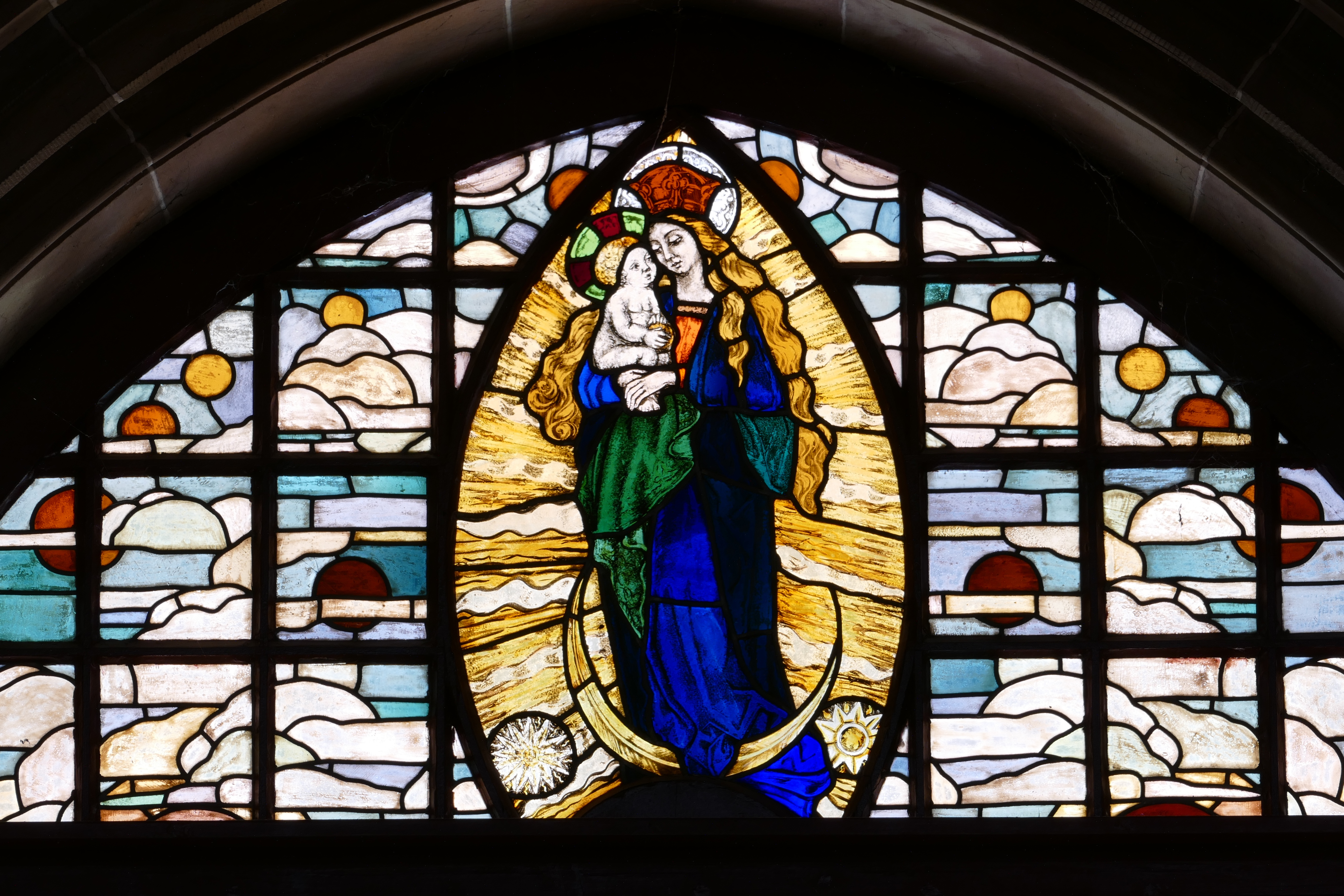
Madonna and Child by Joseph Ehrismann, late 1910s. (Église Saint-André, Meistratzheim). Combines a traditional representation in a mandorla with an Art Nouveau style celestial background.

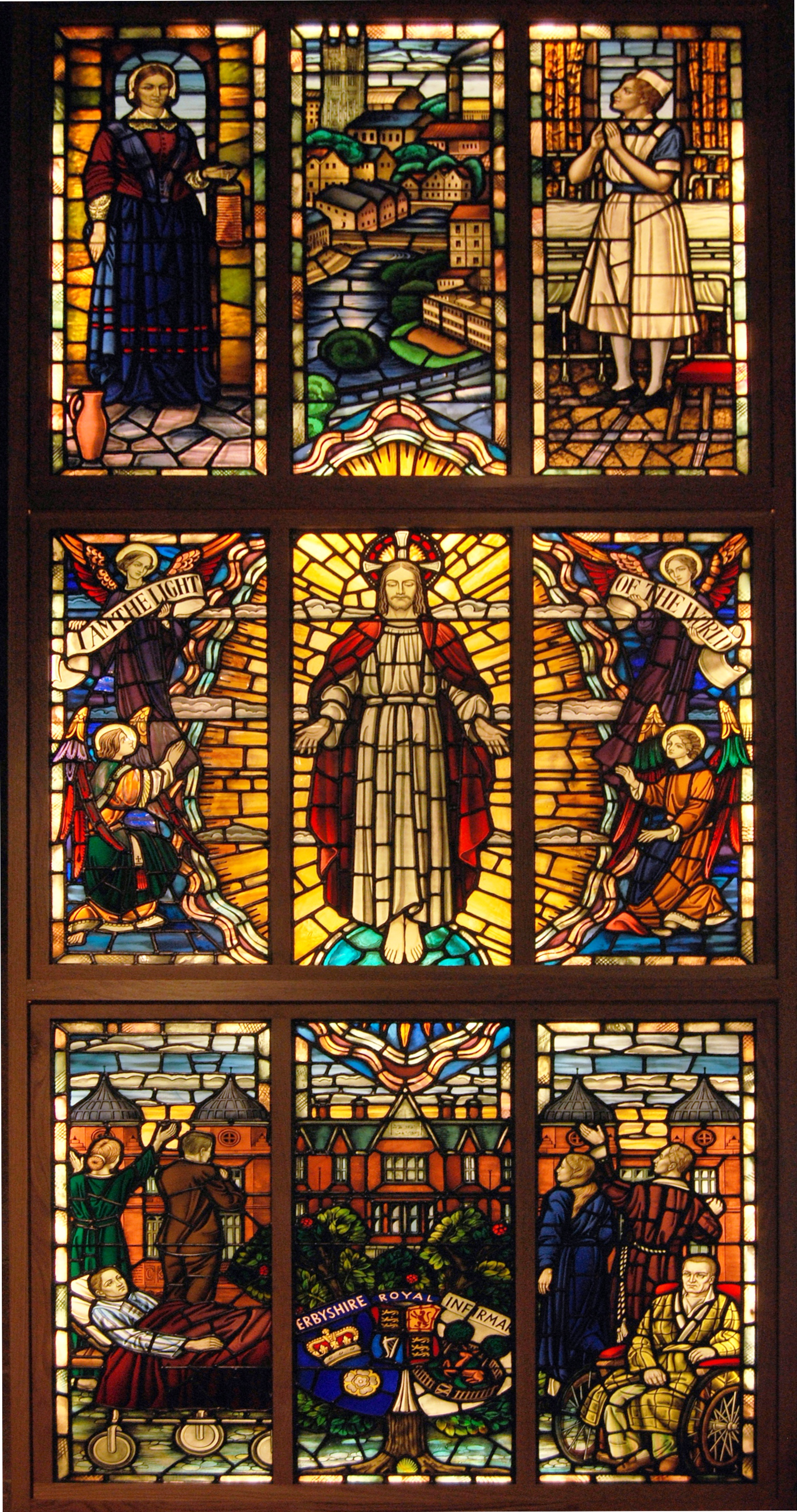
Mid-20th-century window showing a continuation of ancient and 19th-century methods applied to a modern historical subject. Florence Nightingale window at St Peters, Derby, made for the Derbyshire Royal Infirmary

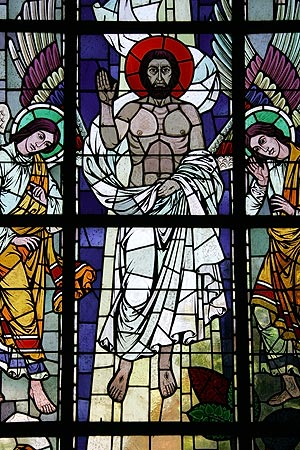
Figurative design using the lead lines and minimal glass paint in the 13th-century manner combined with the texture of Cathedral glass, Ins, Switzerland

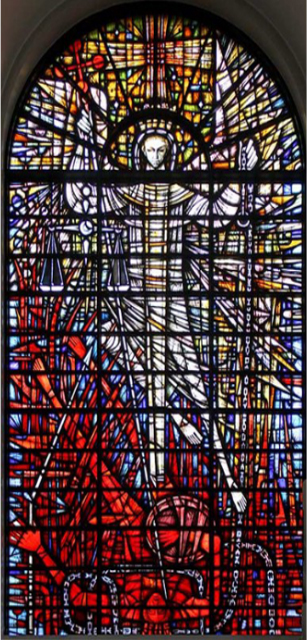
St Michael and the Devil at the church of St Michael Paternoster Row, by English artist John Hayward, combines traditional methods with a distinctive use of shard-like sections of glass.

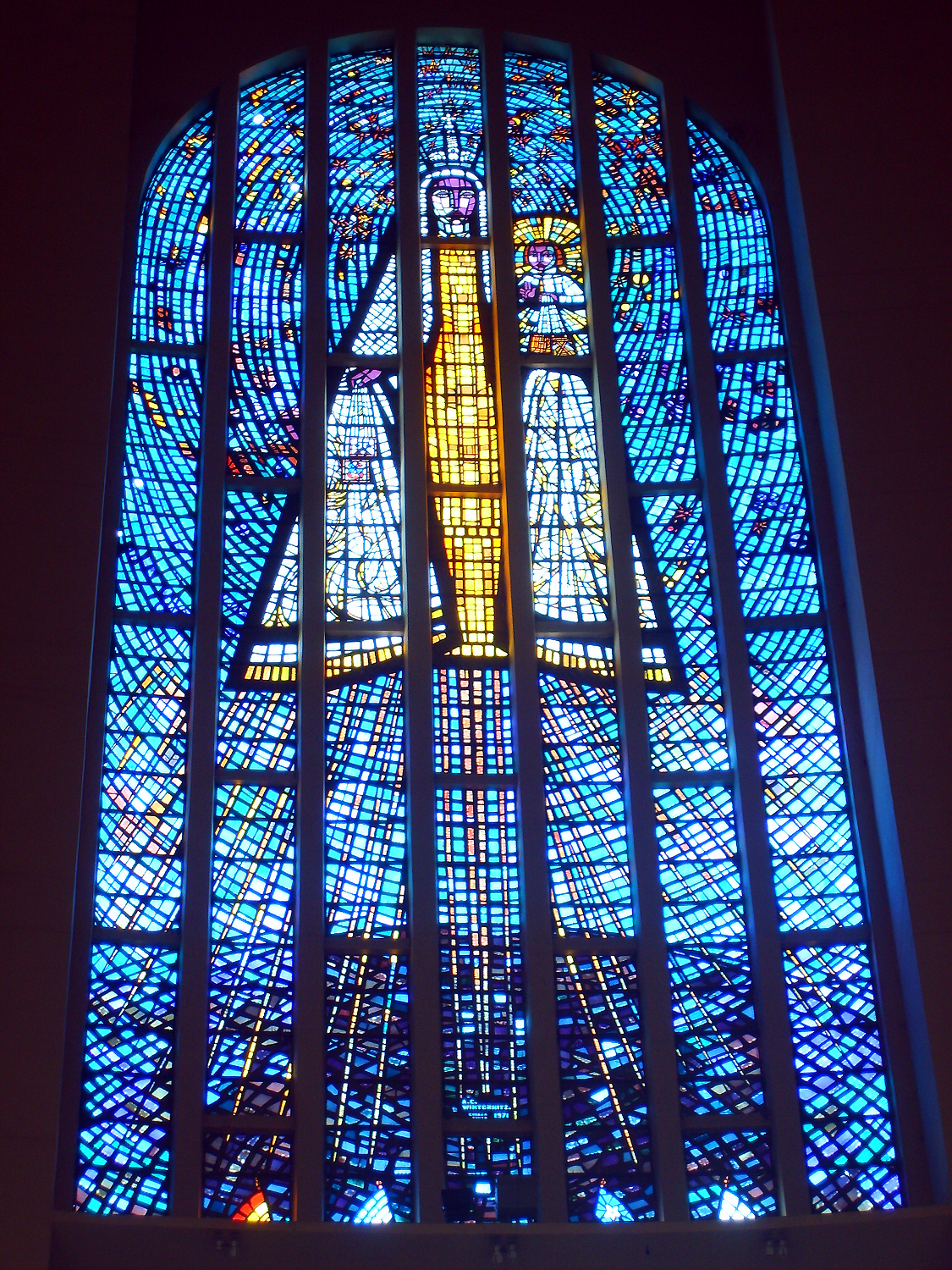
The principal window of the Temple of Maipú, Chile, depicting the Virgin Mary and Christ Child, by Adolfo Winternitz, showing the traditional use of blue as the predominant colour, emphasising an association with Heaven

== Buildings incorporating stained-glass windows ==
=== Churches ===
Stained-glass windows were commonly used in churches for decorative and informative purposes. Many windows are donated to churches by members of the congregation as memorials of loved ones. For more on the use of stained glass to depict religious subjects, see Poor Man's Bible.

Important examples of stained-glass windows in churches include:

- Cathedral of Chartres, in France, 11th to 13th-century glass
- Canterbury Cathedral, in England, 12th to 15th century plus 19th- and 20th-century glass
- York Minster, in England, 11th to 15th-century glass
- Sainte-Chapelle, in Paris, 13th and 14th-century glass
- Bourges Cathedral in France, 13th to 16th-century glass
- Florence Cathedral, Italy, 15th-century glass designed by Uccello, Donatello and Ghiberti
- Janskerk (Gouda), The Netherlands, date from 1555 to the early 1600s; the earliest is the work of Dirck Crabeth and his brother Wouter.
- St. Andrew's Cathedral, Sydney, Australia, early complete cycle of 19th-century glass, Hardman of Birmingham.
- Fribourg Cathedral, Switzerland, complete cycle of glass 1896–1936, by Józef Mehoffer
- Coventry Cathedral, England, mid-20th-century glass by various designers, the large baptistry window being by John Piper
- Brown Memorial Presbyterian Church, extensive collection of windows by Louis Comfort Tiffany

=== Synagogues ===
In addition to Christian churches, stained-glass windows have been incorporated into Jewish temple architecture for centuries. Stained-glass windows in synagogues began to emerge in Jewish communities in the United States in the mid-19th century, with such notable examples as the sanctuary depiction of the Ten Commandments in New York's Congregation Anshi Chesed. From the mid-20th century to the present, stained-glass windows have been a ubiquitous feature of American synagogue architecture. Styles and themes for synagogue stained-glass artwork are as diverse as their church counterparts. As with churches, synagogue stained-glass windows are often dedicated by member families in exchange for major financial contributions to the institution.

=== Places of worship ===
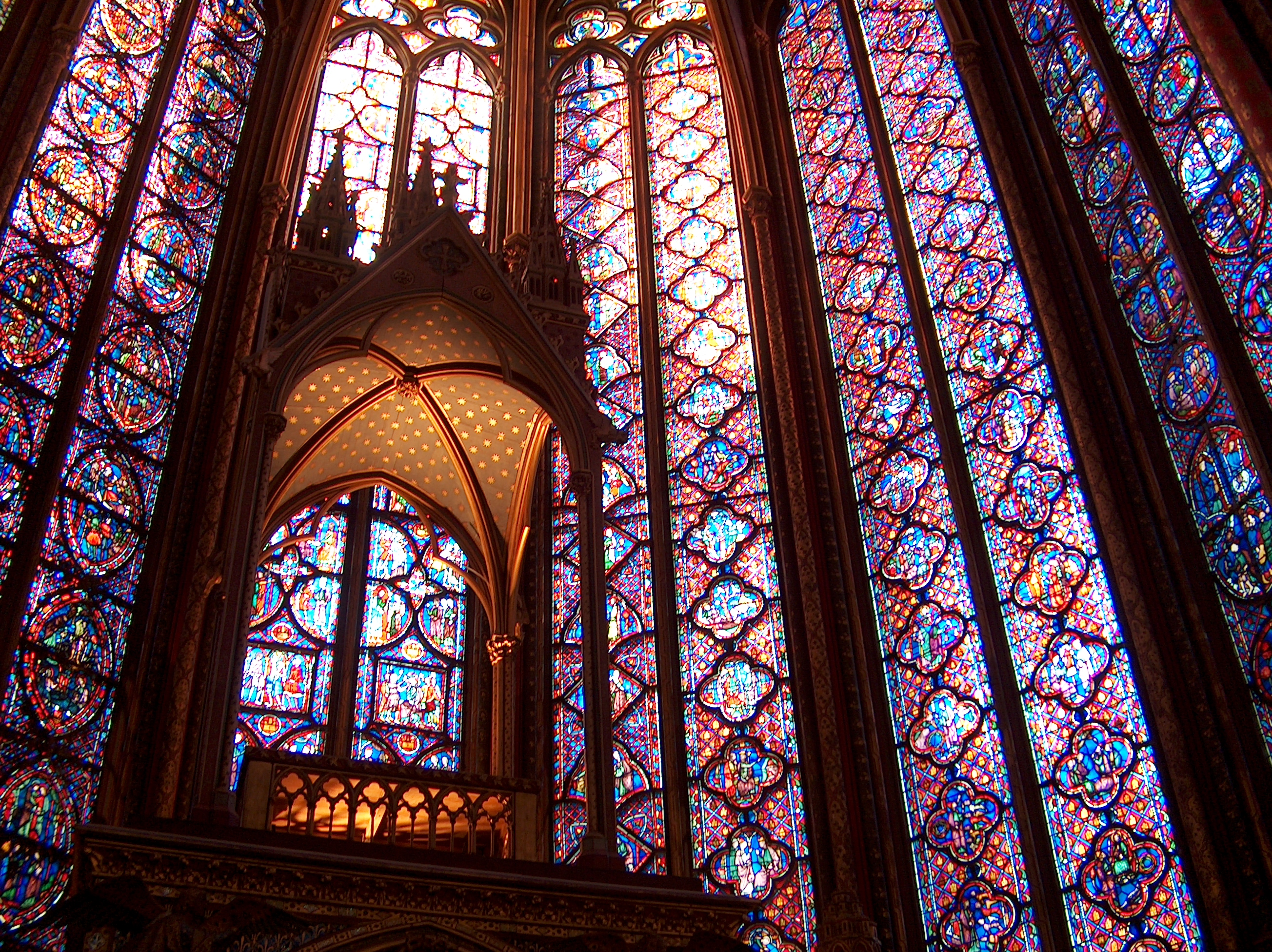
Medieval glass at Sainte-Chapelle, Paris

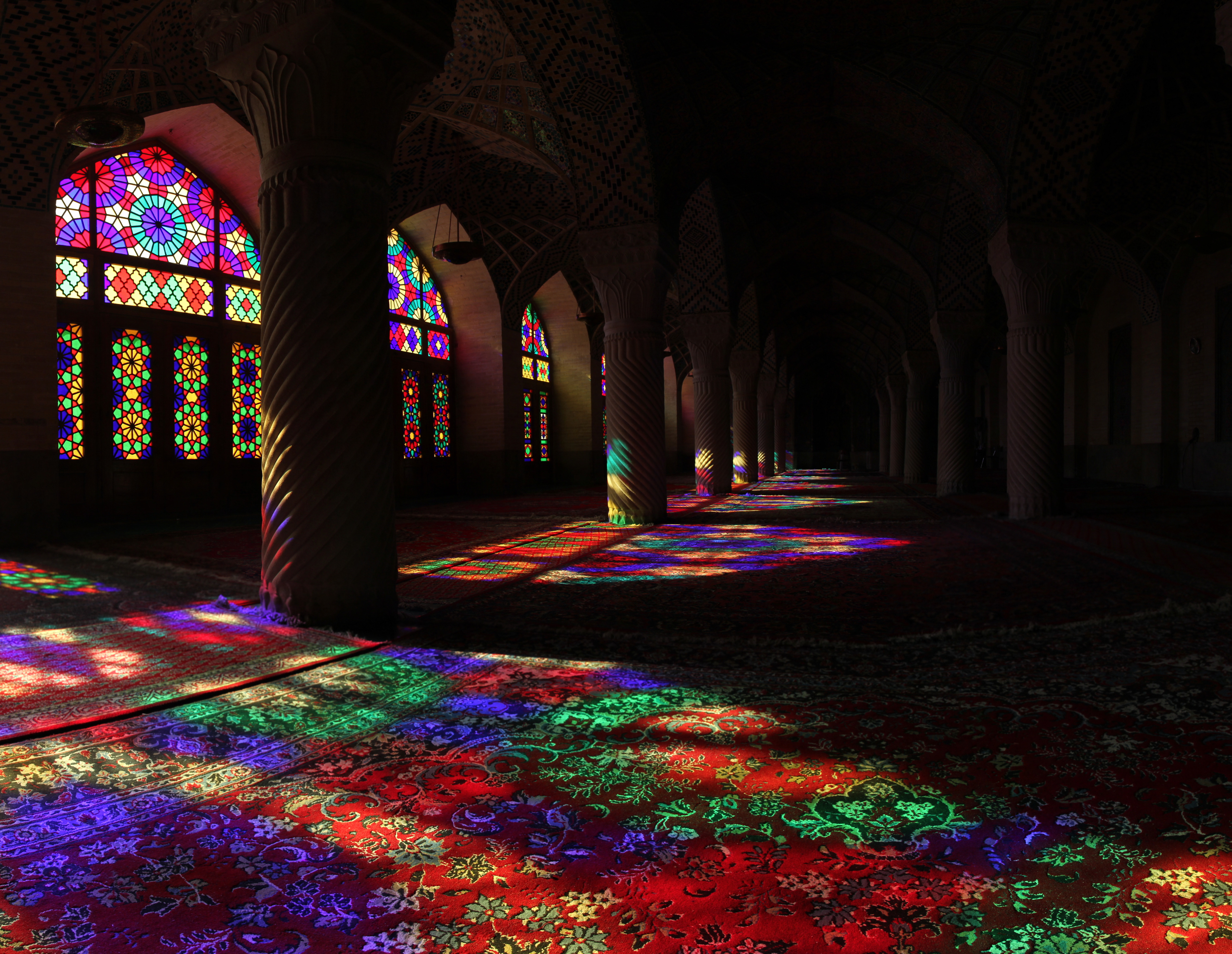
Sunlight shining through stained glass onto the coloured carpet of Nasir ol Molk Mosque, Shiraz

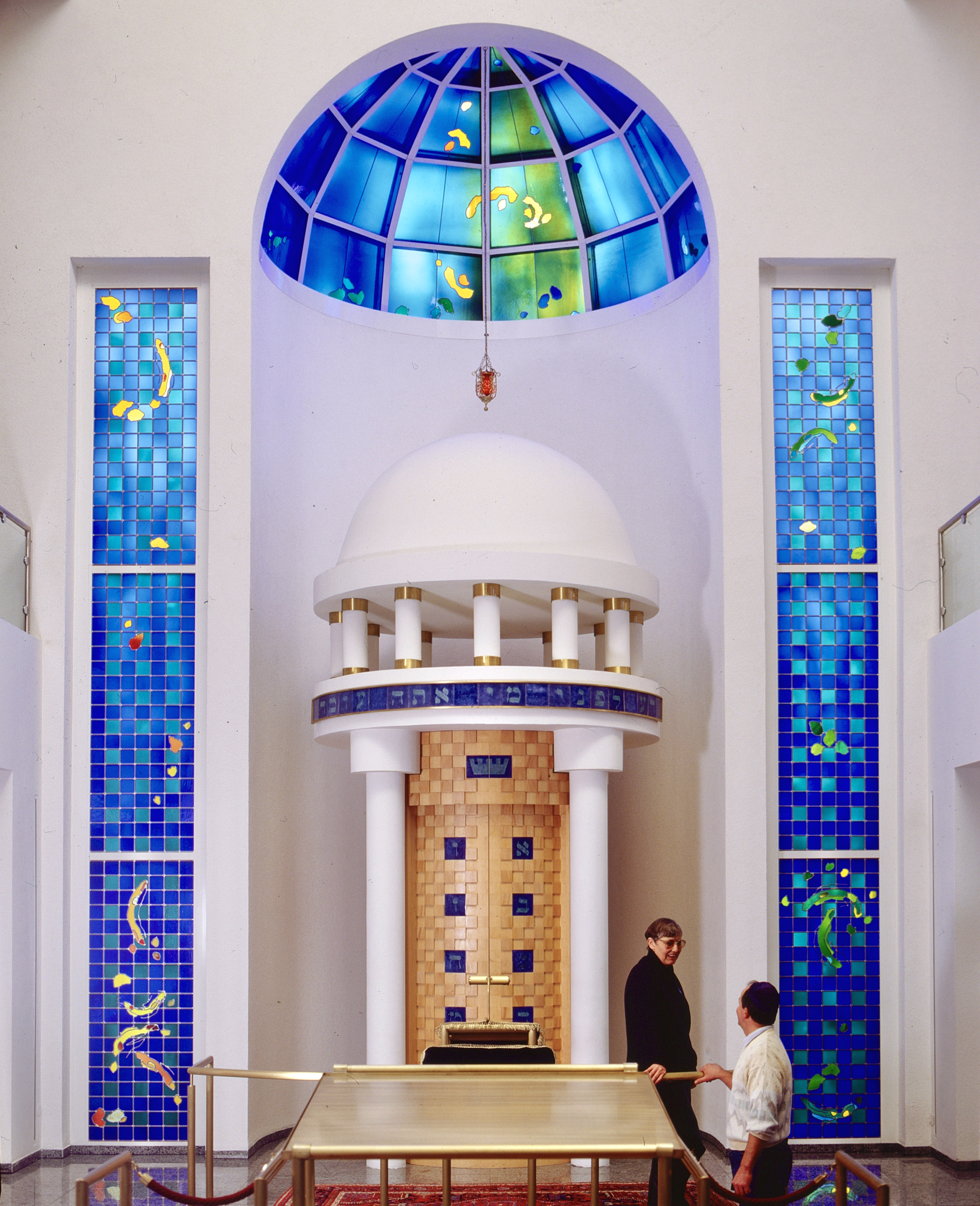
The stained-glass windows and dome flanking the Torah ark of the Holocaust Memorial Synagogue, Darmstadt, designed by artist Brian Clarke

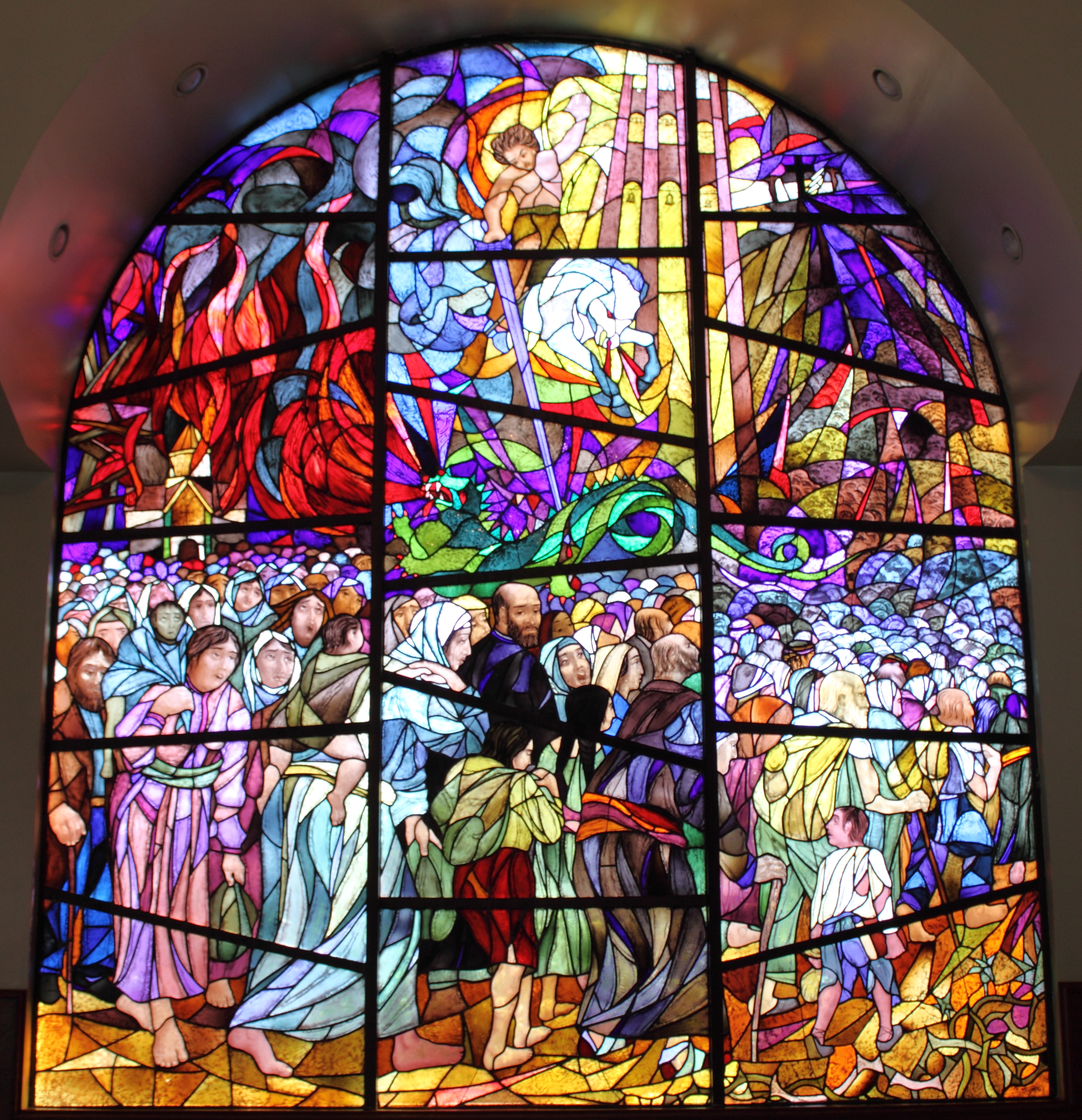
Stained glass window in the Surp Garabed Armenian Church, located in Little Armenia, Los Angeles

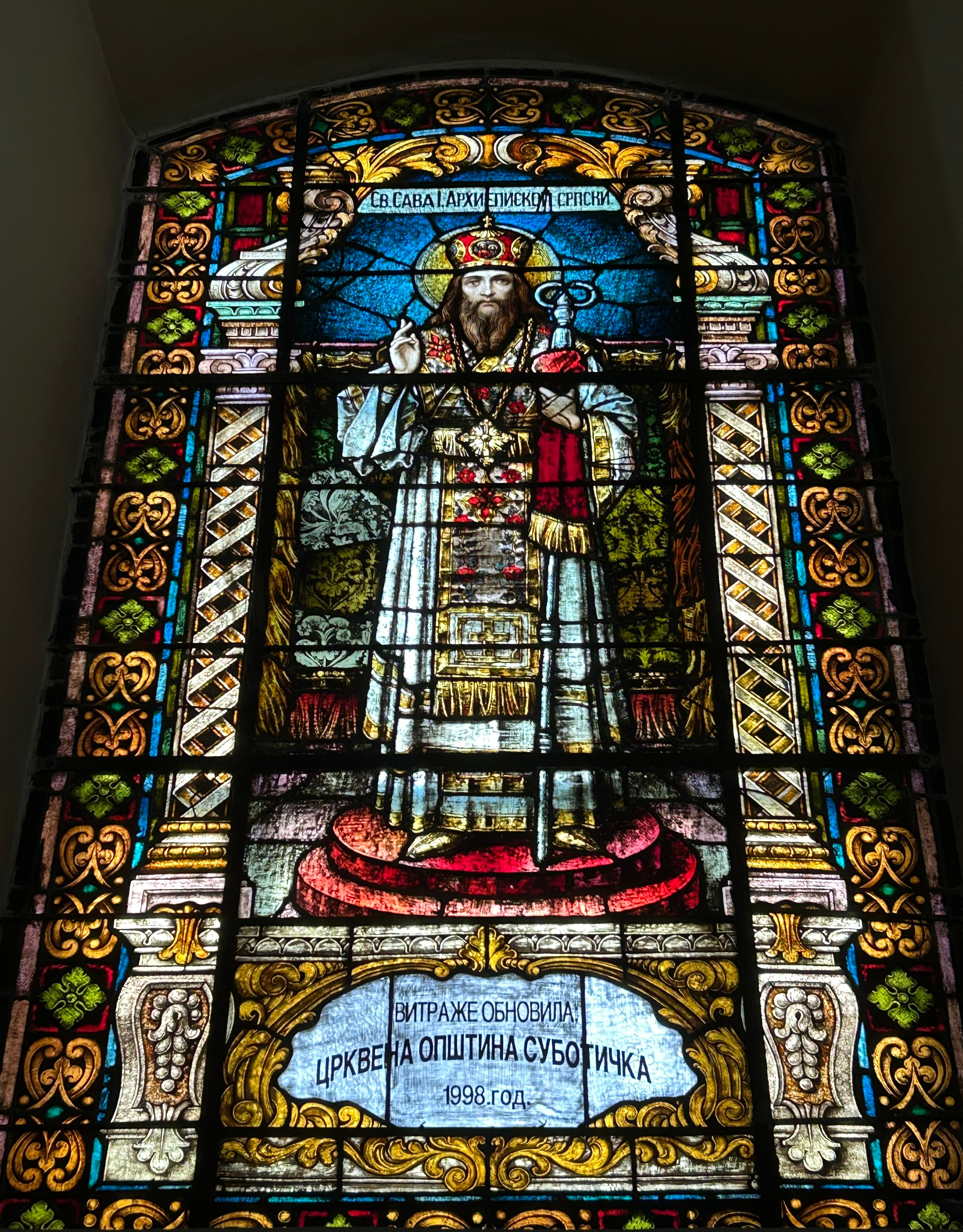
The Stained Glass of Saint Sava, Serbian Orthodox Church of the Ascension of the Lord in Subotica

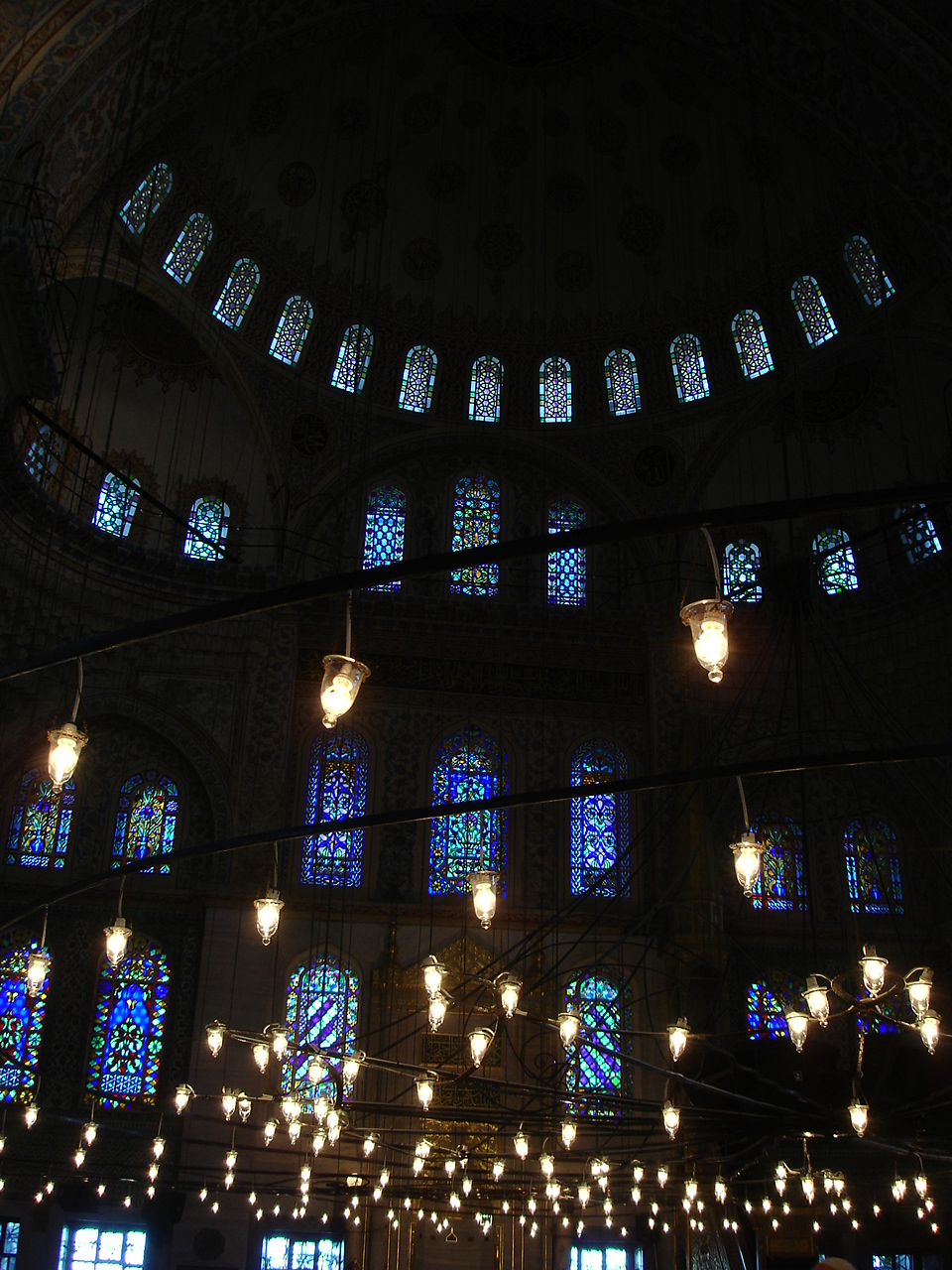
Interior of the Blue Mosque, Istanbul

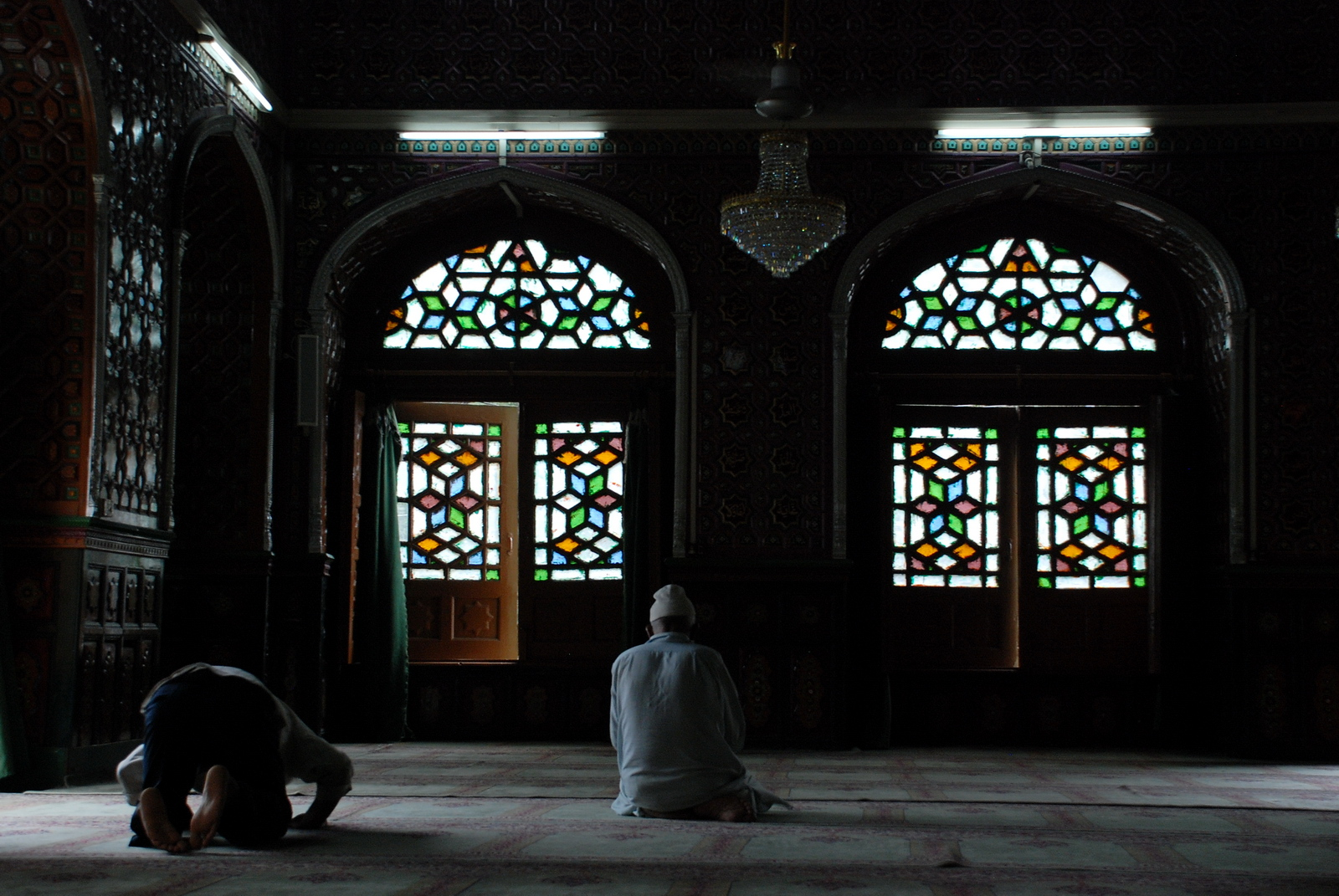
Stained-glass windows in the Mosque of Srinagar, Kashmir

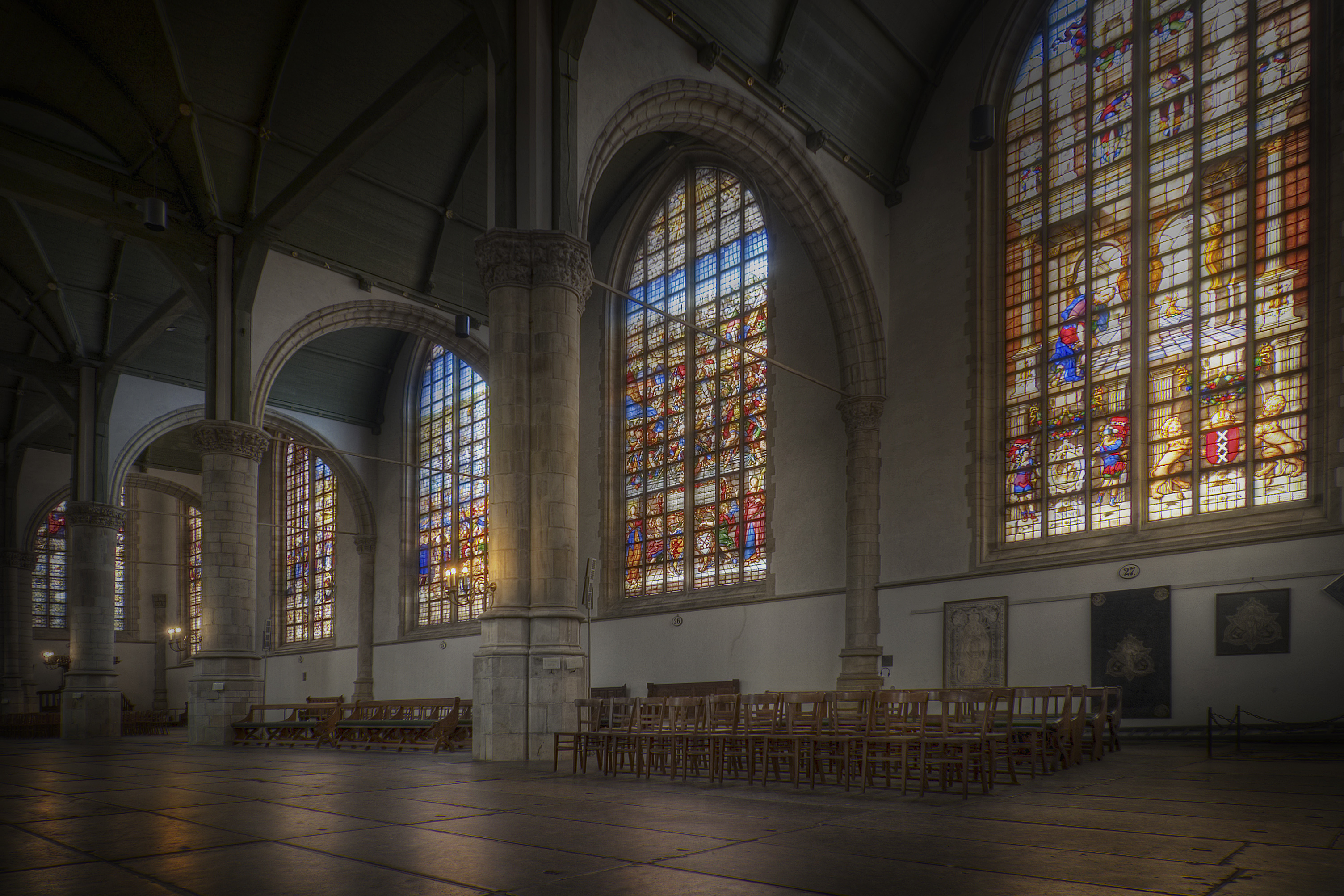
Sint Janskerk in Gouda, South Holland, Netherlands

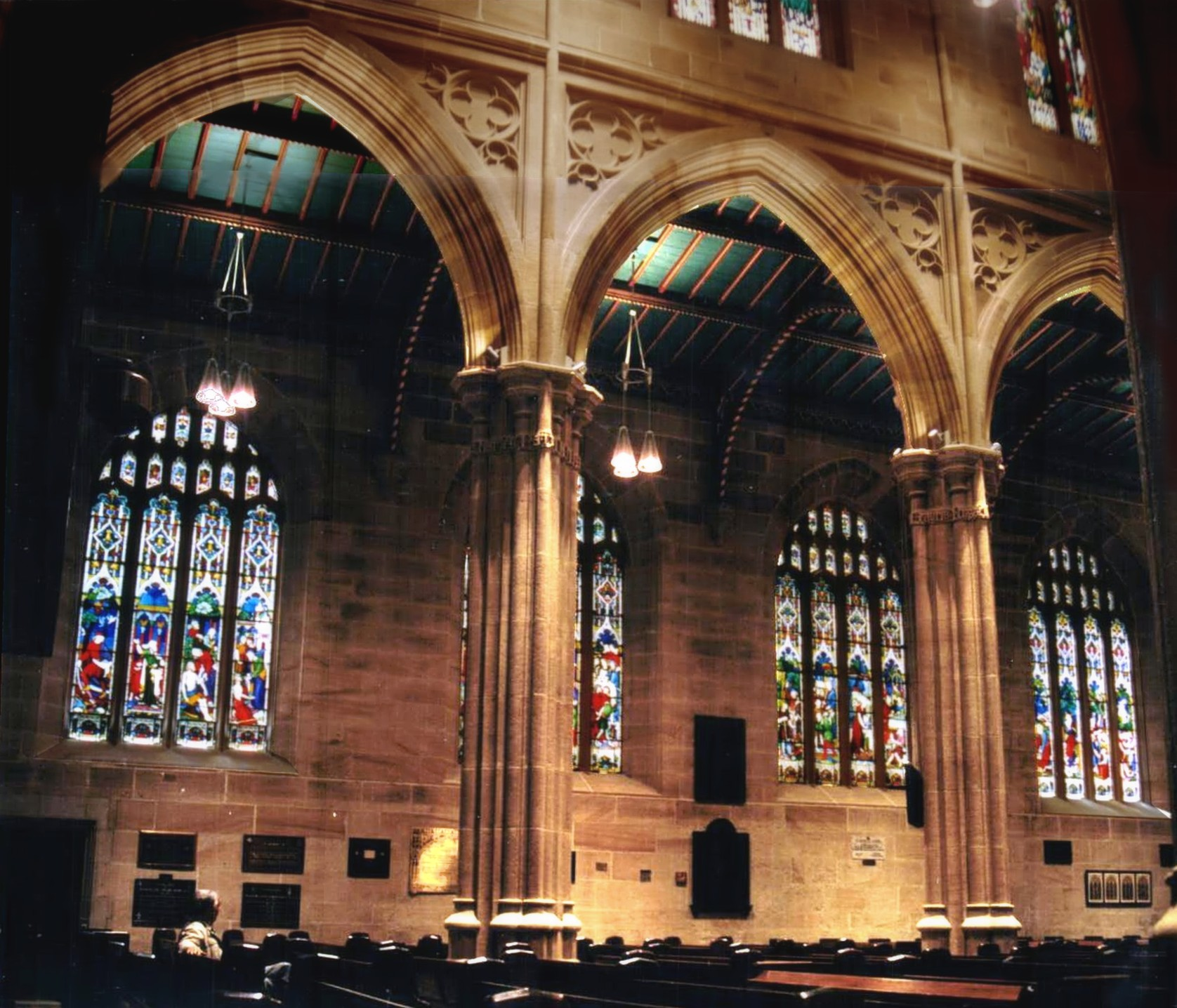
St. Andrew's Cathedral, Sydney has a cycle of 19th-century windows by Hardman of Birmingham.

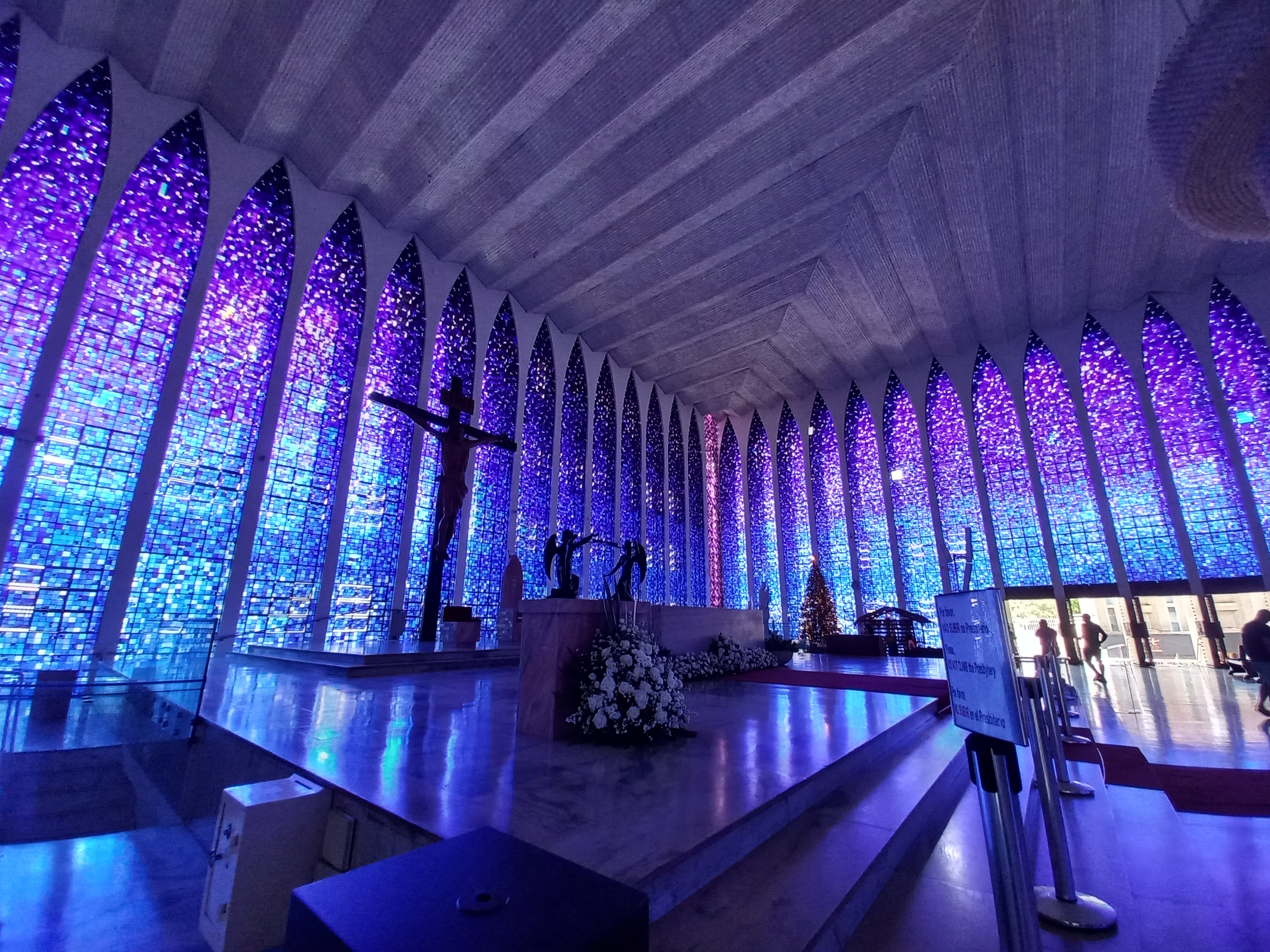
Stained glass windows with 12 tonalities of blue, in the Santuário Dom Bosco (John Bosco), a modernist catholic church in Brasília

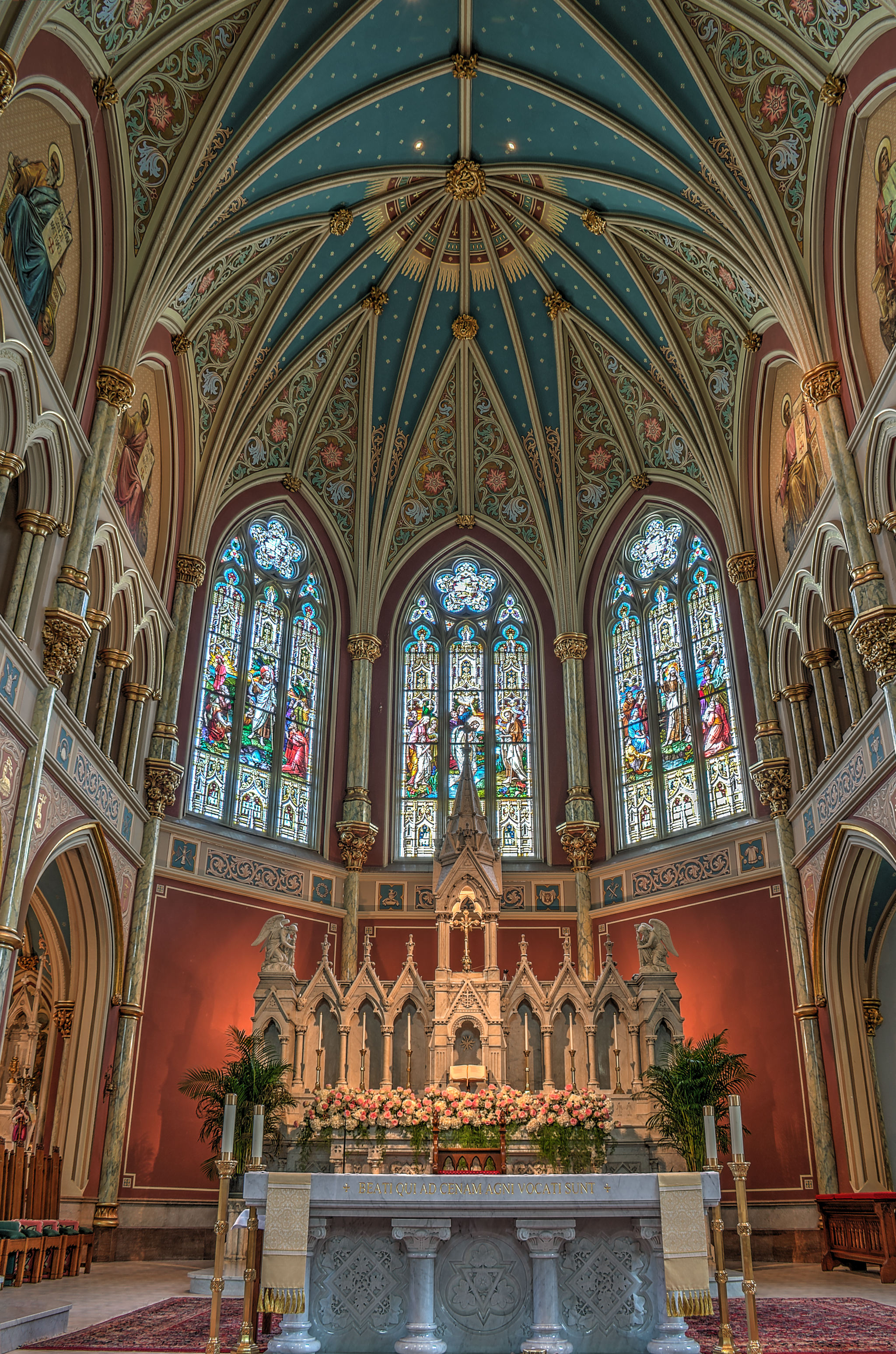
Cathedral of St. John the Baptist in Savannah, Georgia

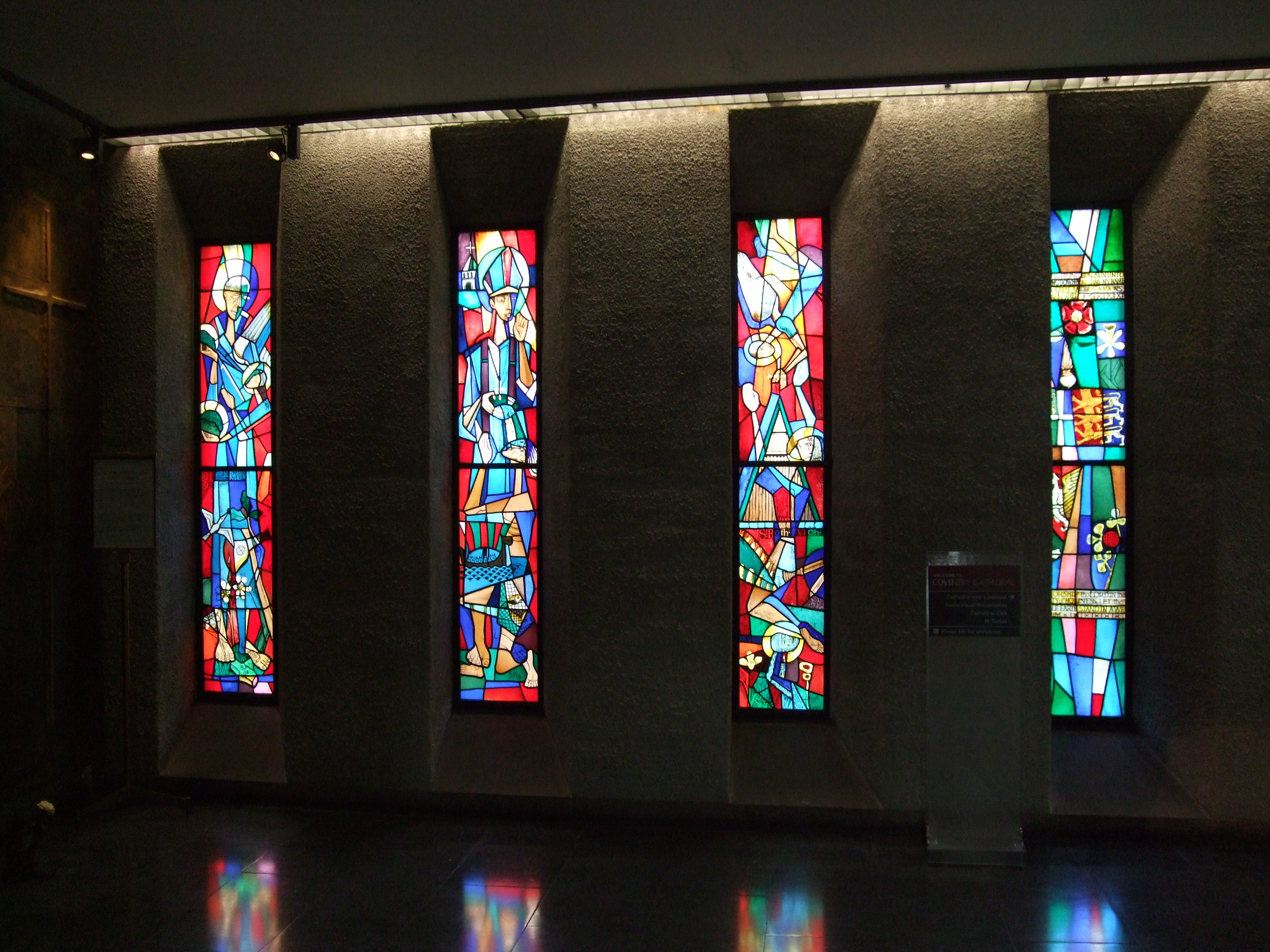
Coventry Cathedral England, has a series of windows by different designers (depicted: The Swedish Windows by Einar Forseth, 1961)

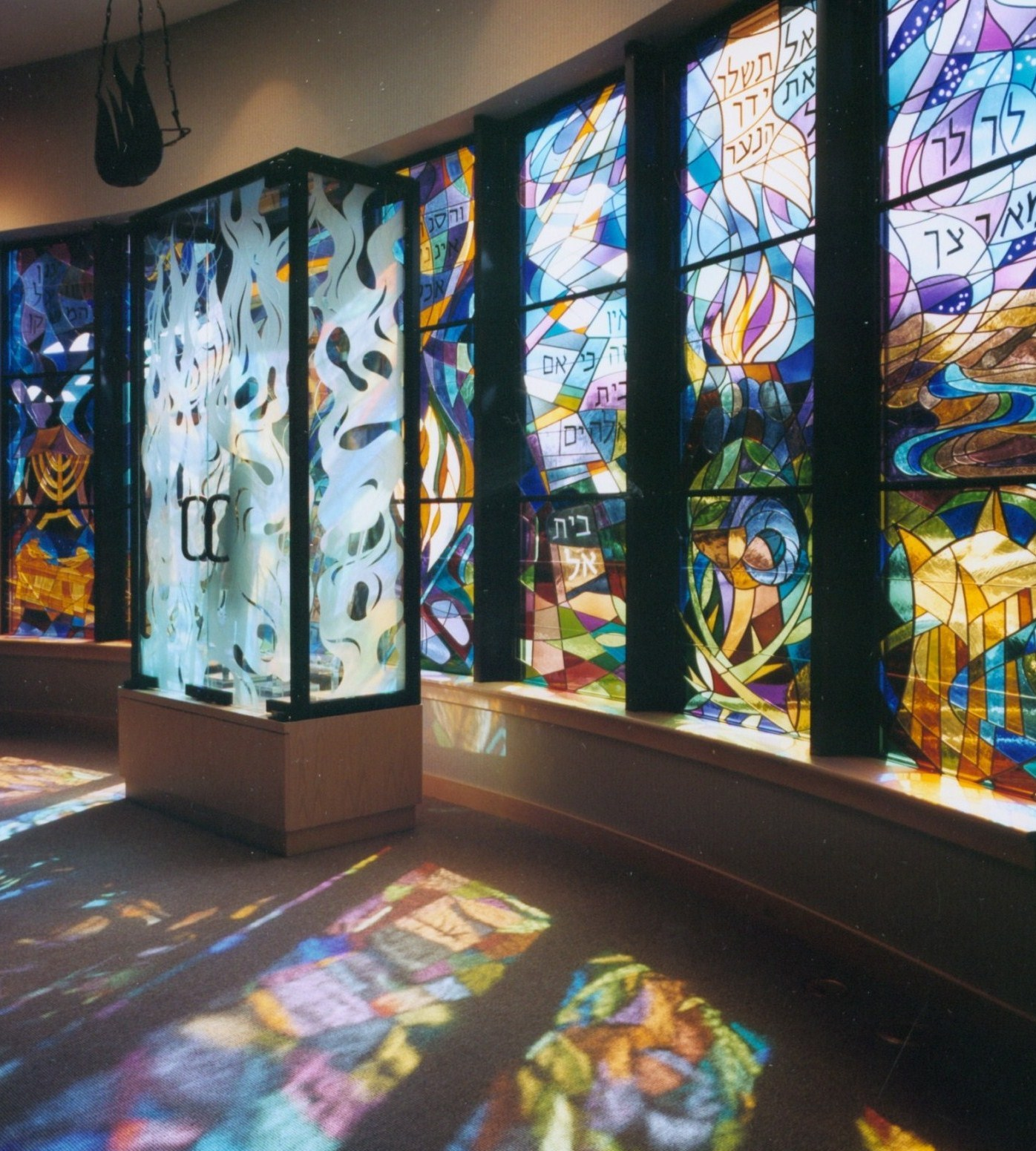
Late 20th-century stained glass from Temple Ohev Sholom, Harrisburg, Pennsylvania by Ascalon Studios

=== Mausolea ===
Mausolea, whether for general community use or for private family use, may employ stained glass as a comforting entry for natural light, for memorialization, or for display of religious imagery.

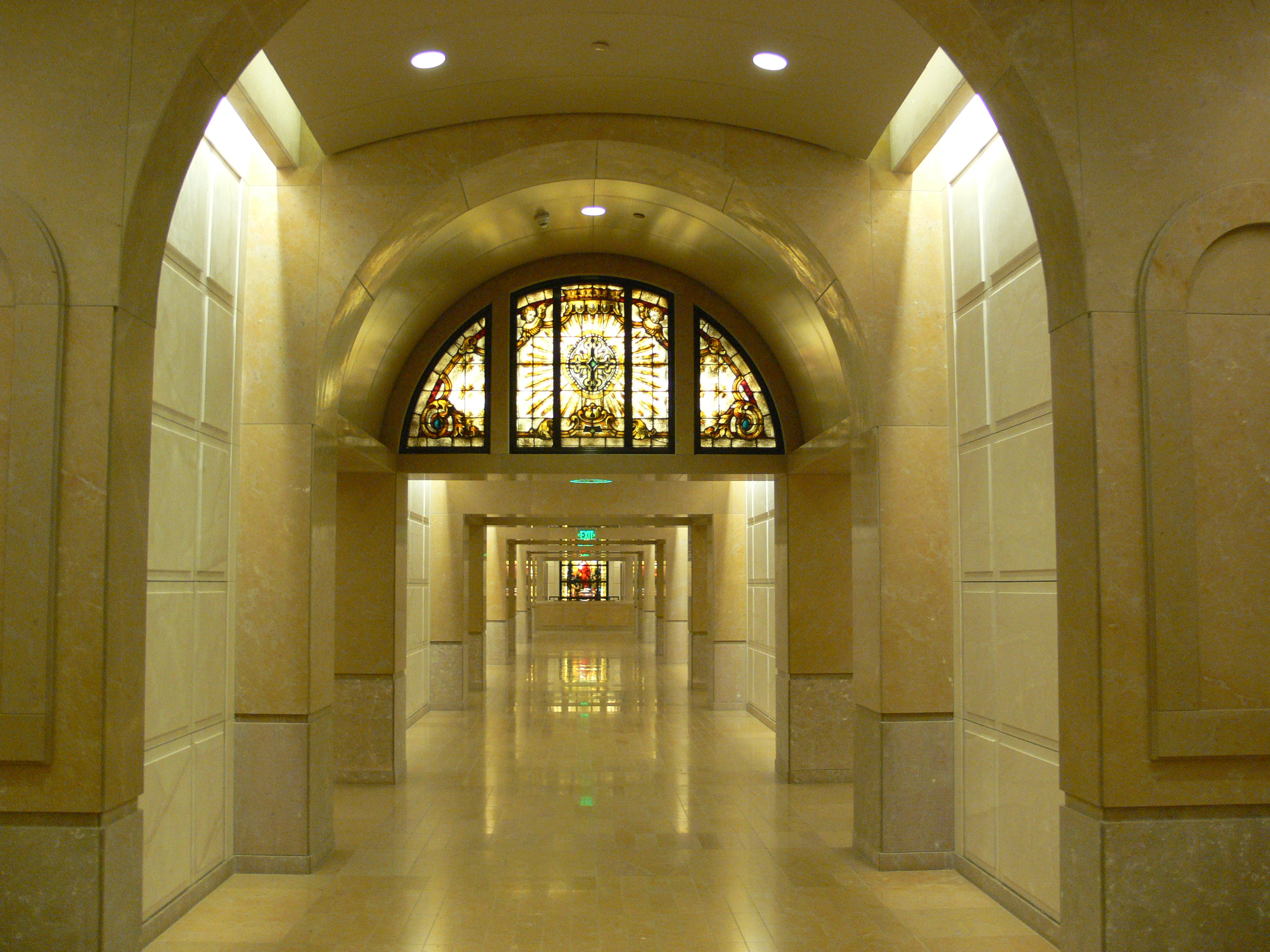
Stained glass in the crypt mausoleum of the Cathedral of Our Lady of the Angels, Los Angeles, California

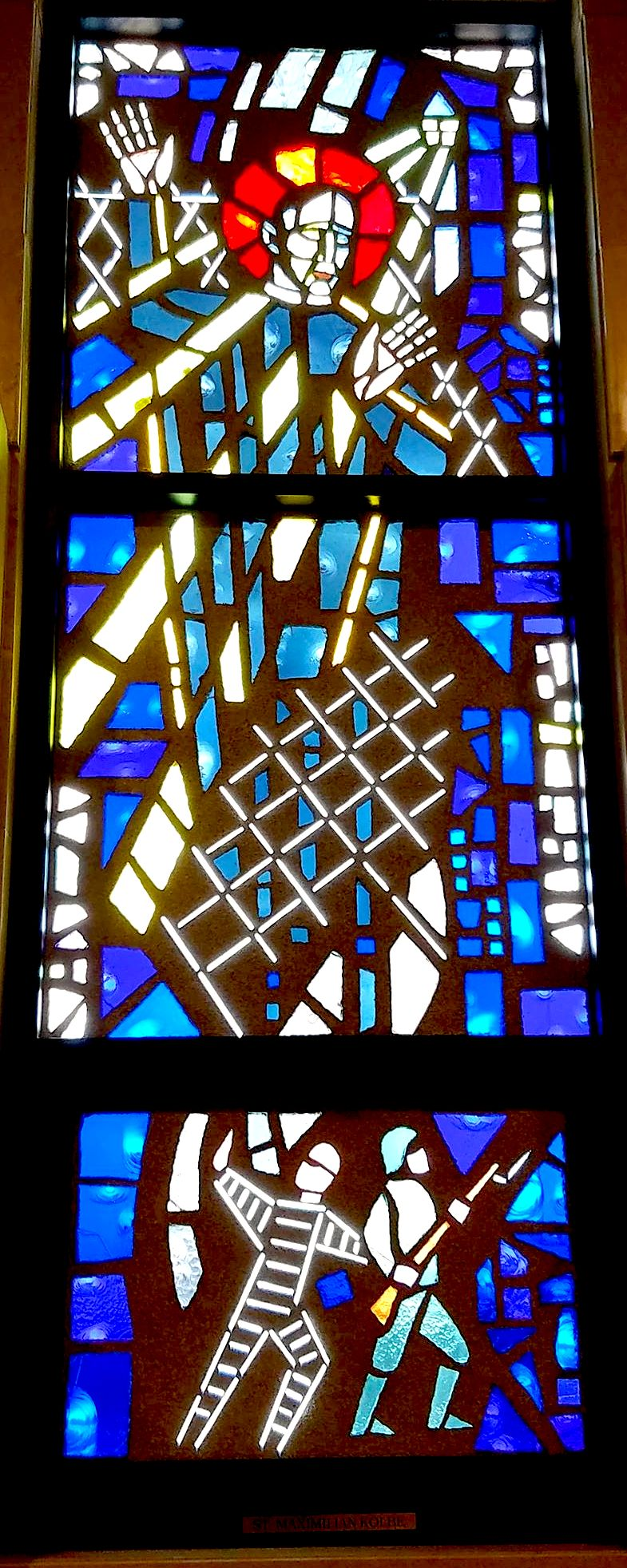
Commemoration of War Dead, Community Mausoleum of All Saints Cemetery, Des Plaines, Illinois

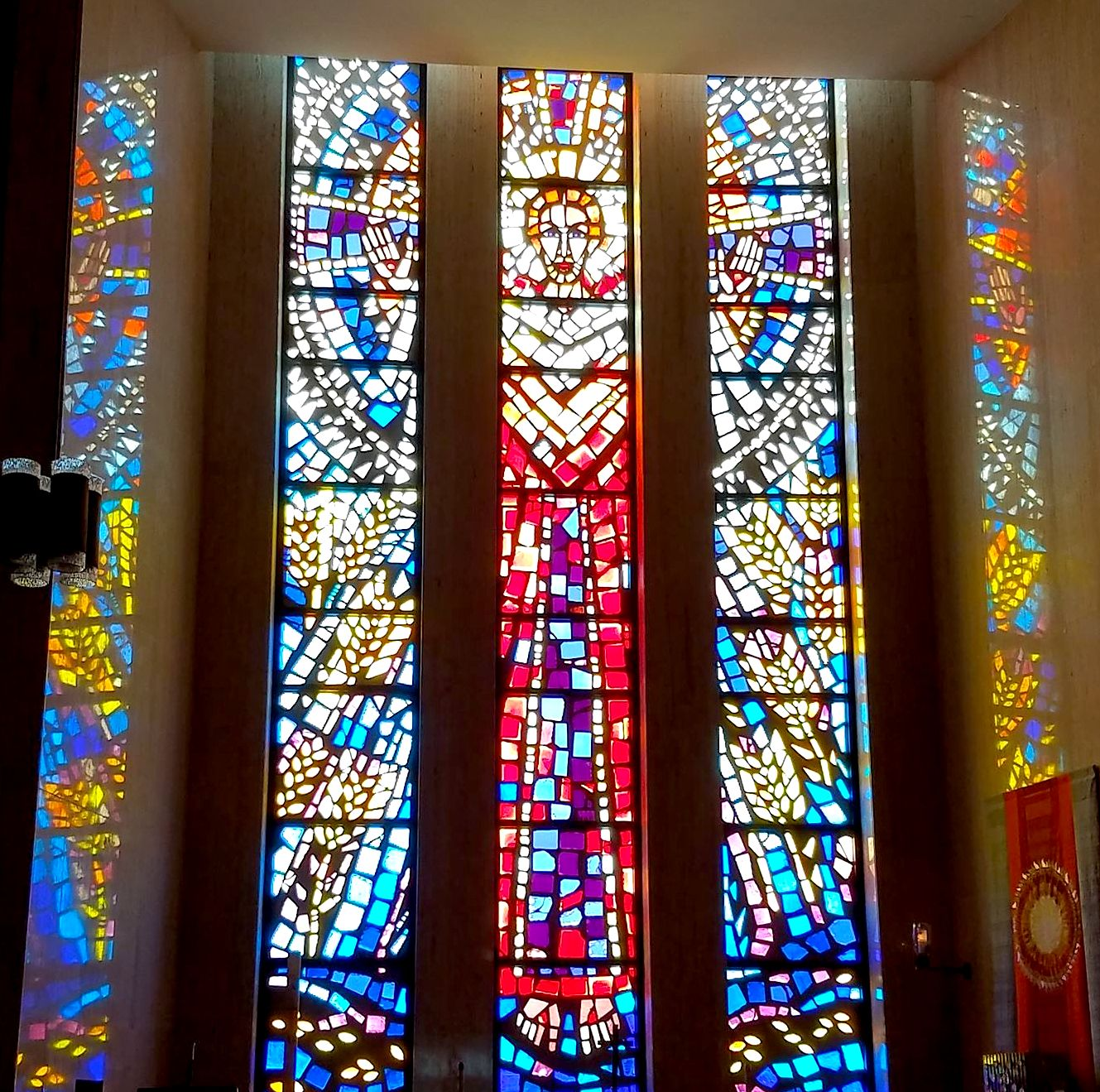
Chapel stained glass showing the Resurrection of Jesus, All Saints Cemetery Community Mausoleum, Des Plaines, Illinois

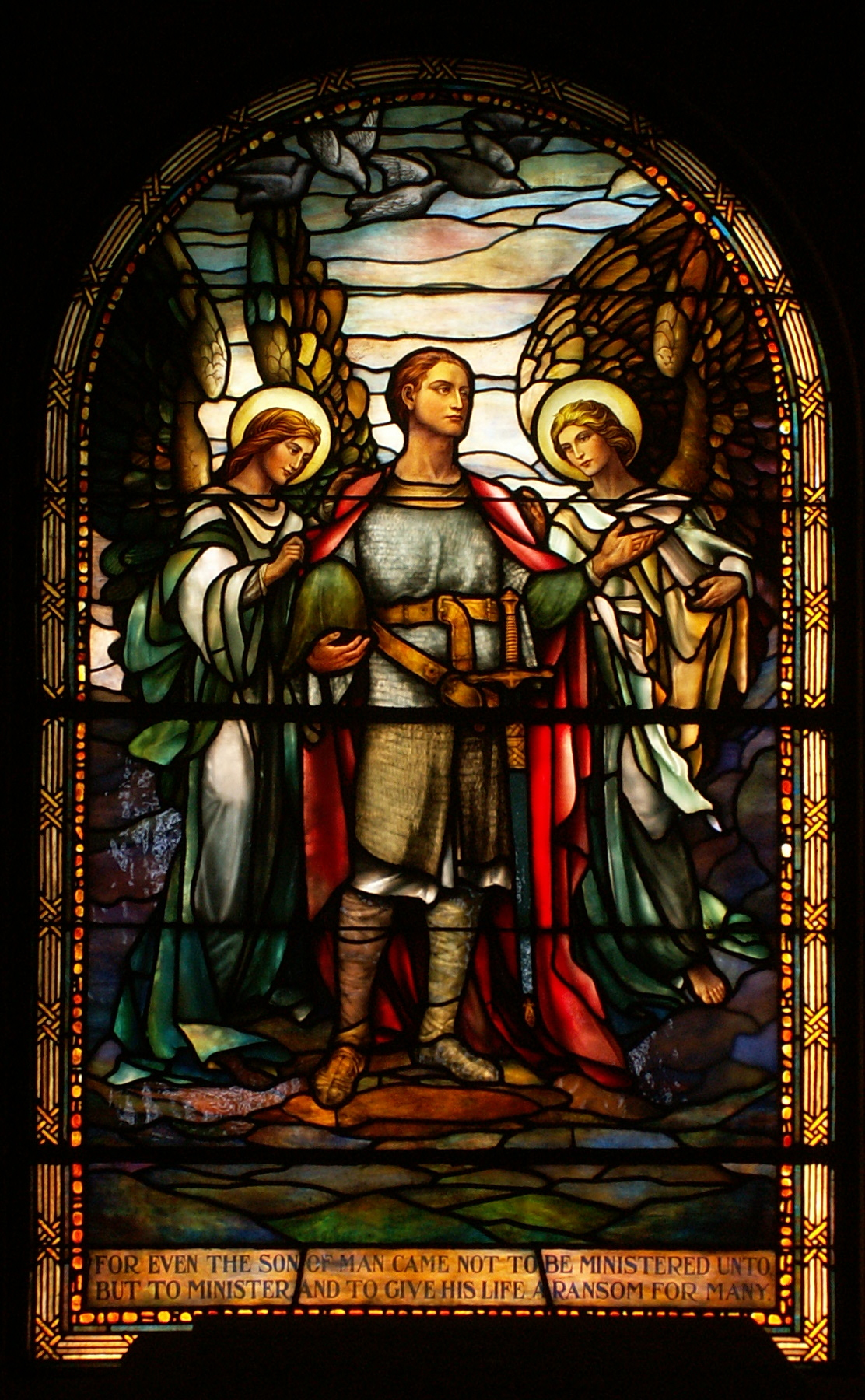
Stained-glass window in the Benedum mausoleum, Homewood Cemetery, Pittsburgh, Pennsylvania

=== Houses ===
Stained glass windows in houses were particularly popular in the Victorian era and many domestic examples survive from this time. In their simplest form they typically depict birds and flowers in small panels, often surrounded with machine-made cathedral glass which, despite what the name suggests, is pale-coloured and textured. Many houses of the 19th and early 20th centuries feature original leadlight windows, another popular form of window glass in domestic settings. Prairie School architecture, of which the houses of Frank Lloyd Wright are the most famous examples, uses stained glass to depict natural motifs inspired by American prairie landscapes.

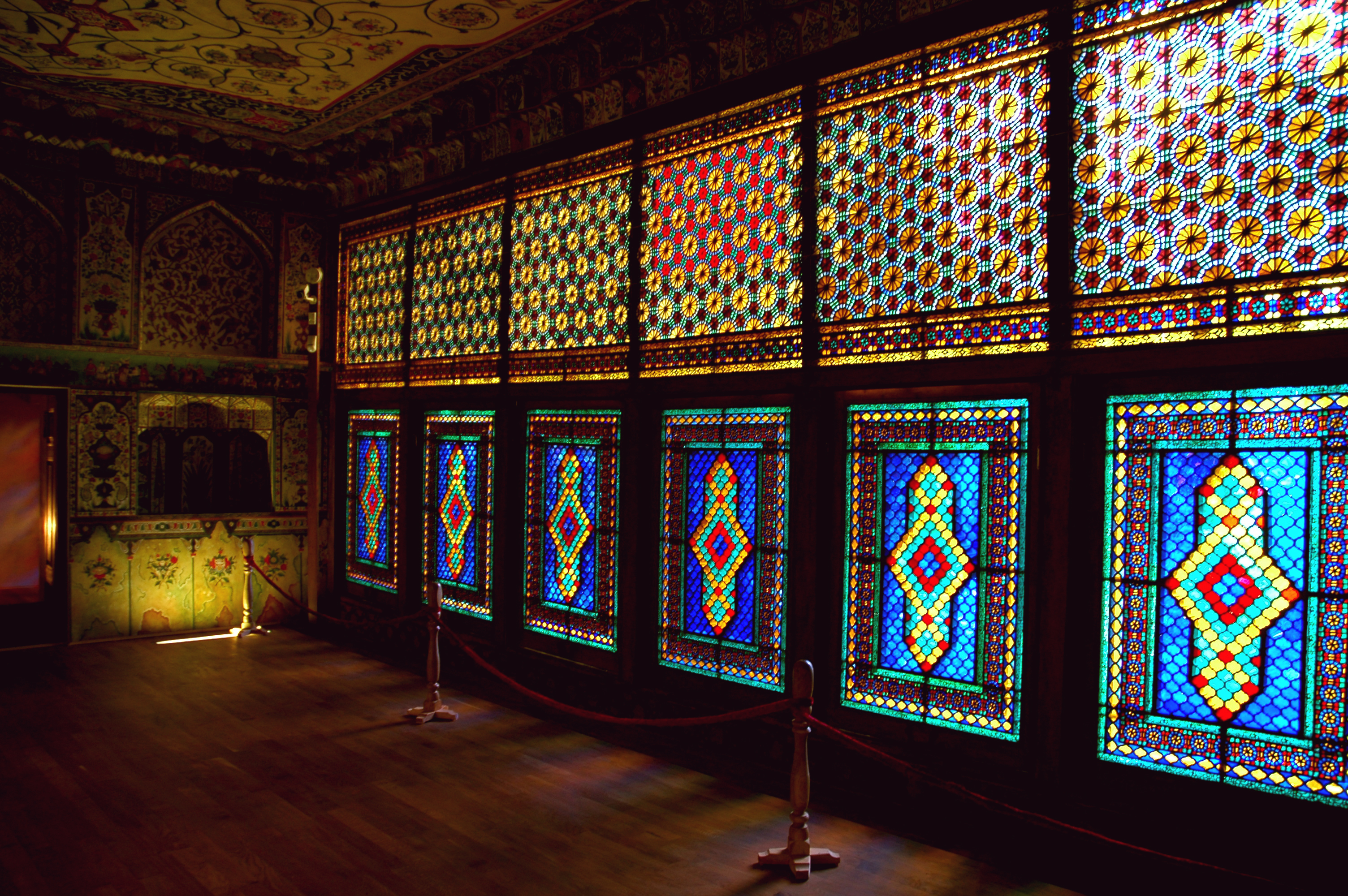
Shabaka (stained glass set into a wooden lattice) at the Palace of Shaki Khans (18th century CE)

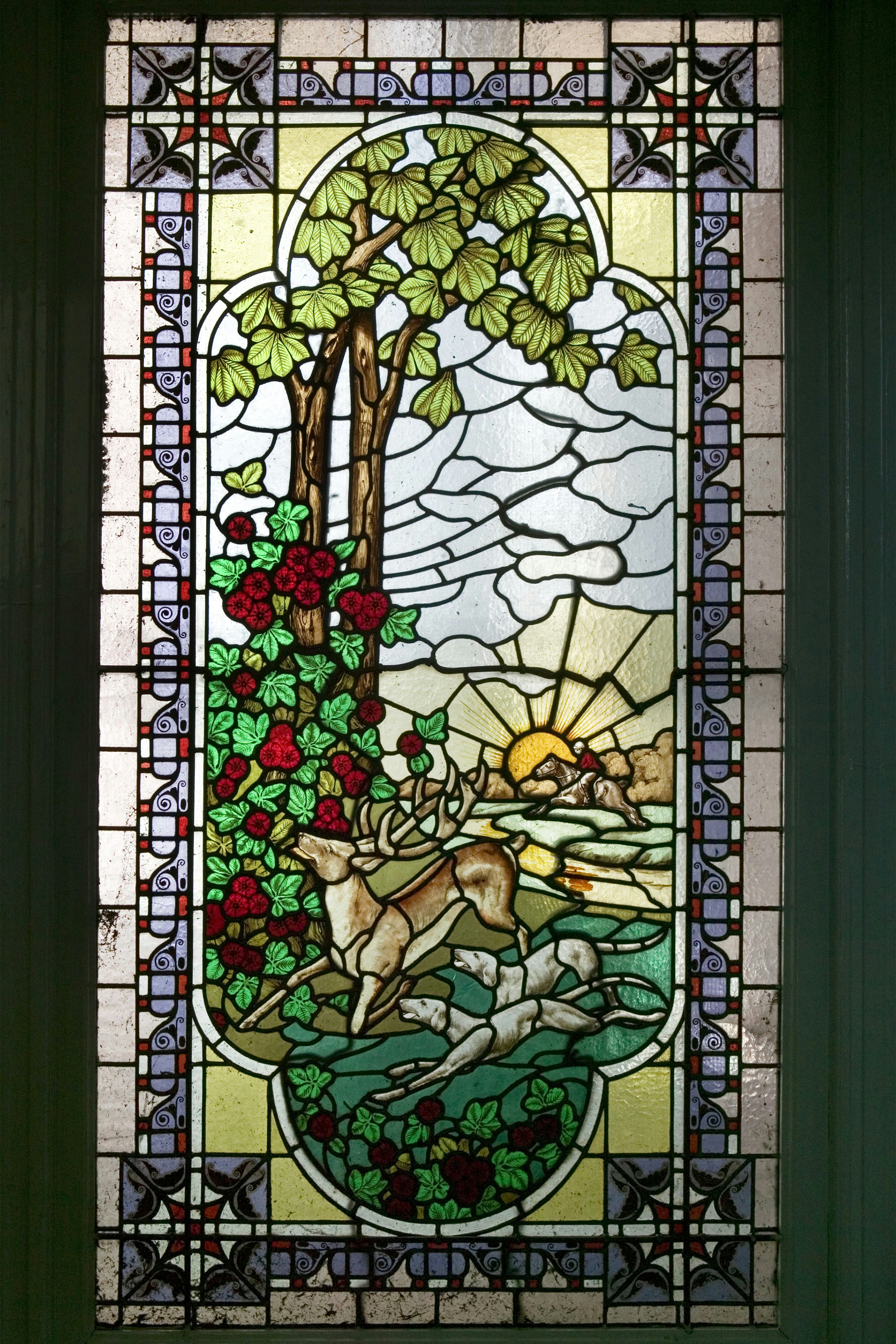
Domestic stained glass of a hunting scene by Willem Bogtman of Haarlem (1882–1955), Netherlands

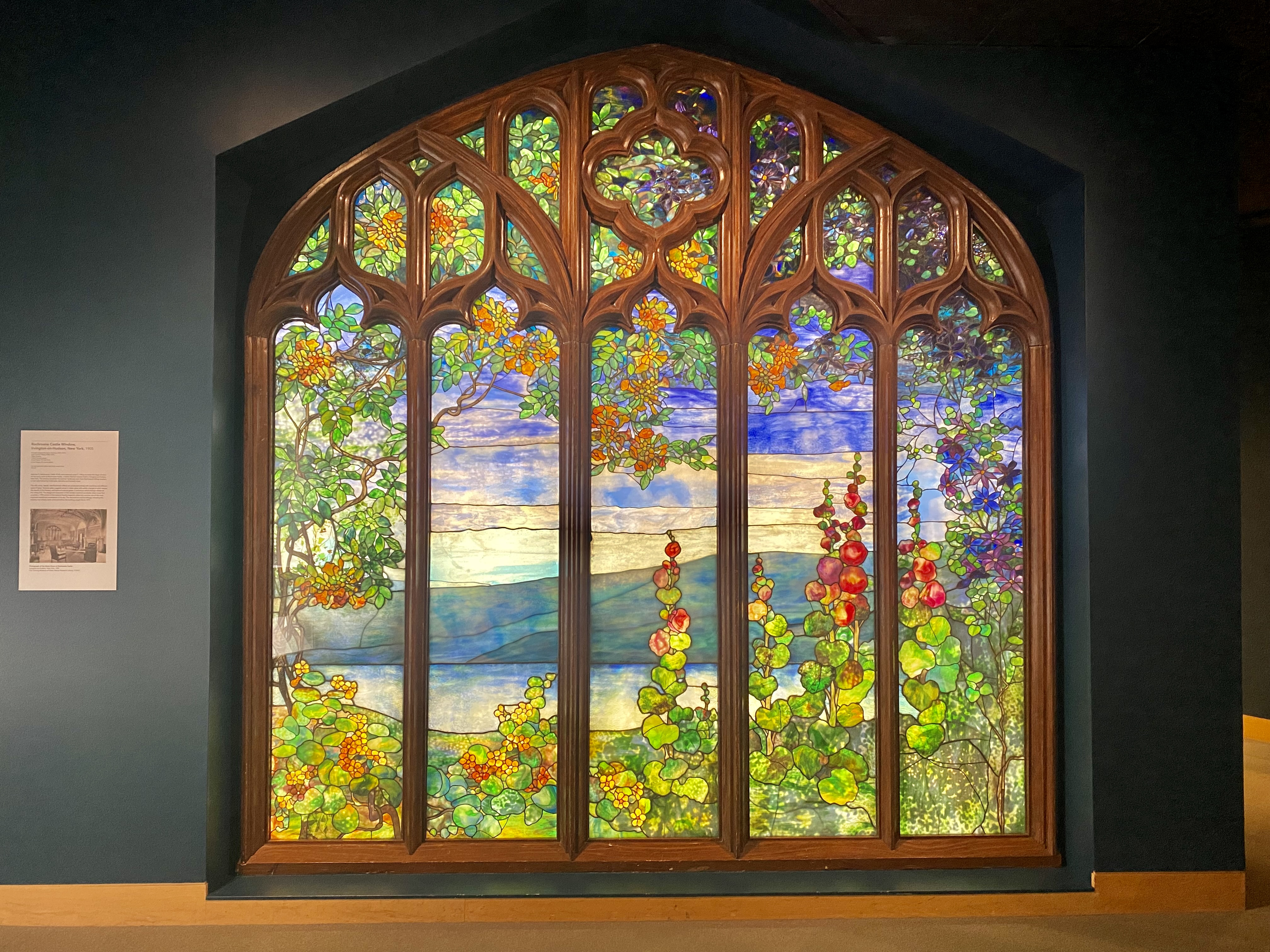
Tiffany glass window from Rochroane Castle (1905), now in the Corning Museum of Glass

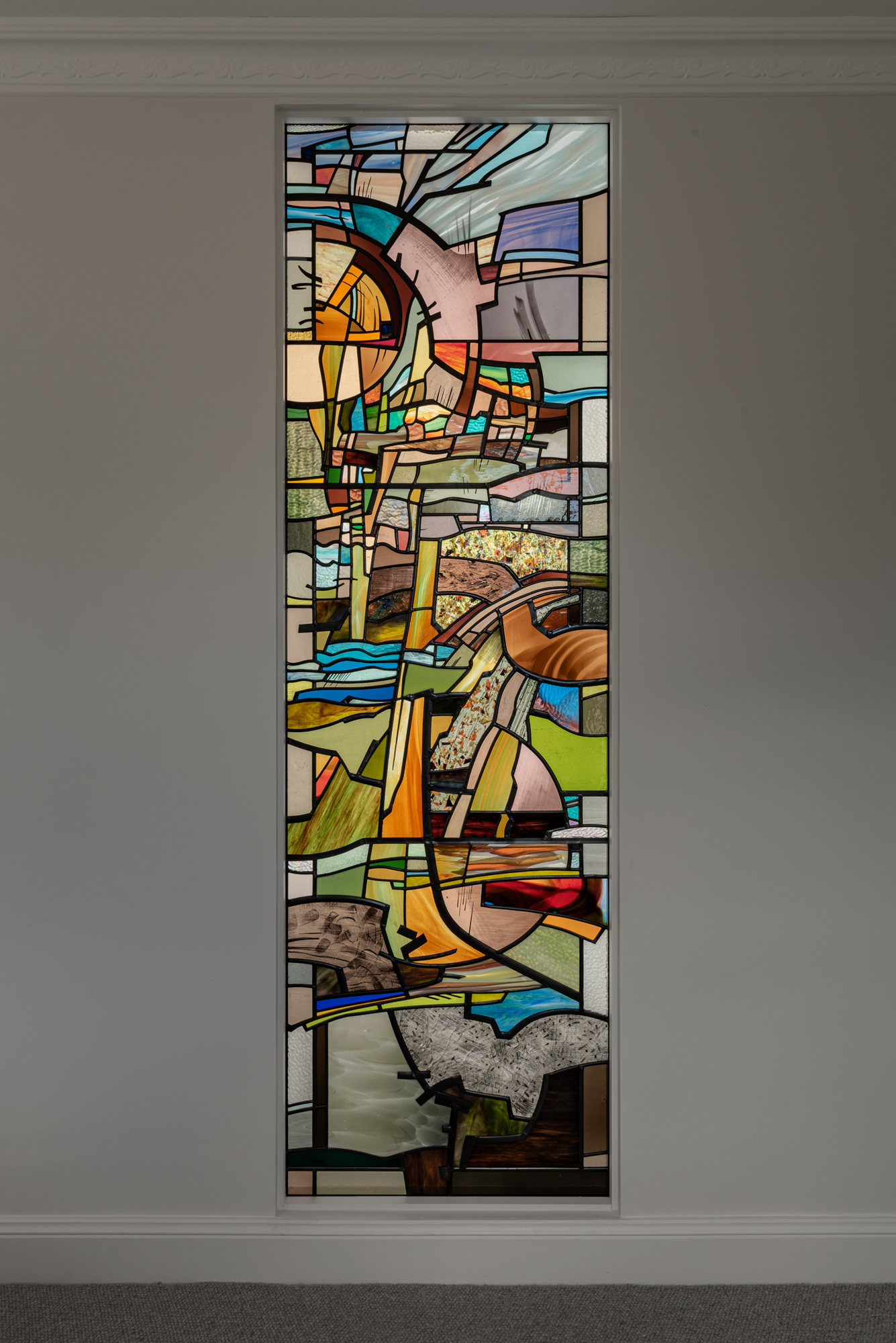
A dividing screen in a household of musicians, by Jeffrey Hamilton (2021), Sydney, Australia (permission of JHamilton)

=== Public and commercial buildings ===
Stained glass has often been used as a decorative element in public buildings, initially in places of learning, government or justice but increasingly in other public and commercial places such as banks, retailers and railway stations. Public houses in some countries make extensive use of stained glass and leaded lights to create a comfortable atmosphere and retain privacy.

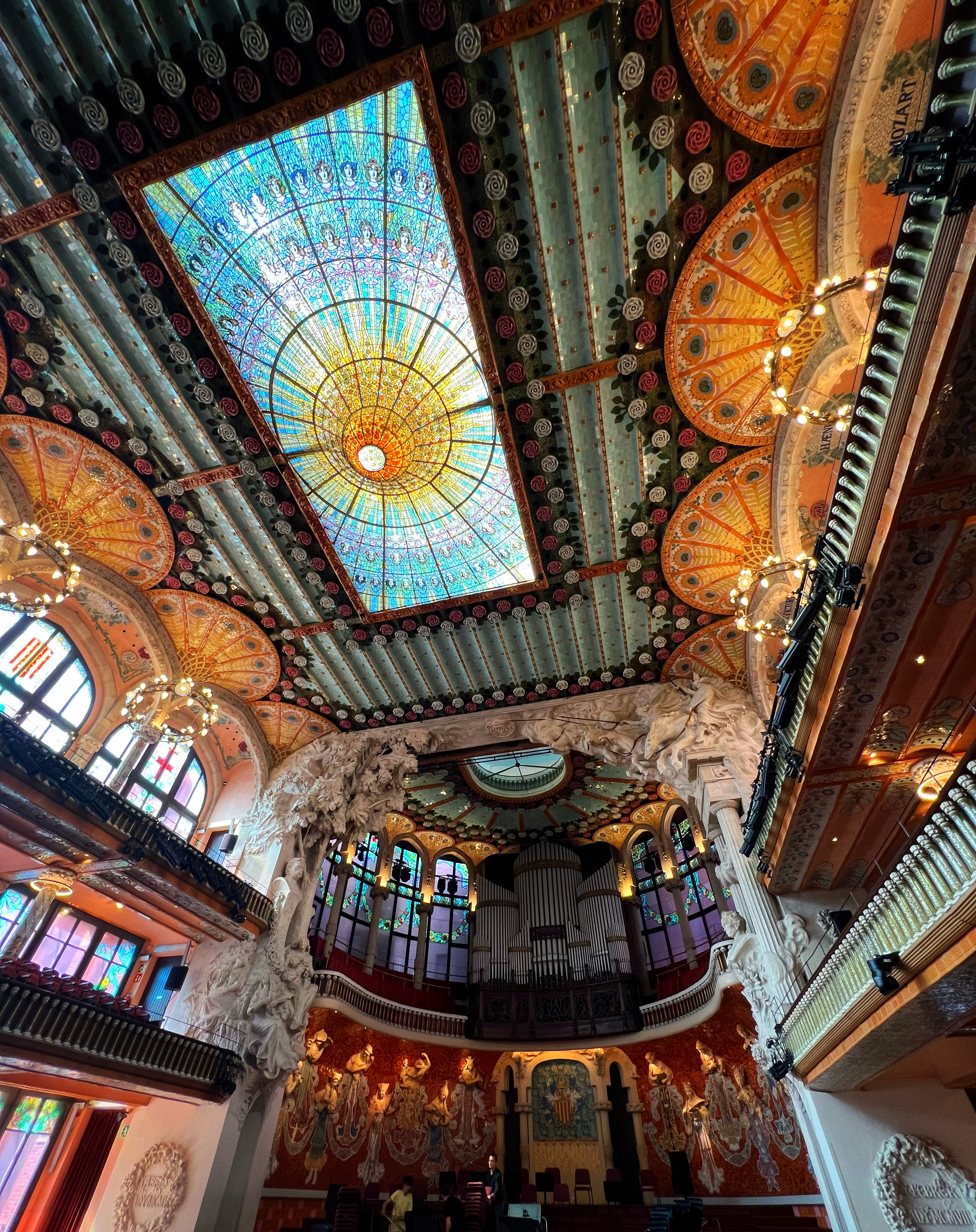
Stained glass skylight at Palau de la Música Catalana in Barcelona, Spain

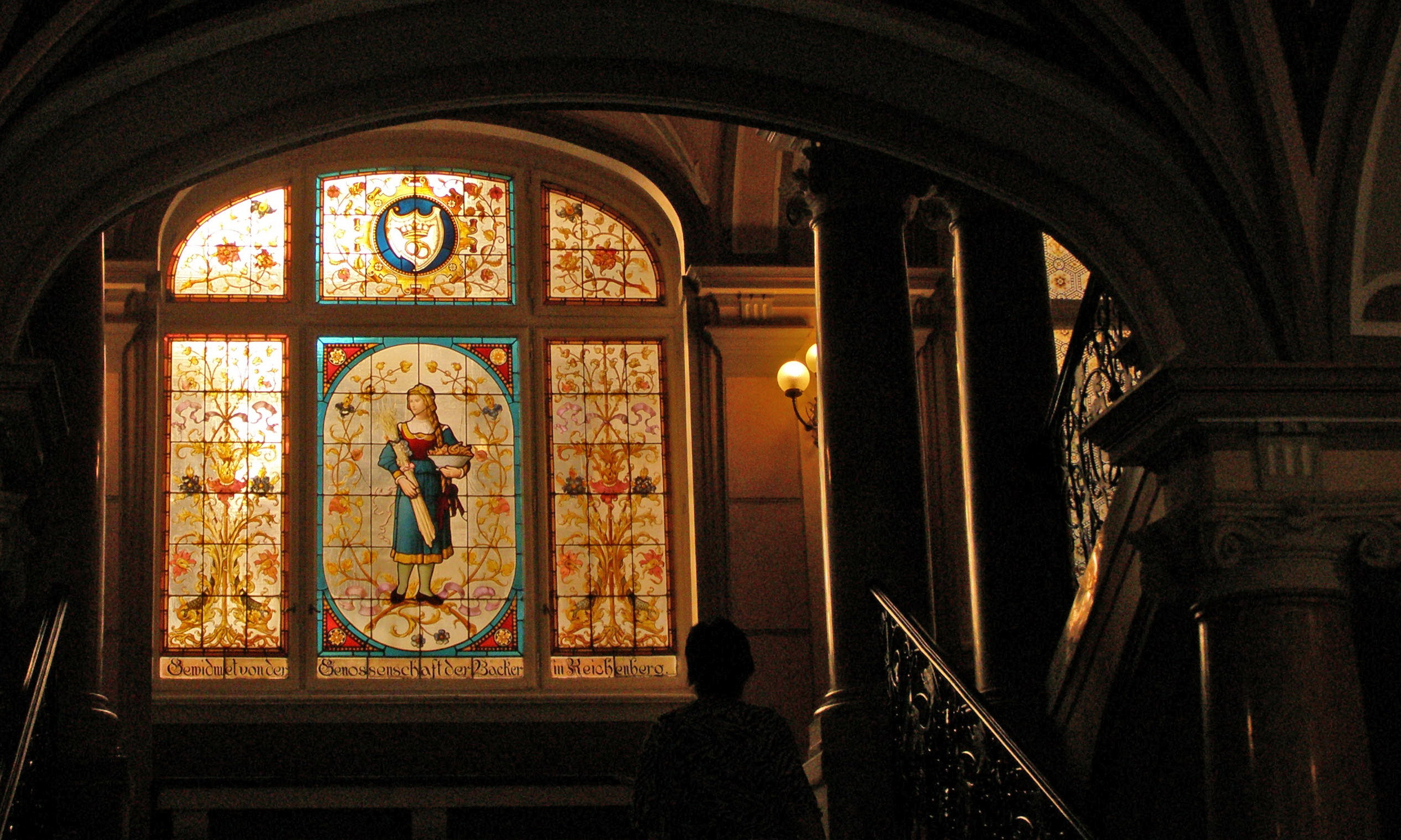
Stained glass in the Town Hall, Liberec, Czech Republic

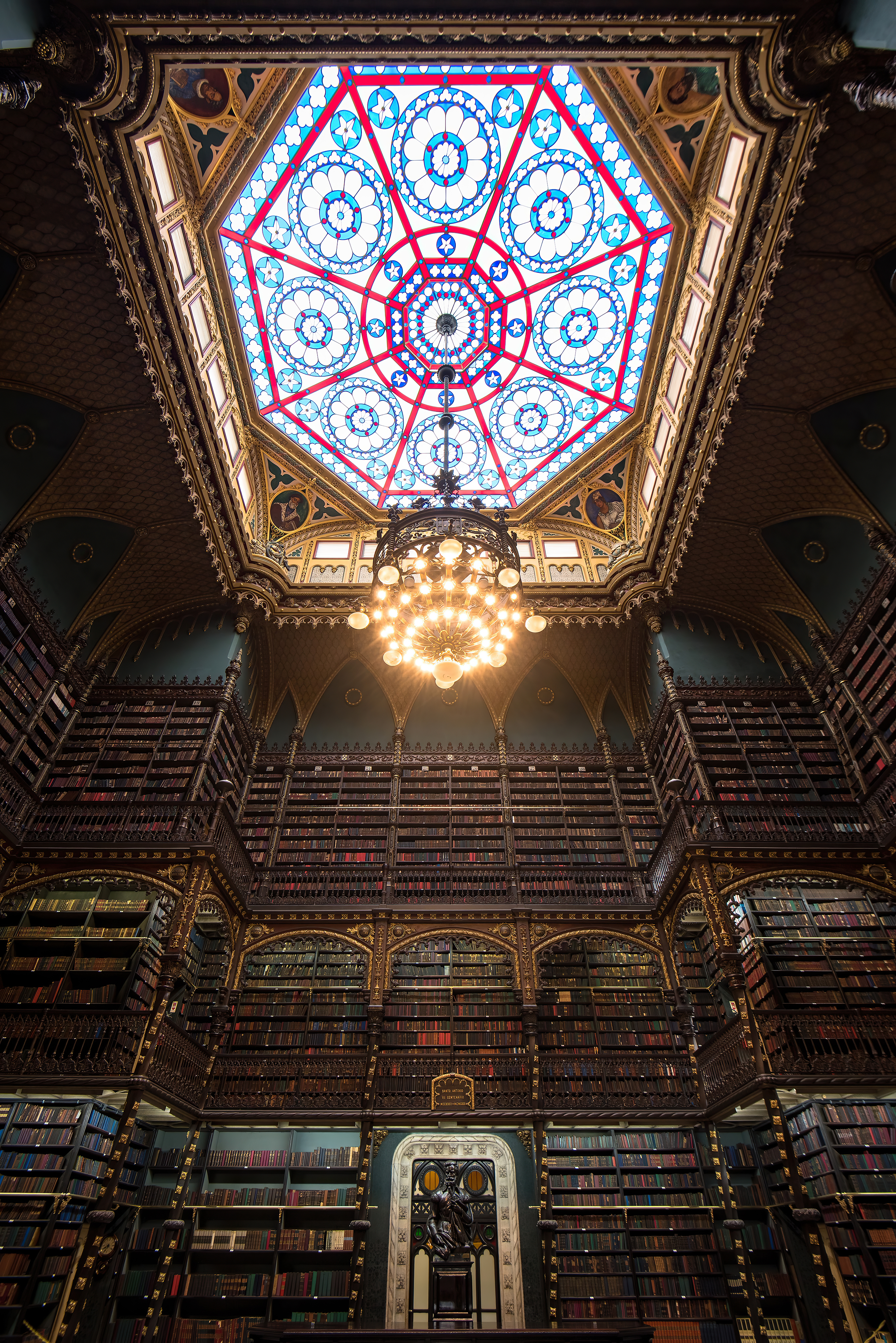
Stained glass dome in the Royal Portuguese Cabinet of Reading in Rio de Janeiro, Brazil

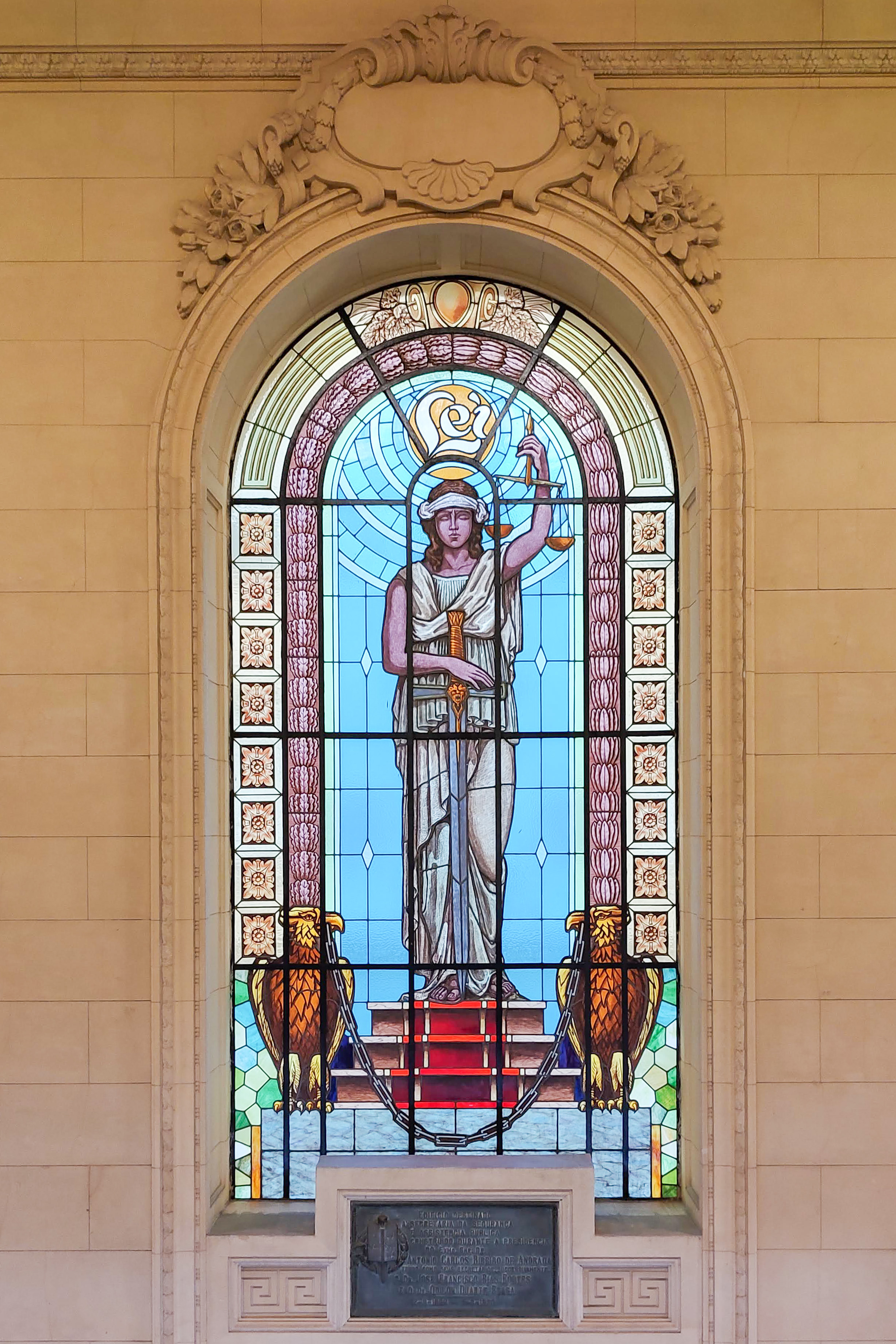
Stained-glass window in the Centro Cultural Banco do Brasil in Belo Horizonte, Brazil

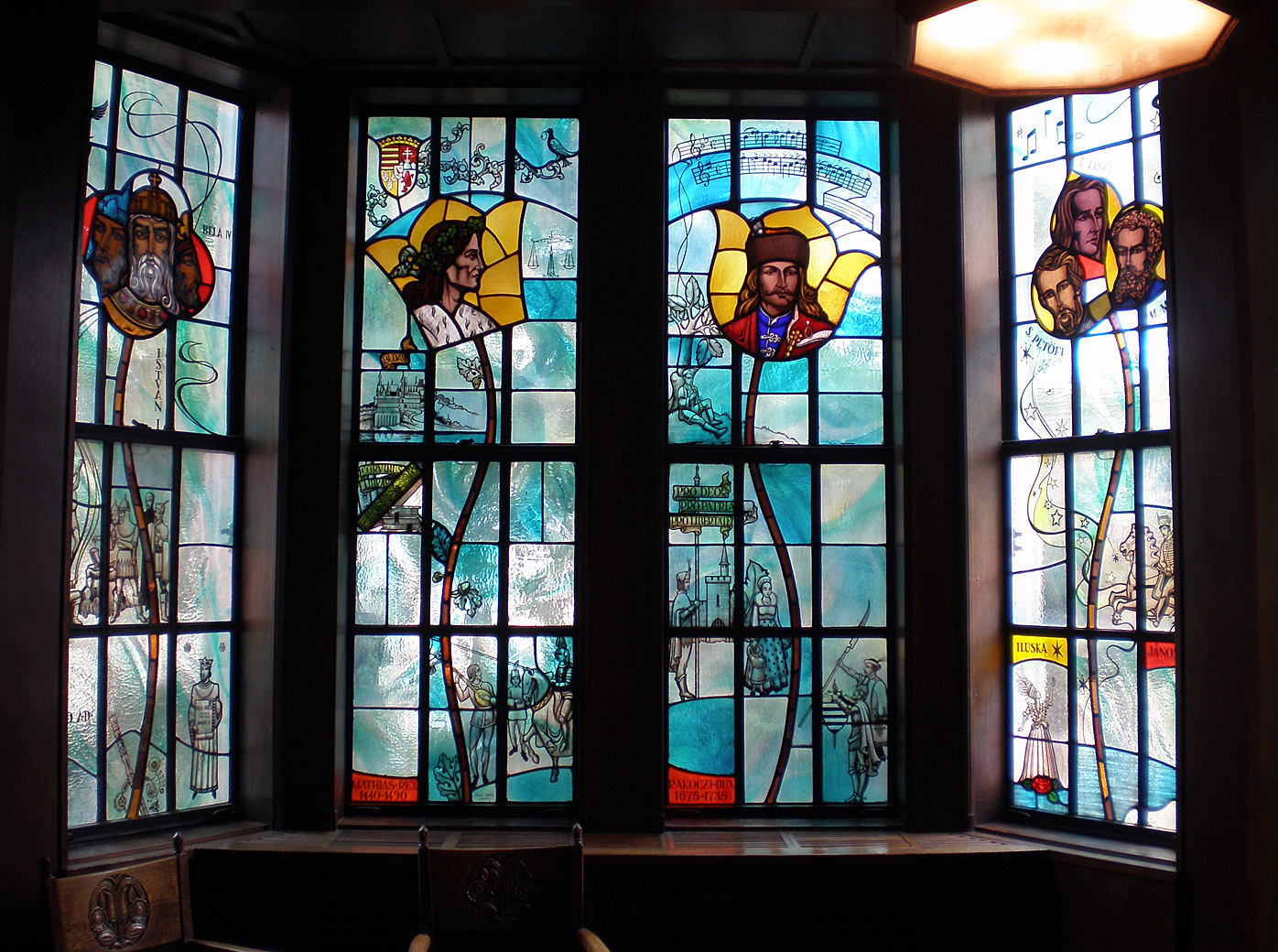
Windows of the Hungarian Room, University of Pittsburgh

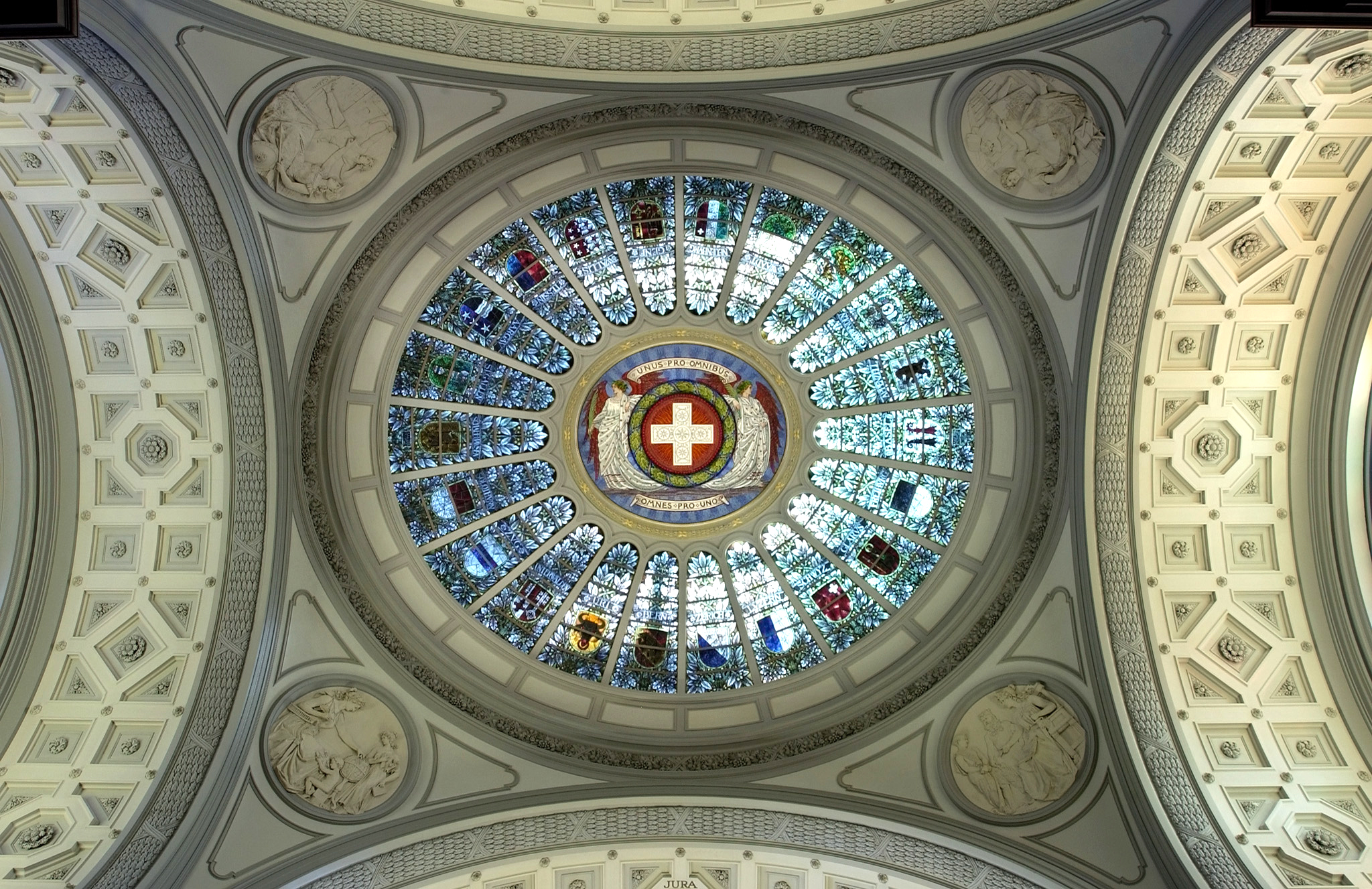
The Federal Palace, Switzerland

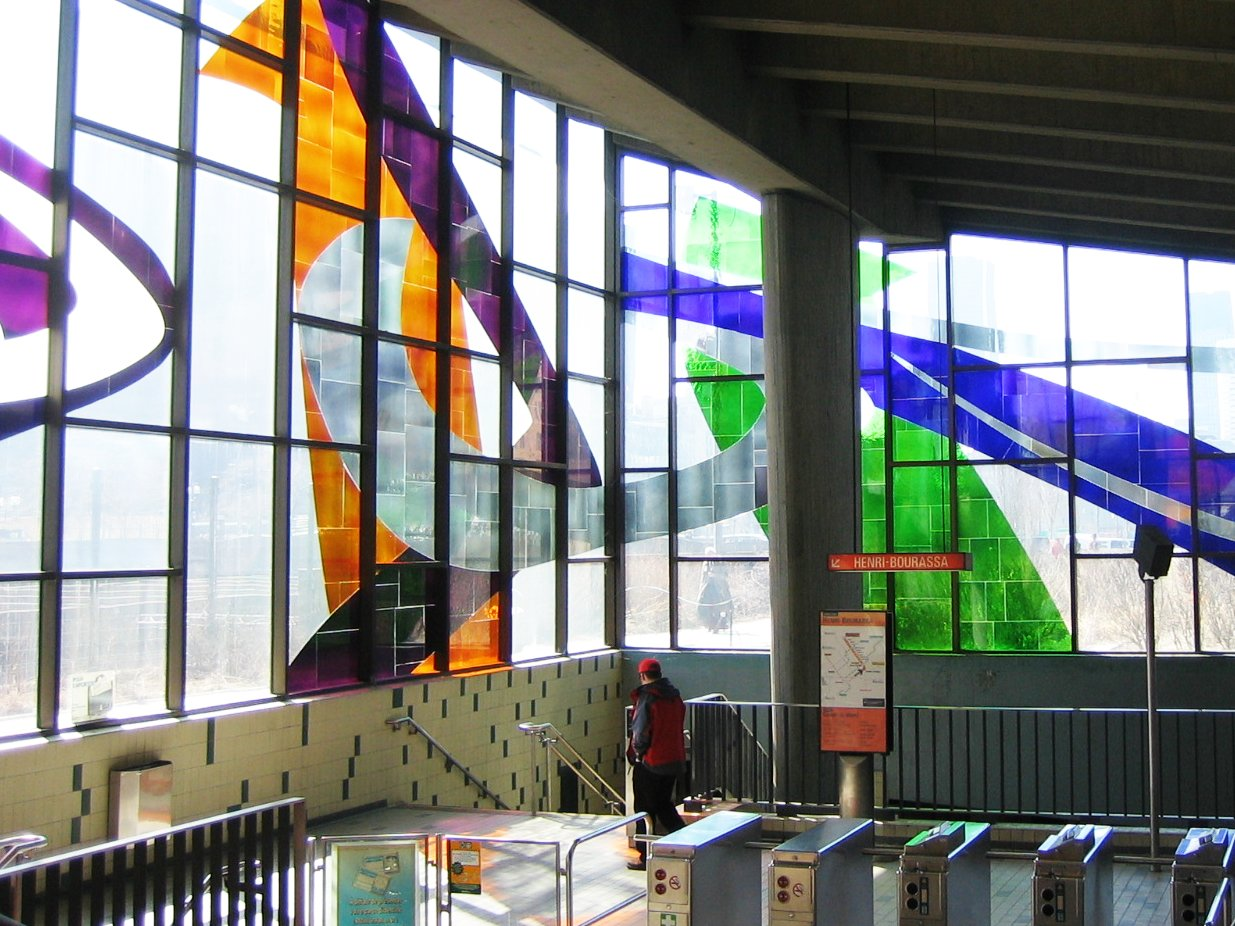
Abstract design by Marcelle Ferron at the Champ-de-Mars Metro station in Montreal, Quebec, Canada

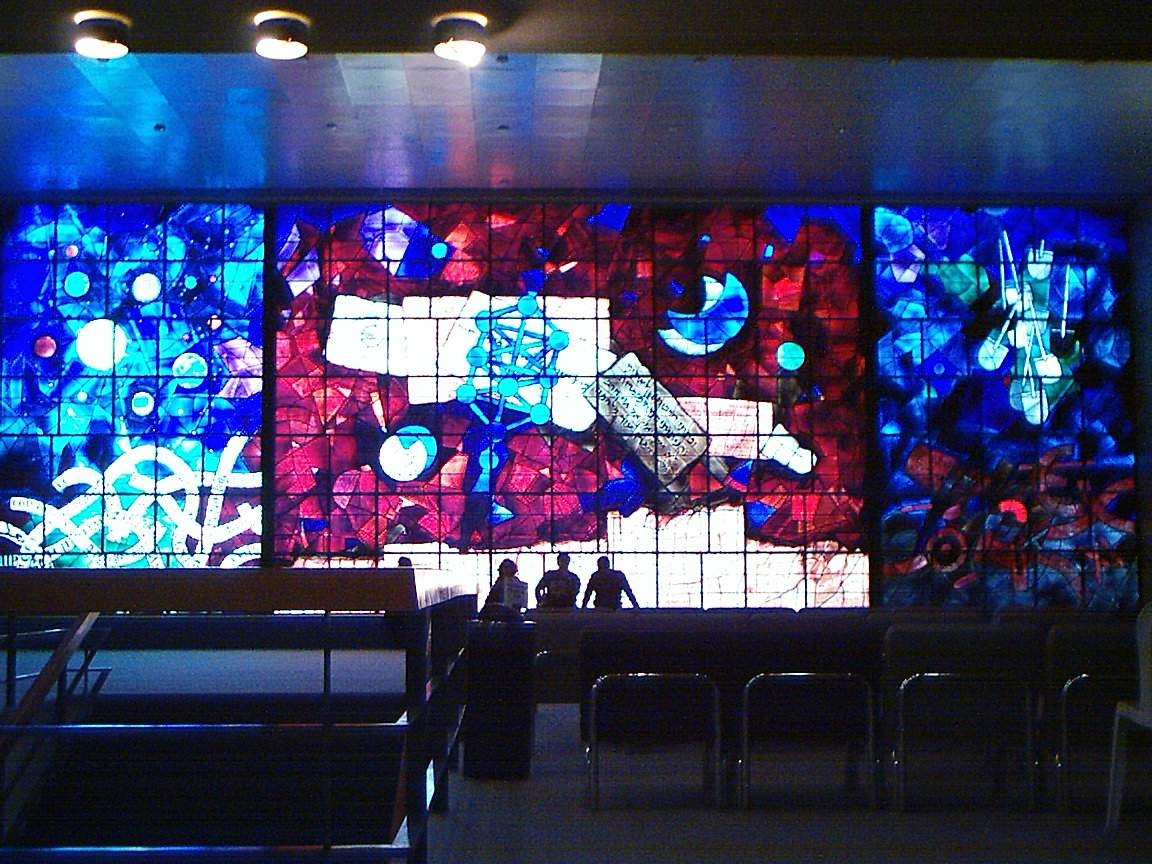
Windows by Mordecai Ardon at the former National Library of Israel building, Givat Ram campus, Jerusalem

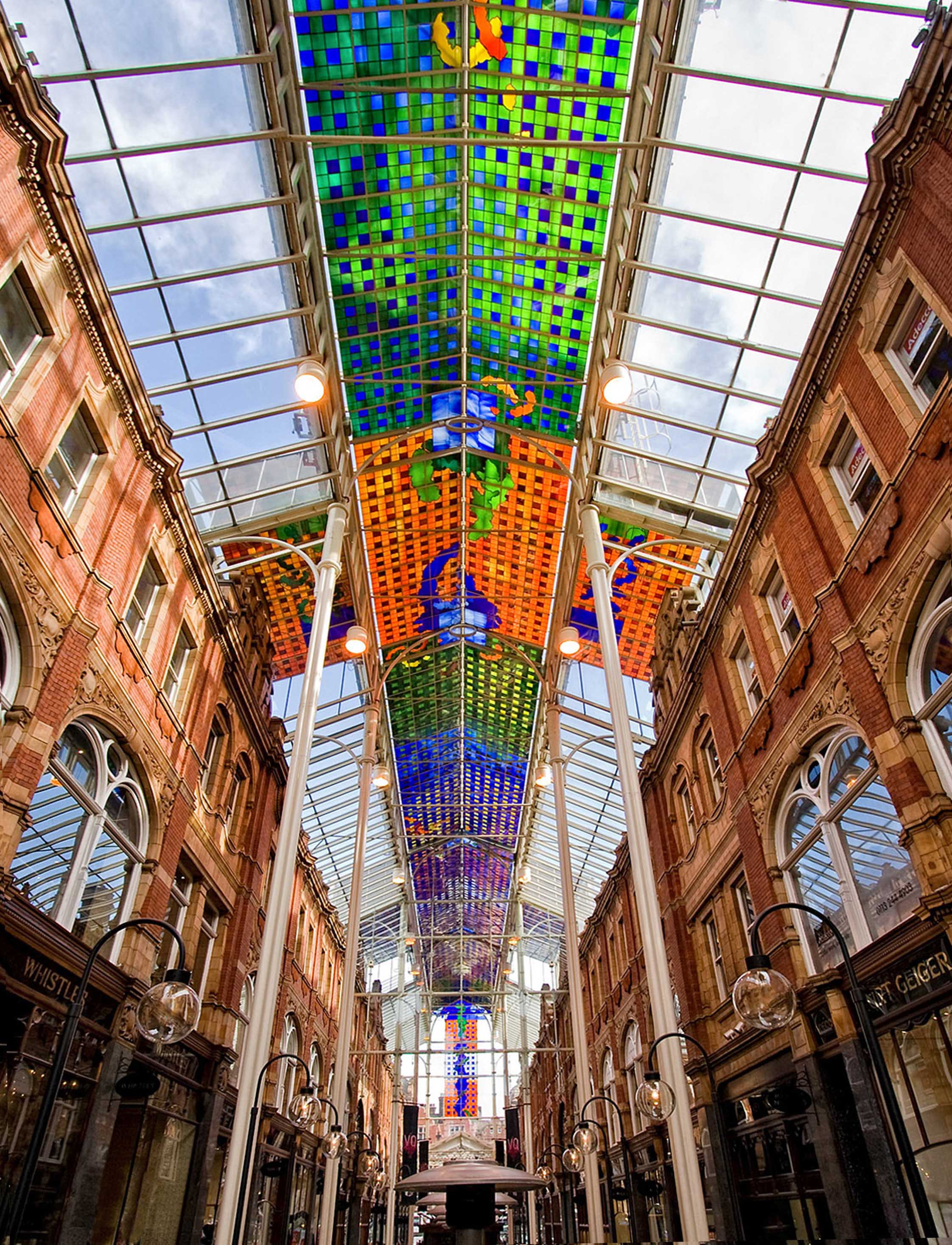
The abstract stained glass ceiling of the Victoria Quarter, Leeds (1990) by Brian Clarke, which spans the 400 foot length of the street to form a covered arcade

=== Sculpture ===
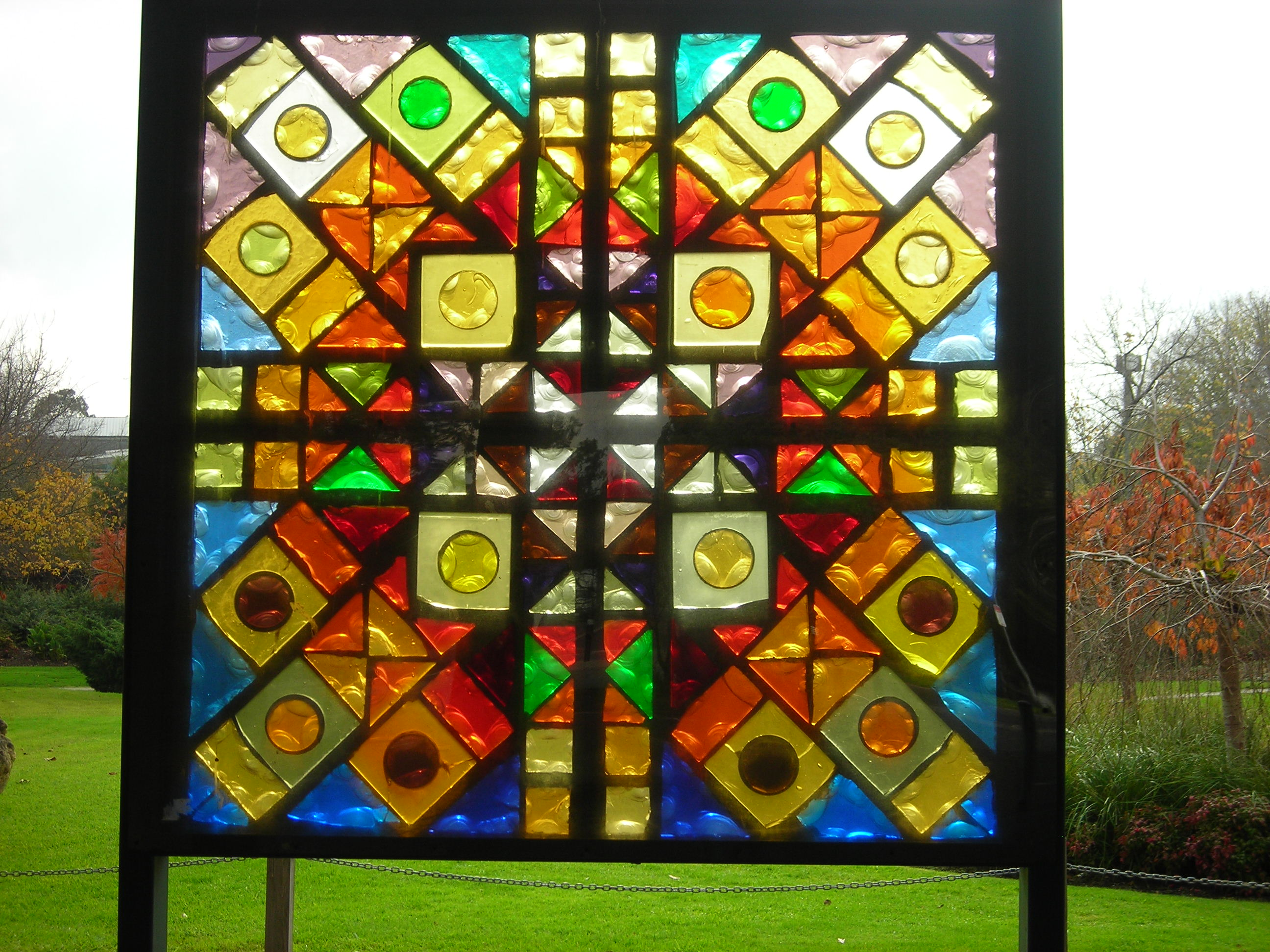
The Four Seasons (1978) by Leonard French at La Trobe University Sculpture Park in Melbourne, Australia

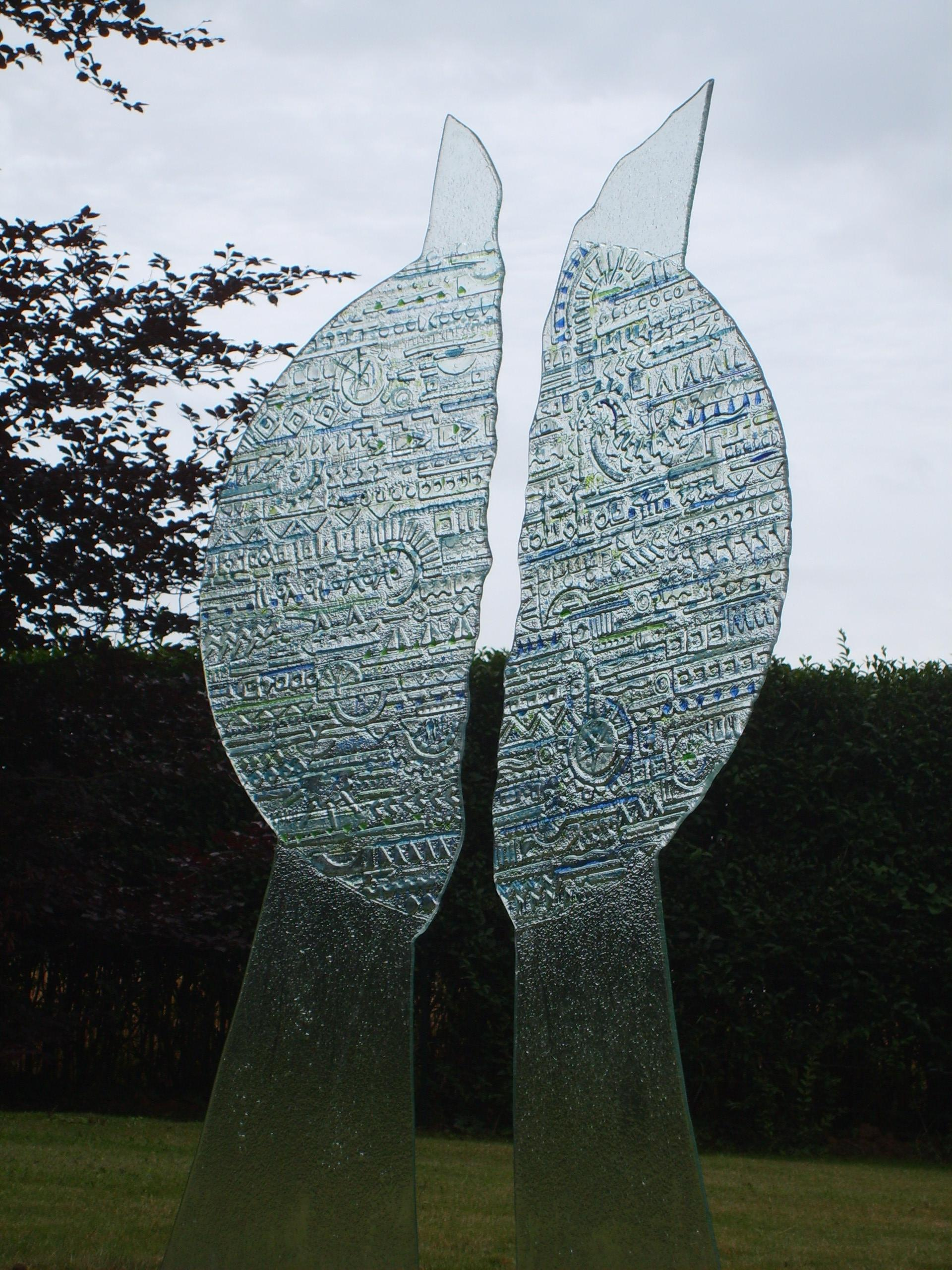
Fused glass sculpture (2012) by Carlo Roccella in Paris, France

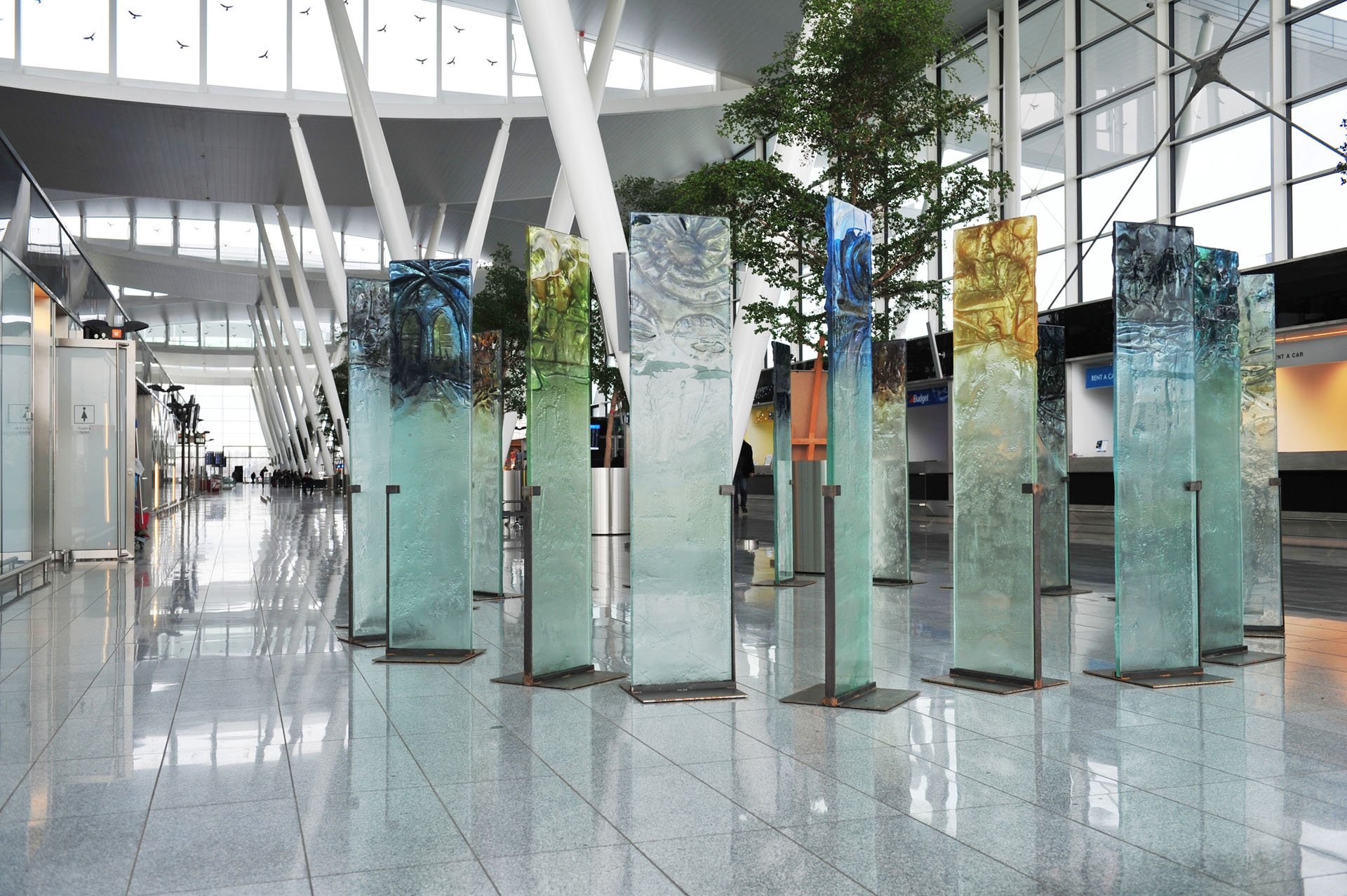
Contemporary free-standing Glasshenge series (2013/2014) by Tomasz Urbanowicz at Wrocław Airport, Poland

== See also ==
- Architectural glass
- Architecture of cathedrals and great churches
- Art Nouveau glass
- Autonomous stained glass
- Beveled glass
- British and Irish stained glass (1811–1918)
- English Gothic stained glass windows
- French Gothic stained glass windows
- Float glass
- Glass beadmaking
- List of stained glass windows in the Janskerk, Gouda
- Sagrada (board game)
- Stained glass conservation
- Studio glass
- Suncatcher
- Venetian glass
- Window
