= Breaker-grozier pliers =

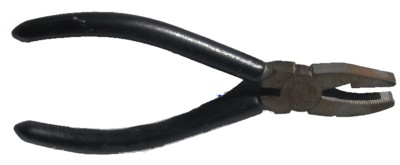
Breaker-grozier pliers

Breaker-grozier pliers, or groziers, are pliers used by glaziers to break and finish glass in a controlled manner, a technique known as grozing. They are dual purpose pliers, with a flat jaw that is used for breaking out scores and a curved jaw that is used for grozing flares from the edge of broken glass. Both jaws are serrated for removing flares and tiny points of glass.

== Use ==
To break out a score, the glass to be removed is held firmly in the pliers, with the flat jaw on top of the glass near the score line. A sharp bend downward breaks the glass at the score.

To remove unwanted glass flares and unwanted points, the glass piece is held with one hand with the pliers curved side up. A gentle upward rolling scrapes the glass edge against the serrated teeth and removes unwanted glass flares. This removal process is known as grozing.

The tips of these pliers can also be used in a chewing motion to remove small sections of glass or nibble out deep inside curves.

== Other tools ==
Glaziers also use single-purpose pliers such as breaking pliers, with two flat jaws, and running pliers, which apply even pressure on both sides of a score to make a controlled gentle break on the glass.

== See also ==
- Architectural glass
- Beveled glass
- Came glasswork
- Cathedral glass
- Fracture glass
- Fracture-streamer glass
- Ring mottle glass
- Rippled glass
- Stained glass
- Streamer glass
