= Leaded glass =

Leaded glass may refer to:

- Lead glass, potassium silicate glass which has been impregnated with a small amount of lead oxide in its fabrication
- Lead came glasswork, glass panels made by combining multiple small pieces of glass, which may be stained, textured or beveled, with cames or copper foil
  - Leadlight or leaded lights, decorative windows made of small sections of glass supported in lead cames
- Flint glass, an optical glass that has relatively high refractive index and low Abbe number
