= Rippled glass =

Textured glass

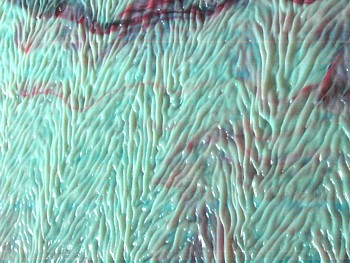
A sample of herringbone ripple glass

Rippled glass refers to textured glass with marked surface waves. Louis Comfort Tiffany made use of such textured glass to represent, for example, water or leaf veins.

The texture is created during the glass sheet-forming process. A sheet is formed from molten glass with a roller that spins on itself, while travelling forward. Normally the roller spins at the same speed as its own forward motion, and the resulting sheet has a smooth surface. In the manufacture of rippled glass, the roller spins faster than its own forward motion. The rippled effect is retained as the glass cools.

In order to cut rippled glass, the sheet may be scored on the smoother side with a carbide glass cutter and broken at the score line with breaker-grozier pliers.

== See also ==
- Architectural glass
- Beveled glass
- Came glasswork
- Cathedral glass
- Crown glass (window)
- Drapery glass
- Fracture glass
- Fracture-streamer glass
- Ring mottle glass
- Stained glass
- Streamer glass
