= Came glasswork =

Glass joined with came strips or foil

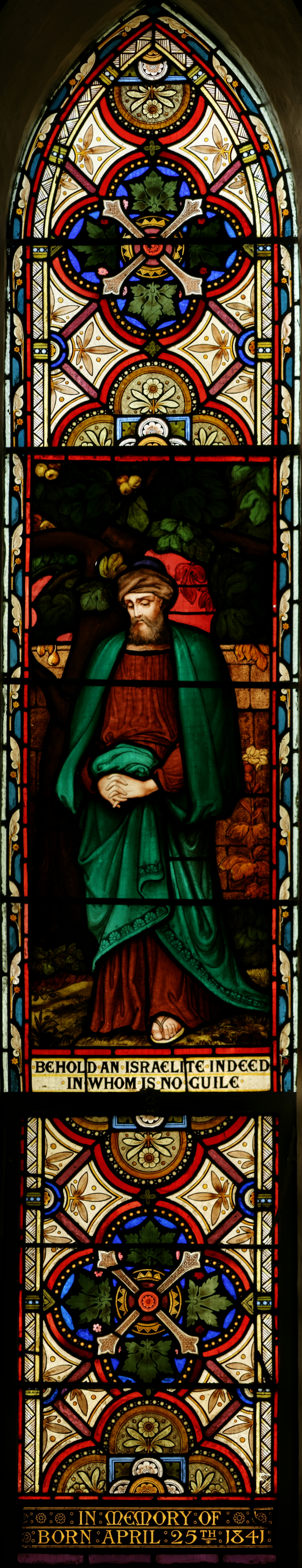
Lyon and Cottier, Stained glass panel in the transept of St. John's Anglican Church, Ashfield, New South Wales (NSW).

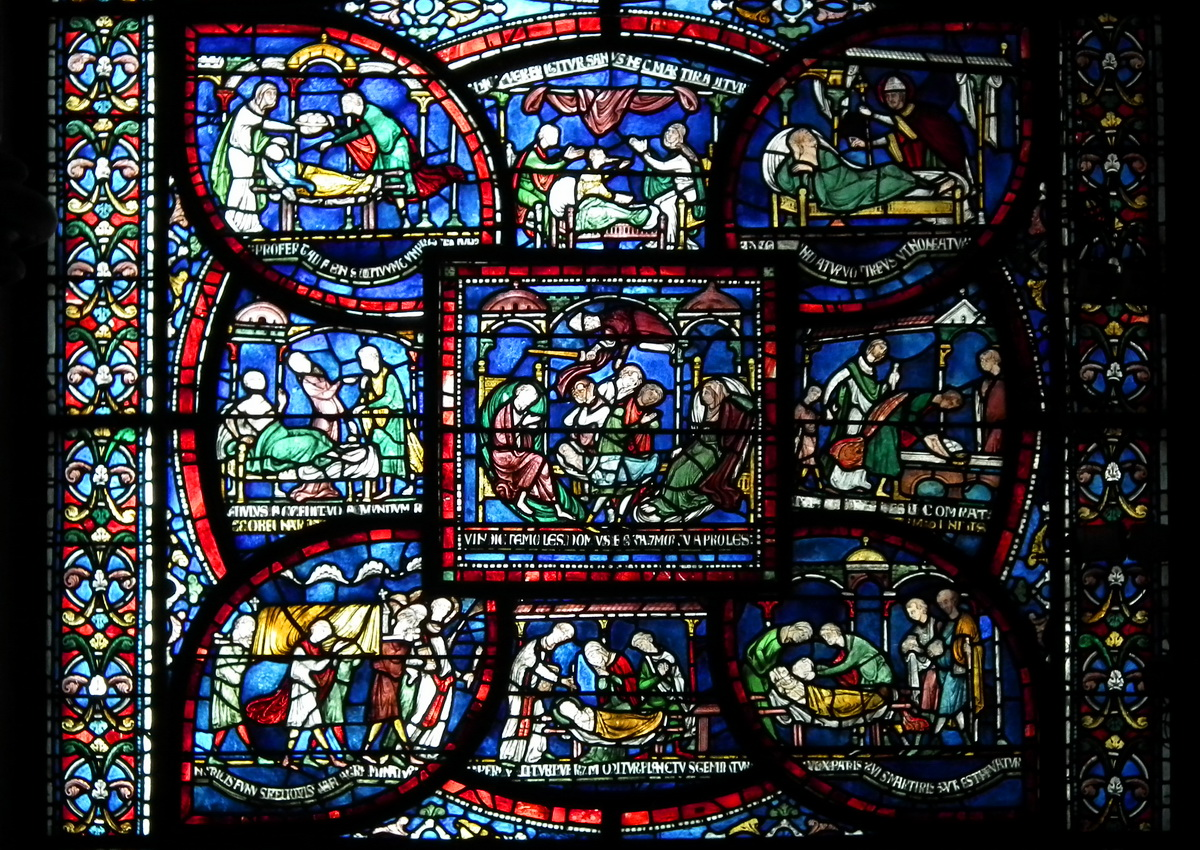
Canterbury, Canterbury cathedral-stained glass

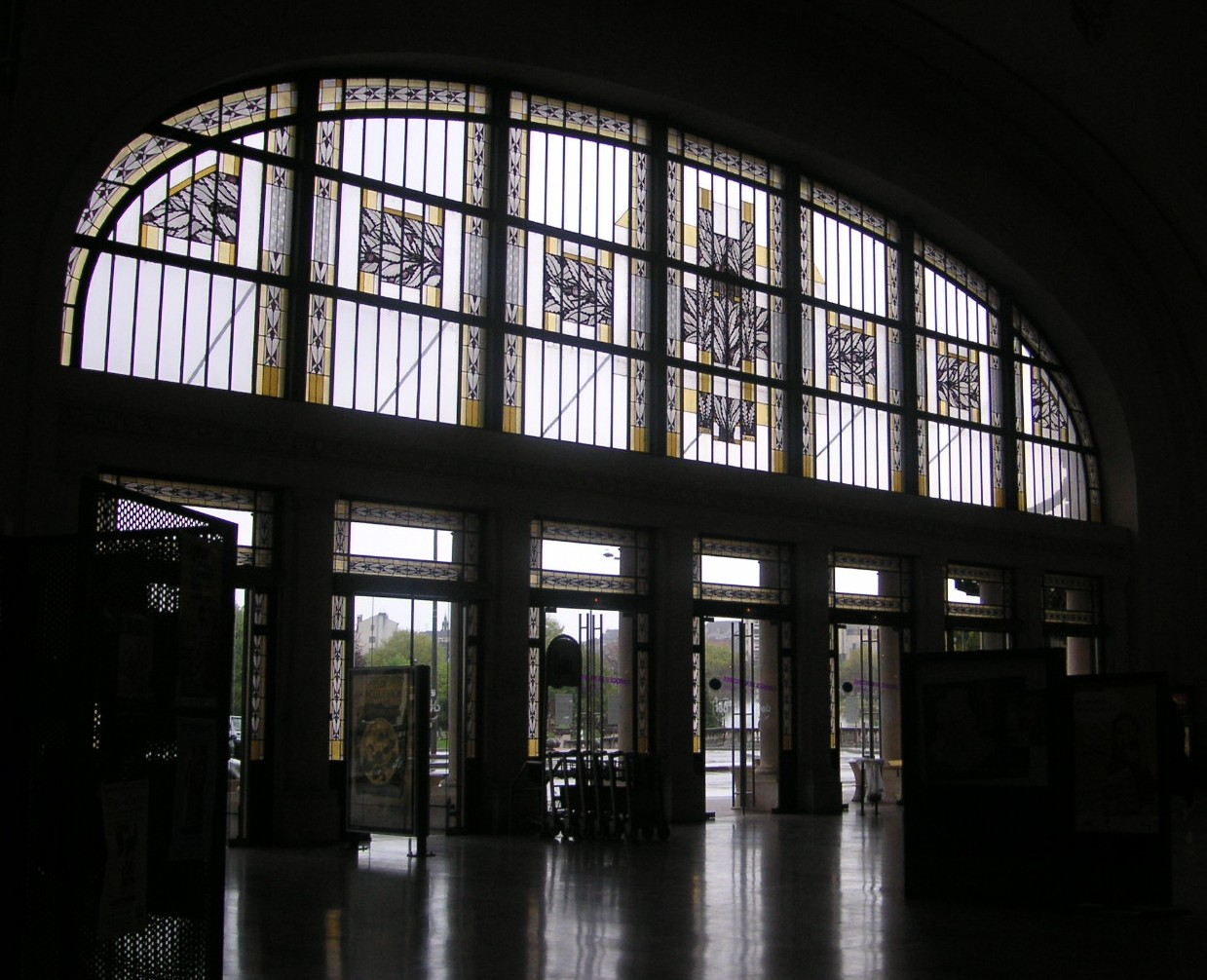
Railway station showing fine Art Déco leadlighting with grisaille and yellow stain. Limoges, France.

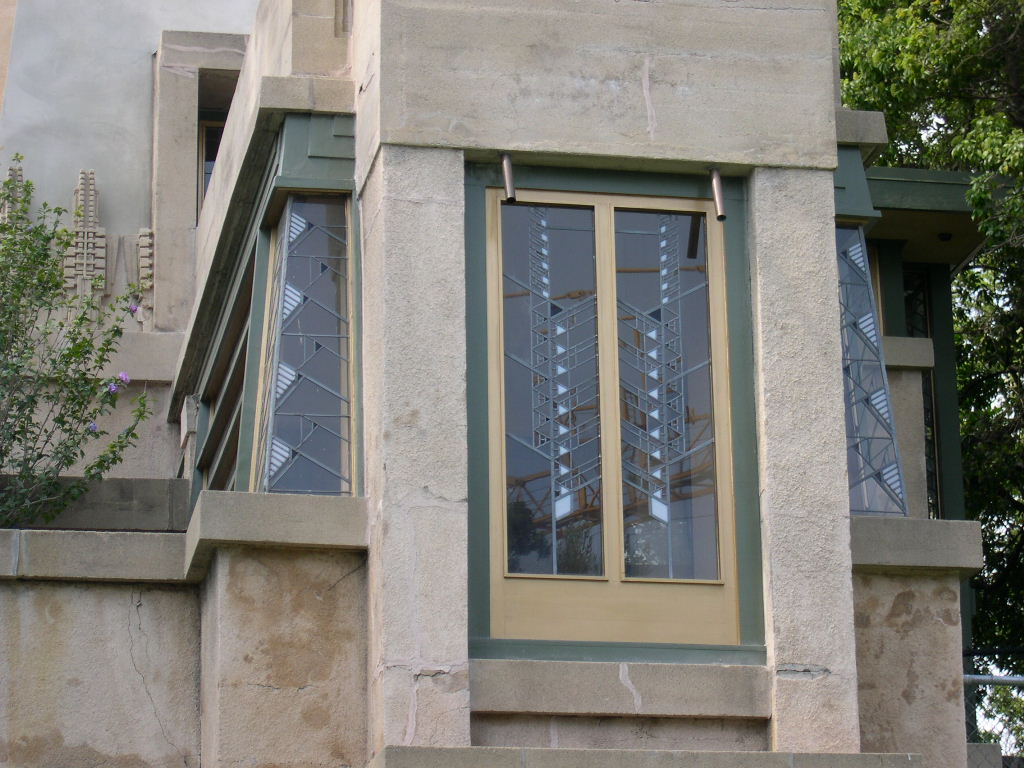
Frank Lloyd Wright, Hollyhock House, Los Angeles, CA

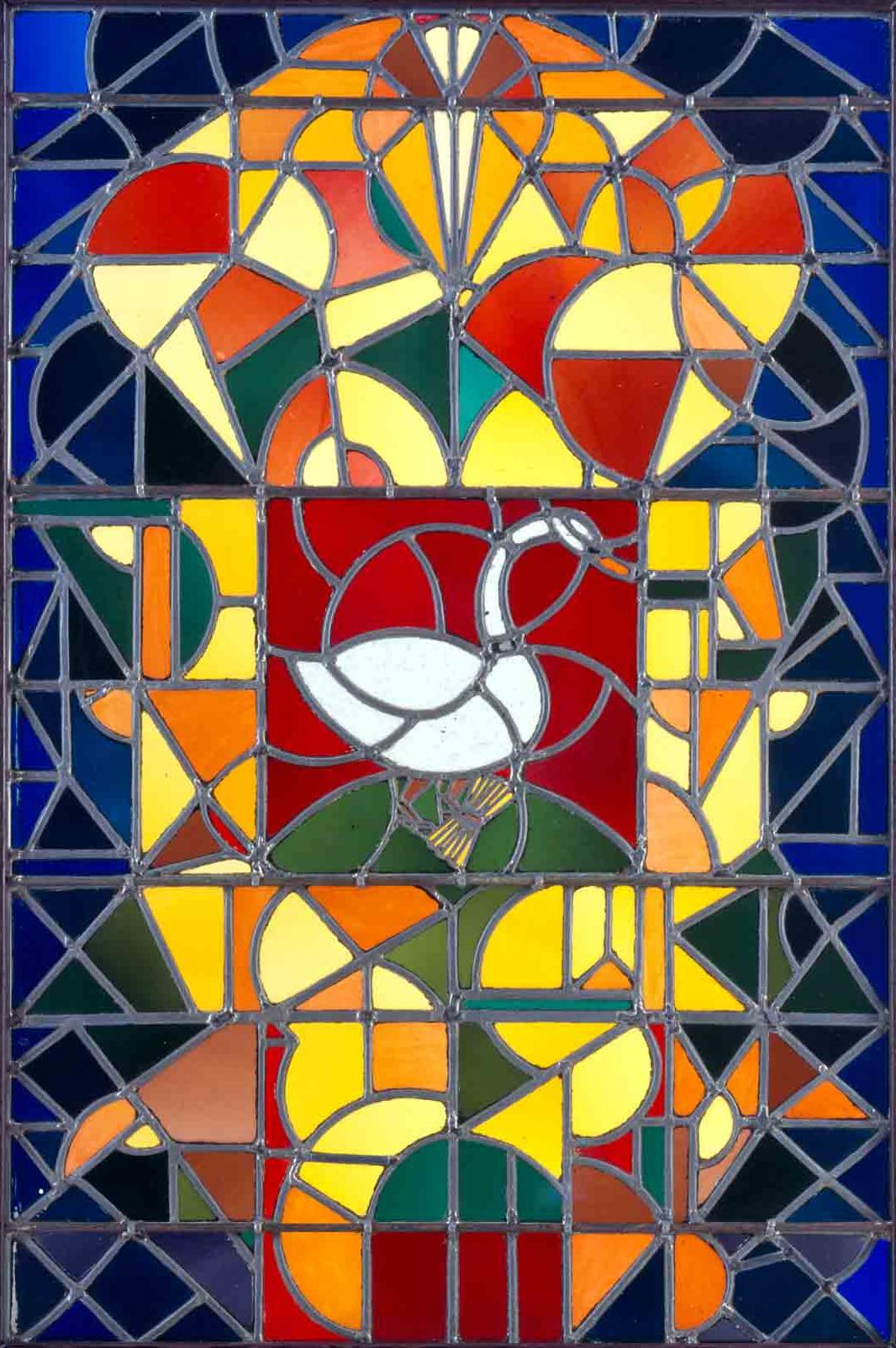
Theo van Doesburg, Leaded Glass Composition I

Came glasswork is the process of joining cut pieces of art glass through the use of came strips or foil into picturesque designs in a framework of soldered metal.

Final products include a wide range of glasswork, including stained glass and lead light pieces. Came is made of different metals, such as lead, zinc, brass and copper. The metal came selected generally depends upon the size, complexity and weight of the project. As an alternative to came, copper foil may be used, for small, intricate pieces.

== Overview ==
Came glasswork includes assembling pieces of cut and possibly painted glass using came sections. The joints where the came meet are soldered to bind the sections. When all of the glass pieces have been put within came and a border put around the entire work, pieces are cemented and supported as needed. The work may be made waterproof by forcing a soft oily cement or mastic between the glass and the cames. A form of embellishment and gilding, such as Angel gilding and Eglomise, may be added to finish the piece.

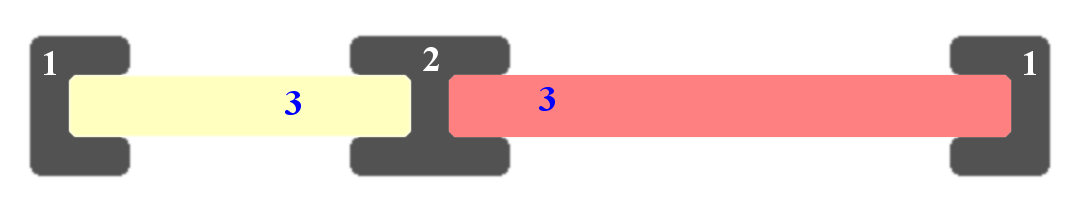
Schematic depiction of H- and U-shaped lead came cross sections, with embedded glass pieces.

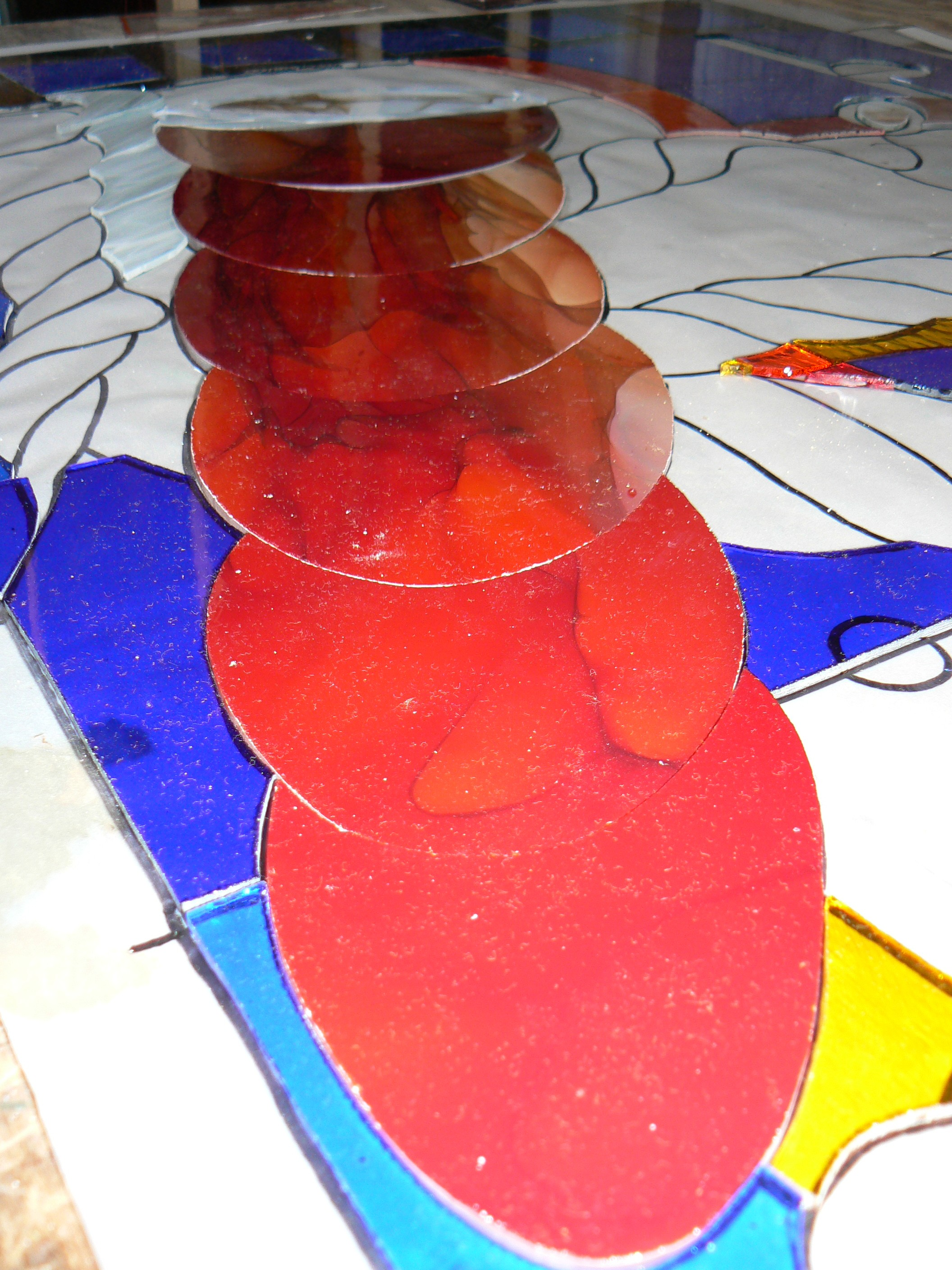
Glass art Tanja de Heus, Oldambt studio - the project is in process of being assembled

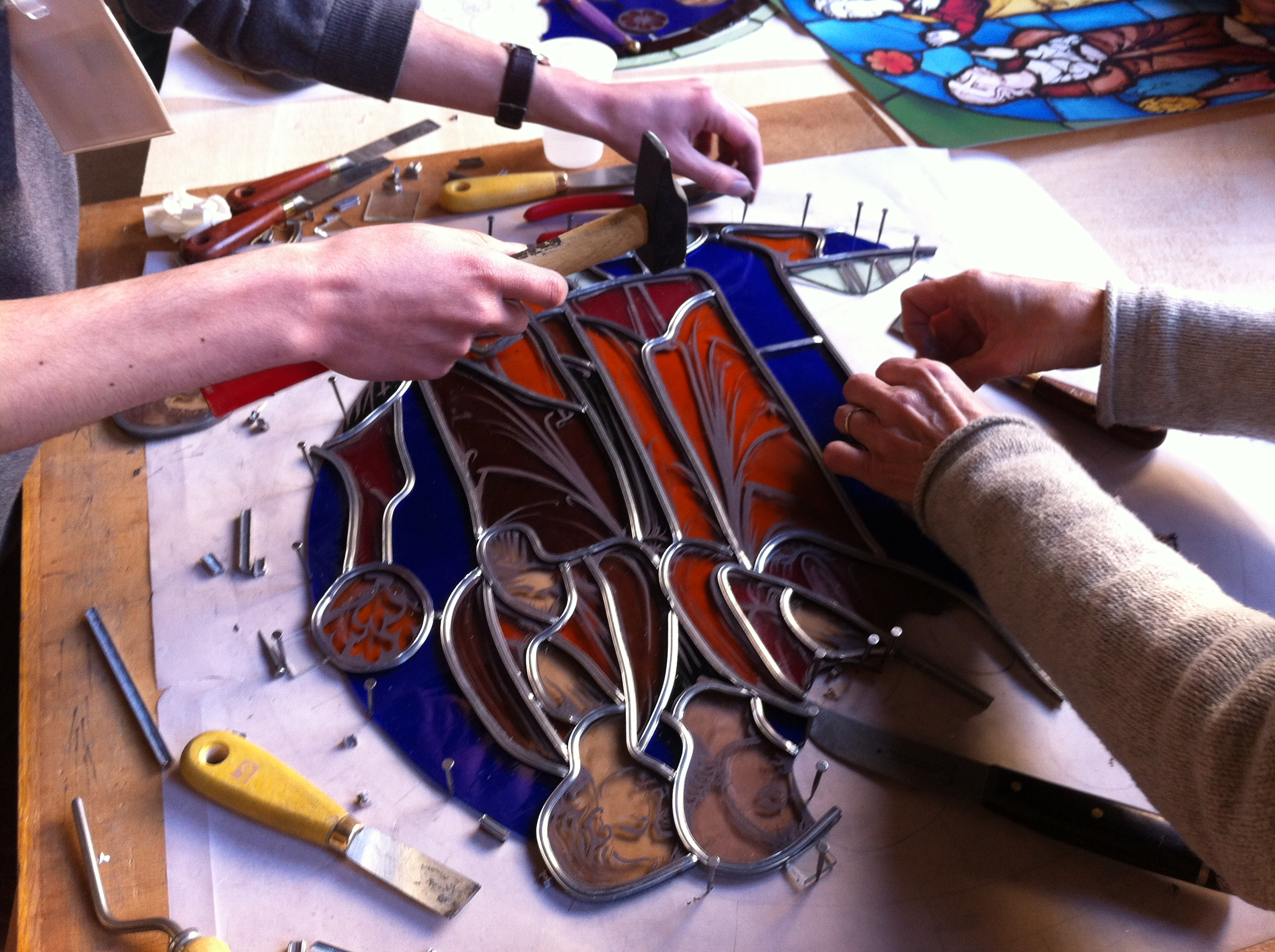
Musée de Cluny students at work in a stained glass workshop - assembling glass with came

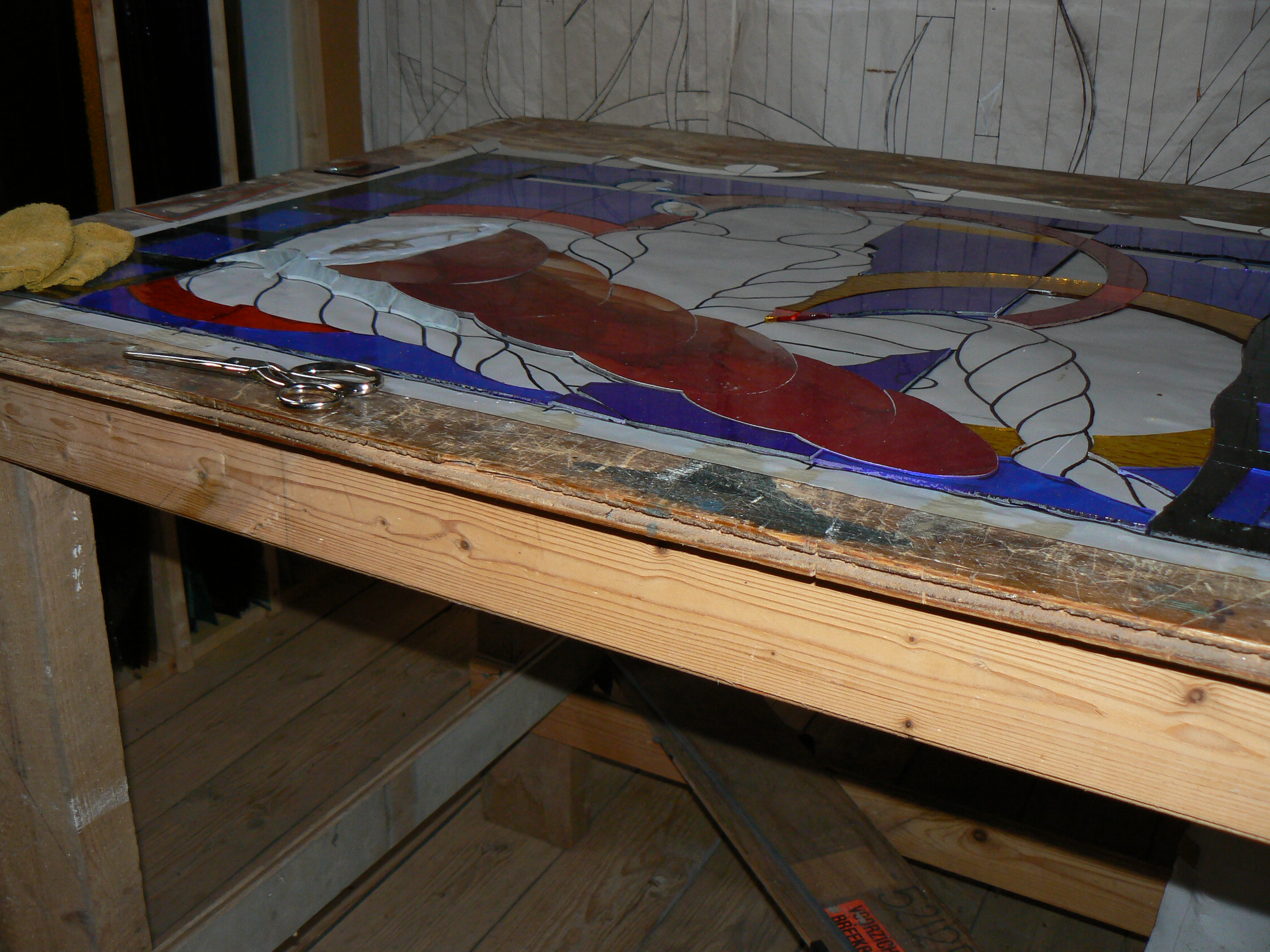
Glass art Tanja de Heus, Oldambt studio

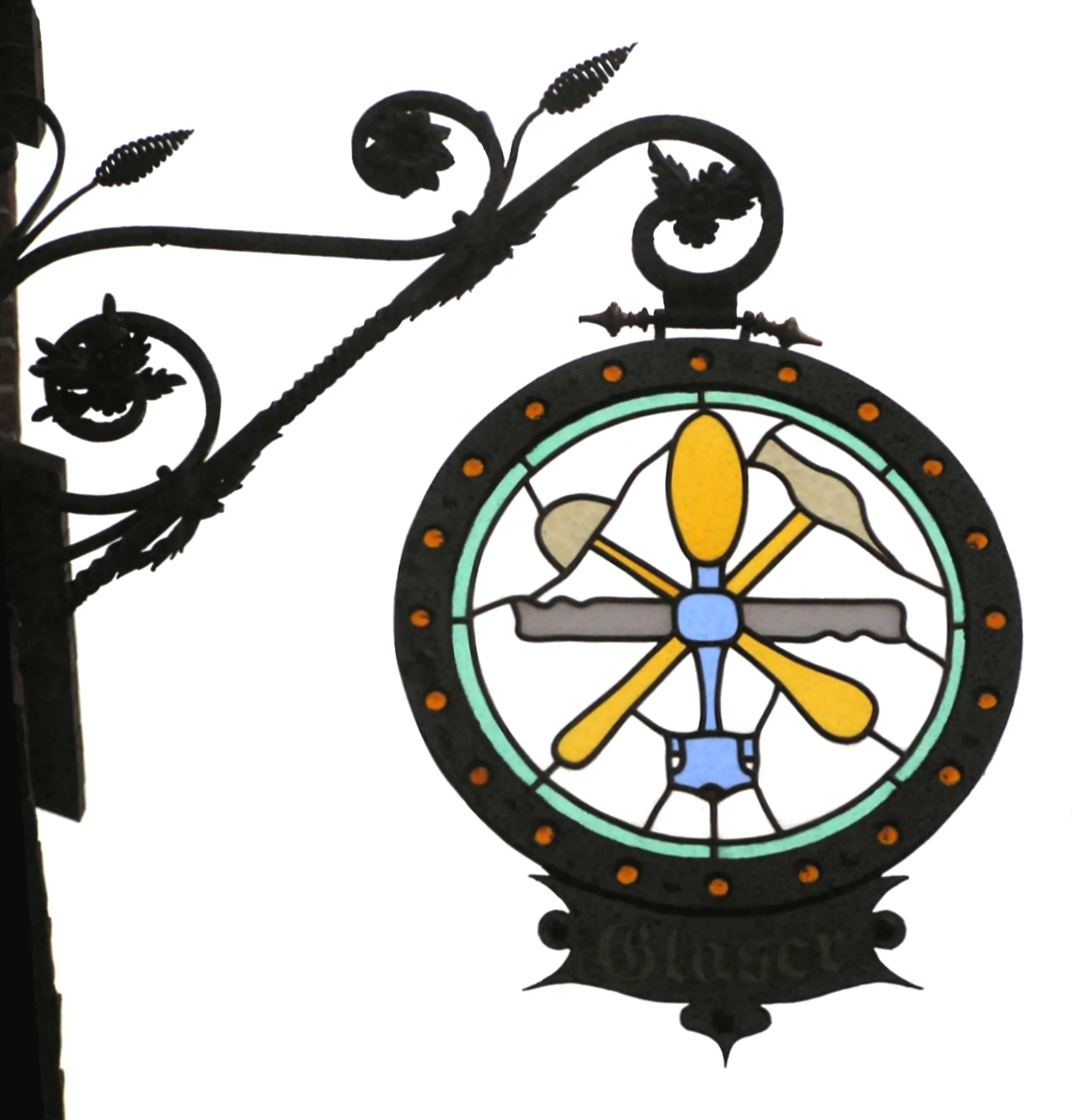
Stained glass sign of a glass worker, an example of a completed work

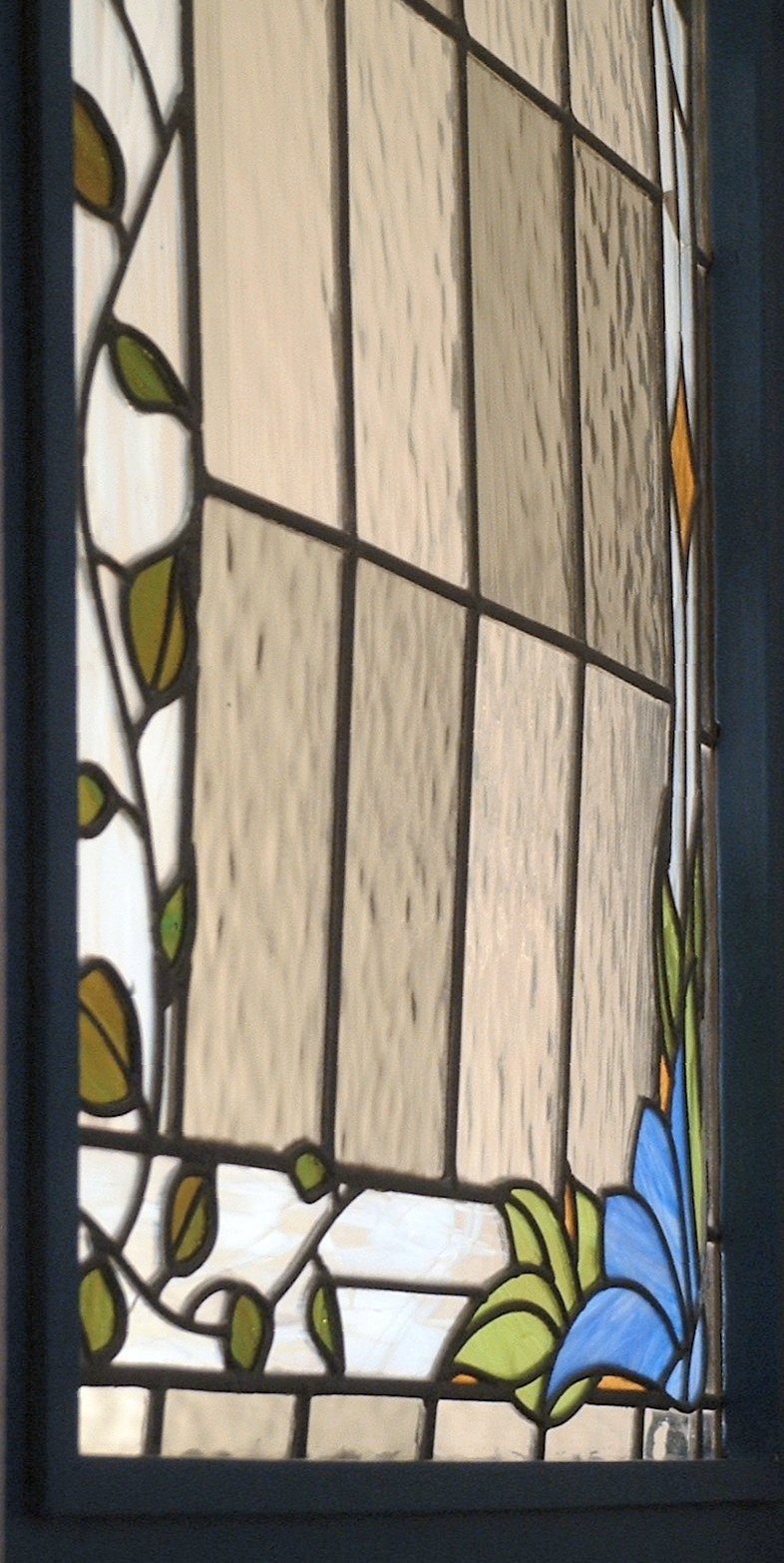
Buckled lead came window, an undesired result of completed work that requires restoration

Works may need to be reinforced, like large pieces or ones that will be exposed to the outdoor elements. Support can be provided as the piece is made through the use of reinforced and metal-covered lead came, the use of steel strips in the came channels, or use of rigid cames, such as copper, brass or zinc. Bars of steel or steel rebar may be attached to the back of finished works as reinforcement.

== History ==
Theophilus Presbyter, the first to write about joining art glass using the came technique in the book De Divers Artibus. Theophilus was a Benedictine Monk who was a glass and pigment worker who practiced in the late 11th and early 12th centuries.

== Materials ==
Materials to complete a glasswork project may include the pattern, cut glass, came, wood trim, solder, cement. Additional supplies include newspaper, cutter oil, a plywood board, masking tape, flux, (Note: Flux is used during the soldering process to better disperse heat from the soldering iron, improve the soldering process and to clean. Care should be taken to avoid contact to the skin or inhalation of its fumes.) and whiting. (Note: Whiting has two purposes. It is used to seal the glaze or cement. It is also used to clean residue off of the came and the project.)

=== Came ===
Lead came is often supplied in lengths of 2 m and in widths of differing sizes. It also comes in flat or domed profiles.

==== Brass and copper ====
Brass and copper have been used to bring a copper or golden hue to the works. Generally, though, they were used only for windows between about 1890 and 1920. Both metals were often alternatives to zinc for Frank Lloyd Wright designed windows.

==== Brass-capped lead ====
Brass-capped lead is another type of came used for glasswork projects.

==== Lead ====
The traditional method of creating "camework glass" uses lead came, which ages into a dark blue-gray patina. In comparison to other came metal strips, like brass, copper and zinc, lead is softer and more flexible, making it easier to cut and bend. It's also inexpensive and durable. A downside is that the finished projects may be prone to sagging due to lead's softness. This can be mitigated somewhat by stretching the lead to make it more rigid before it is used. Special precautions should be taken when working with this metal came to avoid lead contamination.

The lead came windows of the medieval churches are sturdier than those of the 19th century and much of the 20th century. The composition of lead came changed over time, at first by removing other metals to make a "pure lead" and then again during war years when lead was needed for ammunition. Since the 1970s a new form of lead, restoration lead, was developed based upon medieval lead's metal composition. Restoration lead is stronger than lead came of the prior 100 years or so.

Water tightness is achieved by brushing cement under the flanges of the leads to both faces prior to installation or by applying putty afterwards. Typically the cement consisted of linseed oil, whiting, lamp black and white spirit.

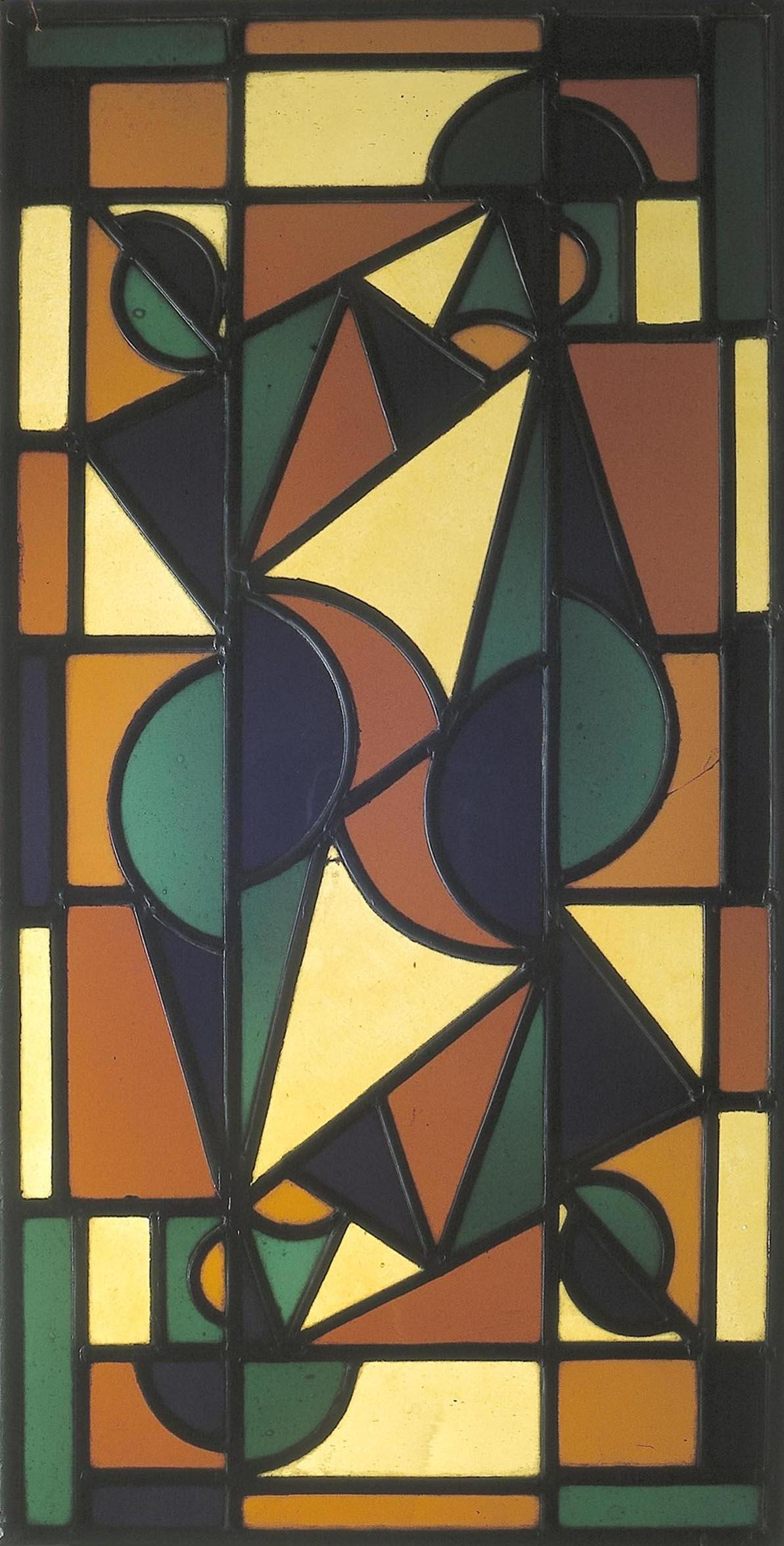
Theo van Doesburg, Dance II

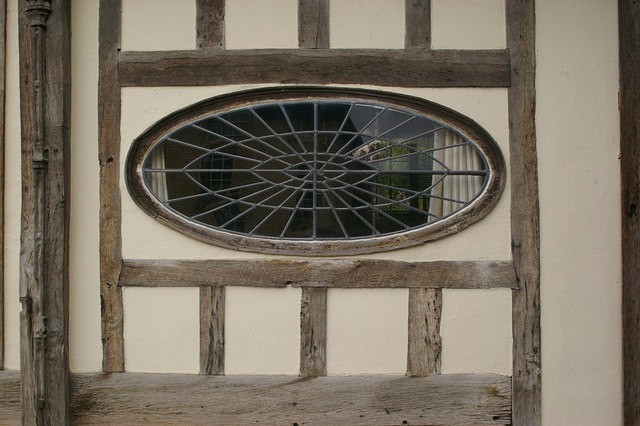
Leaded glass window, High Street, Saffron Walden. In this case the came is an integral part of the artistic composition.

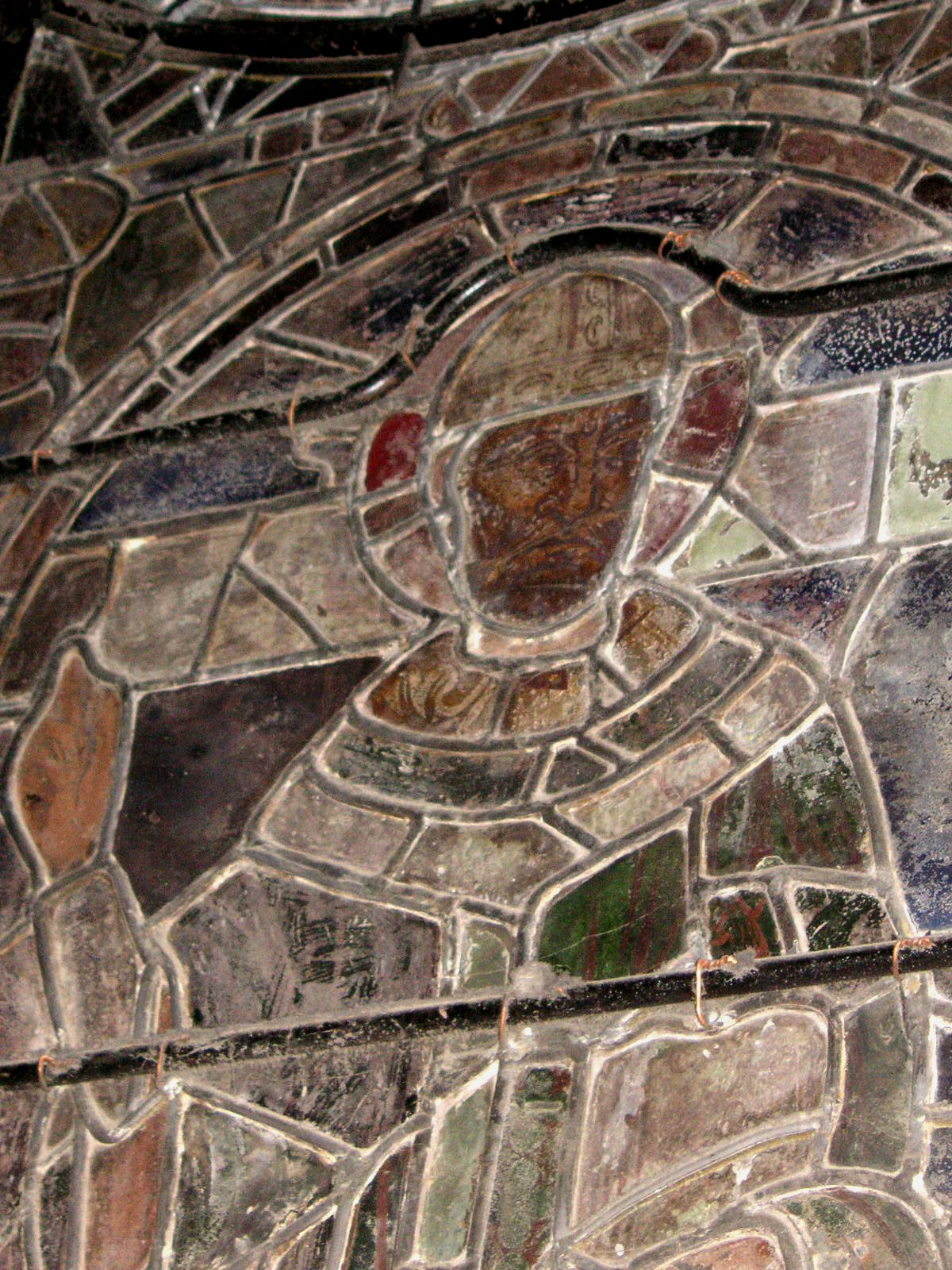
Canterbury Cathedral window is a 20th-century restoration using restoration lead cames and rods for structural support. It demonstrates good new leading, support, and the method of tying the lead to the rods.

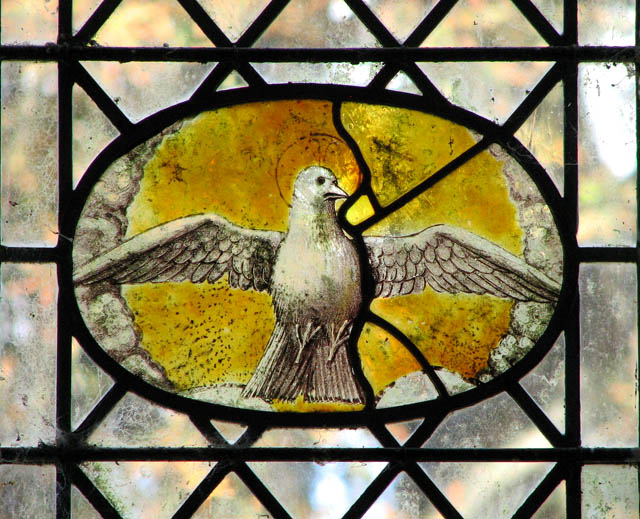
St Michael's church, Langley, Norfolk

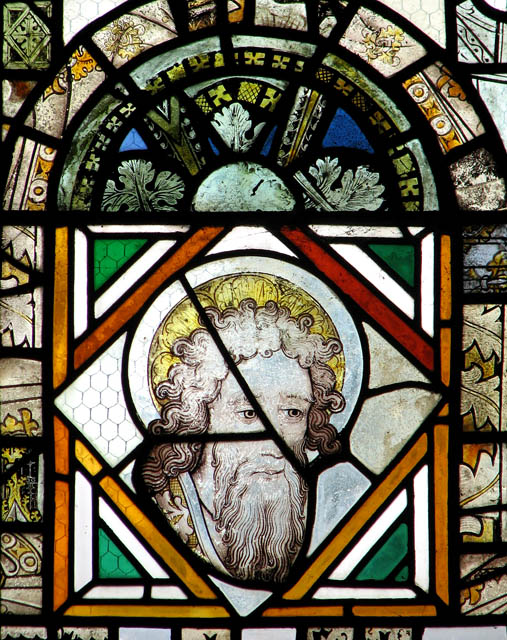
St Mary's church, Yaxley, Suffolk is also an example of came glasswork restoration

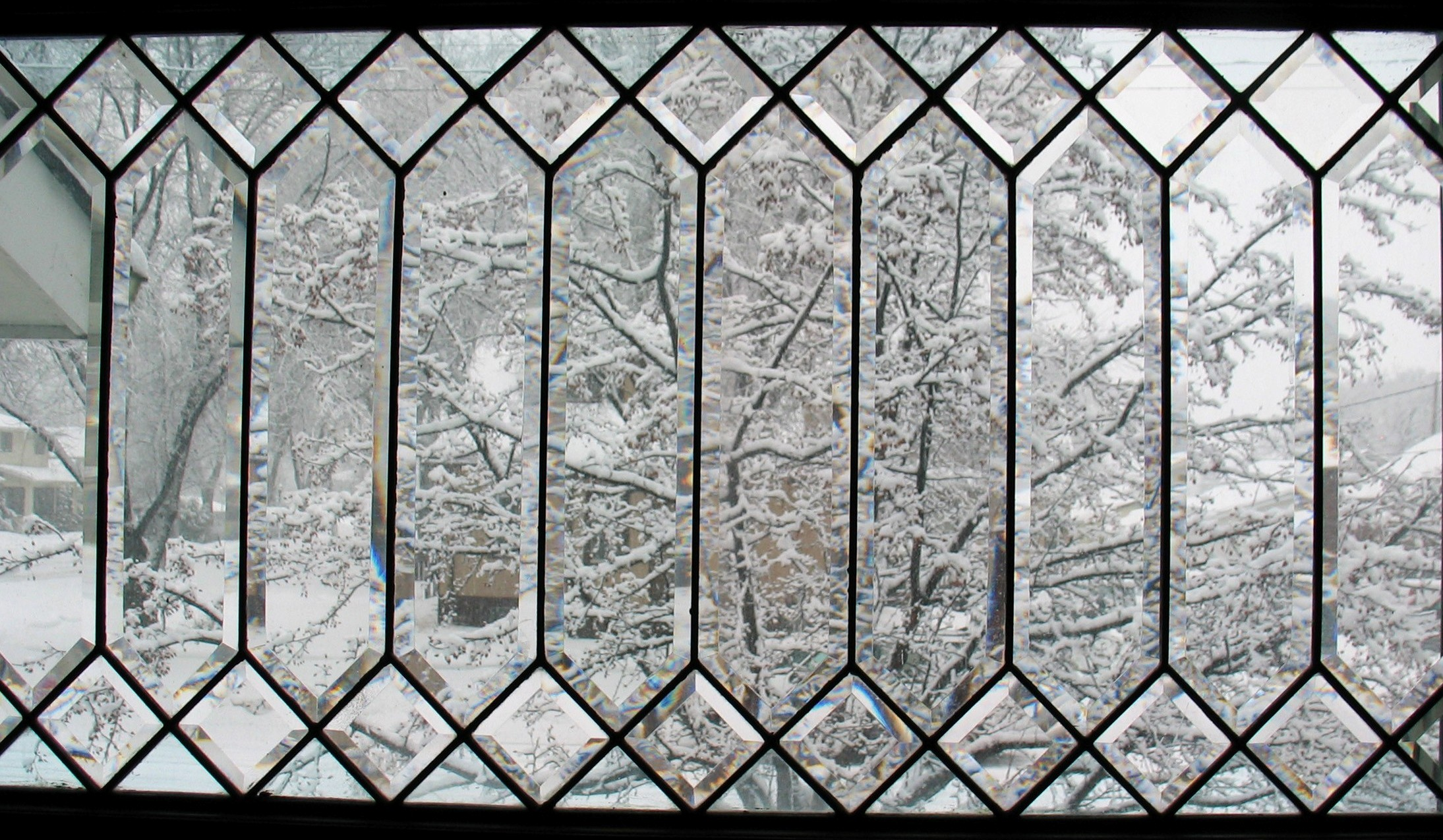
Many Victorian-style houses in the United States have decorative came glasswork windows with clear beveled glass panels

==== Zinc ====
Zinc makes a lightweight, strong and rigid came, which lends itself to glasswork projects that don't have many curved lines, are large, or have a number of straight lines that require greater support than lead would afford. Zinc accepts finishes, such as black and copper. Because of its strength, zinc is often used for border cames, which are U-channel cames for the outside edges.

Frank Lloyd Wright used zinc came for his stained glass windows. Beveled glass work is generally done in zinc came, primarily because of its ability to manage the weight of heavy plate glass; whereas beveled glass works made of lead came are much more likely to buckle or sag over time.

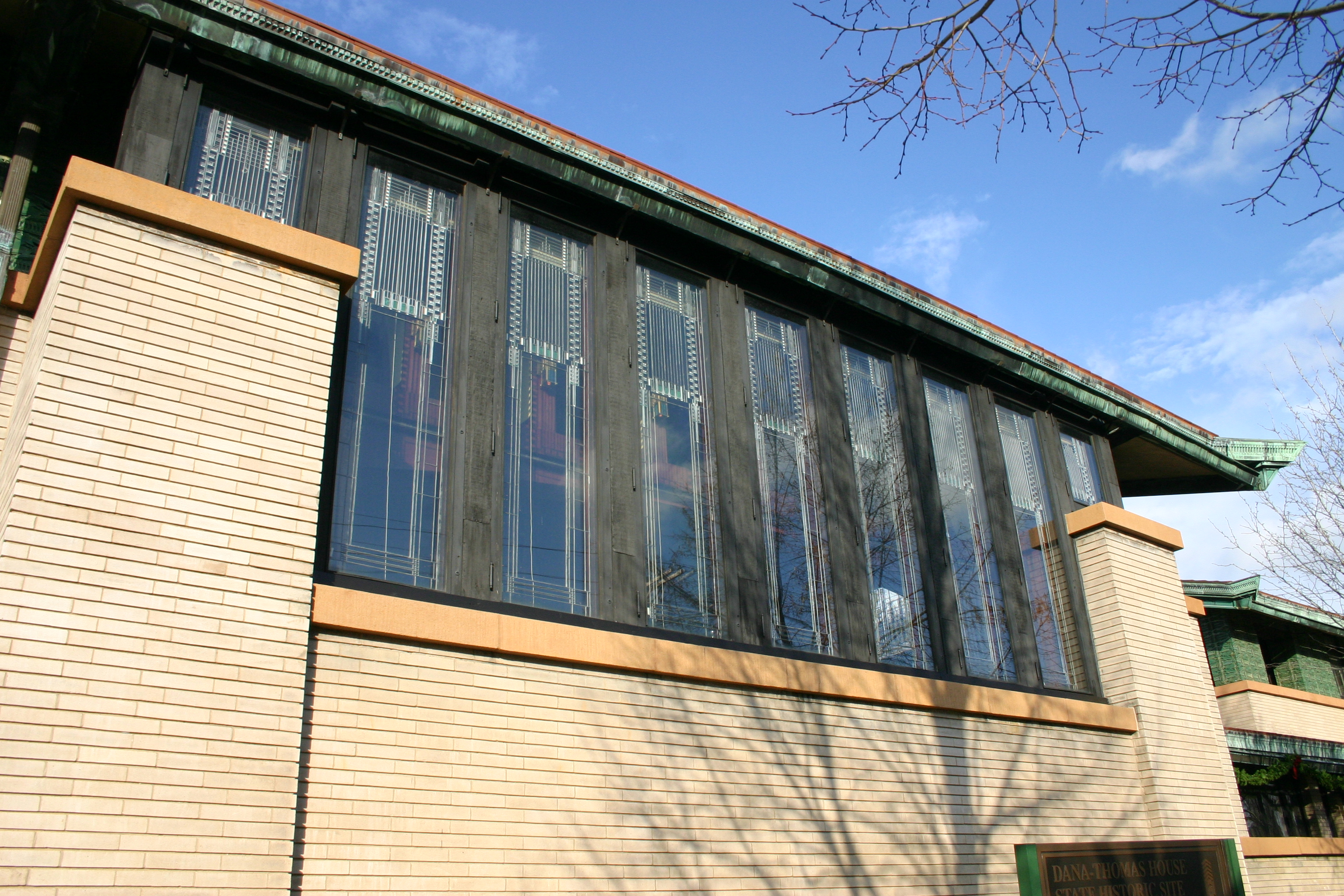
Windows on south wall of Frank Lloyd Wright's Dana-Thomas House, Springfield IL

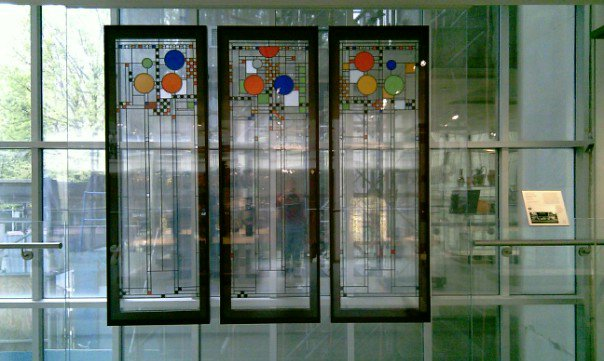
Windows now in the American Wing of the Metropolitan Museum of Art in New York City, designed by Frank Lloyd Wright

=== Copper foil ===
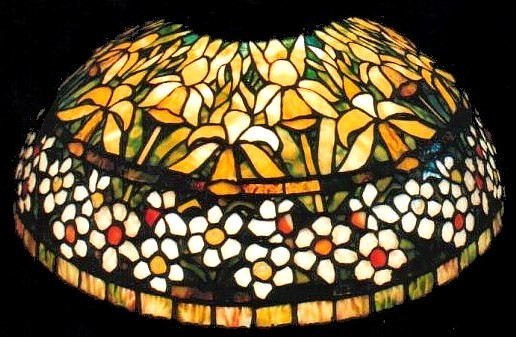
A typical copper foil Tiffany lamp, with a jonquil daffodil design

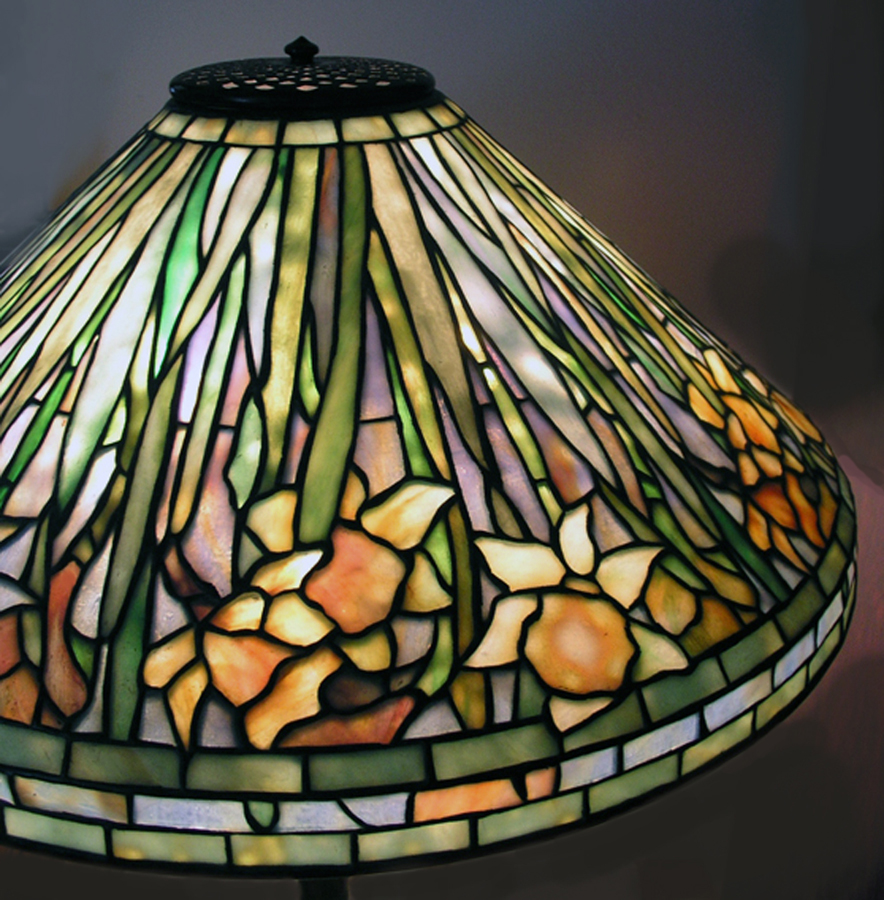
Clara Driscoll, head designer at Tiffany & Co., c. 1899–1920, Tiffany "Daffodil" leaded glass table lamp. This is an example of copper foil glasswork, an alternative to came glasswork.

Copper foil is an easy, versatile alternative to came and is particularly useful for small projects. Using copper foil, the edges of the glass pieces are wrapped with adhesive copper tape and soldered together along the adjacent copper strips. A patent for the method of "Joining Glass Mosaics" was issued to Sanford Bray in 1886, This new method of joining pieces of stained glass used copper/copper foil instead of lead sashes. By using copper foil, one could now make cylinders, cones, and globe-shaped shades or many other irregular forms.

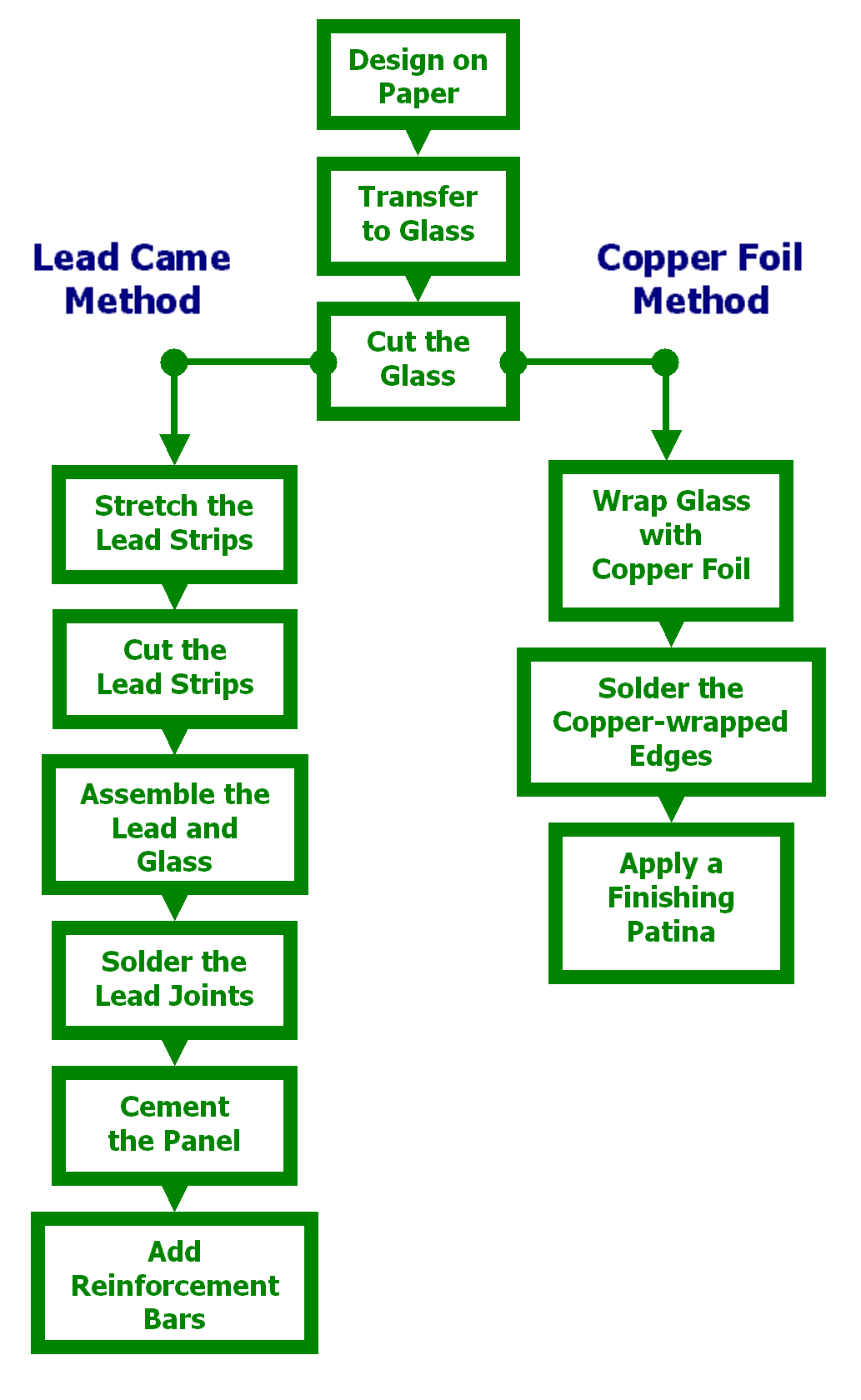
Comparison of the steps to use lead vs. copper foil came

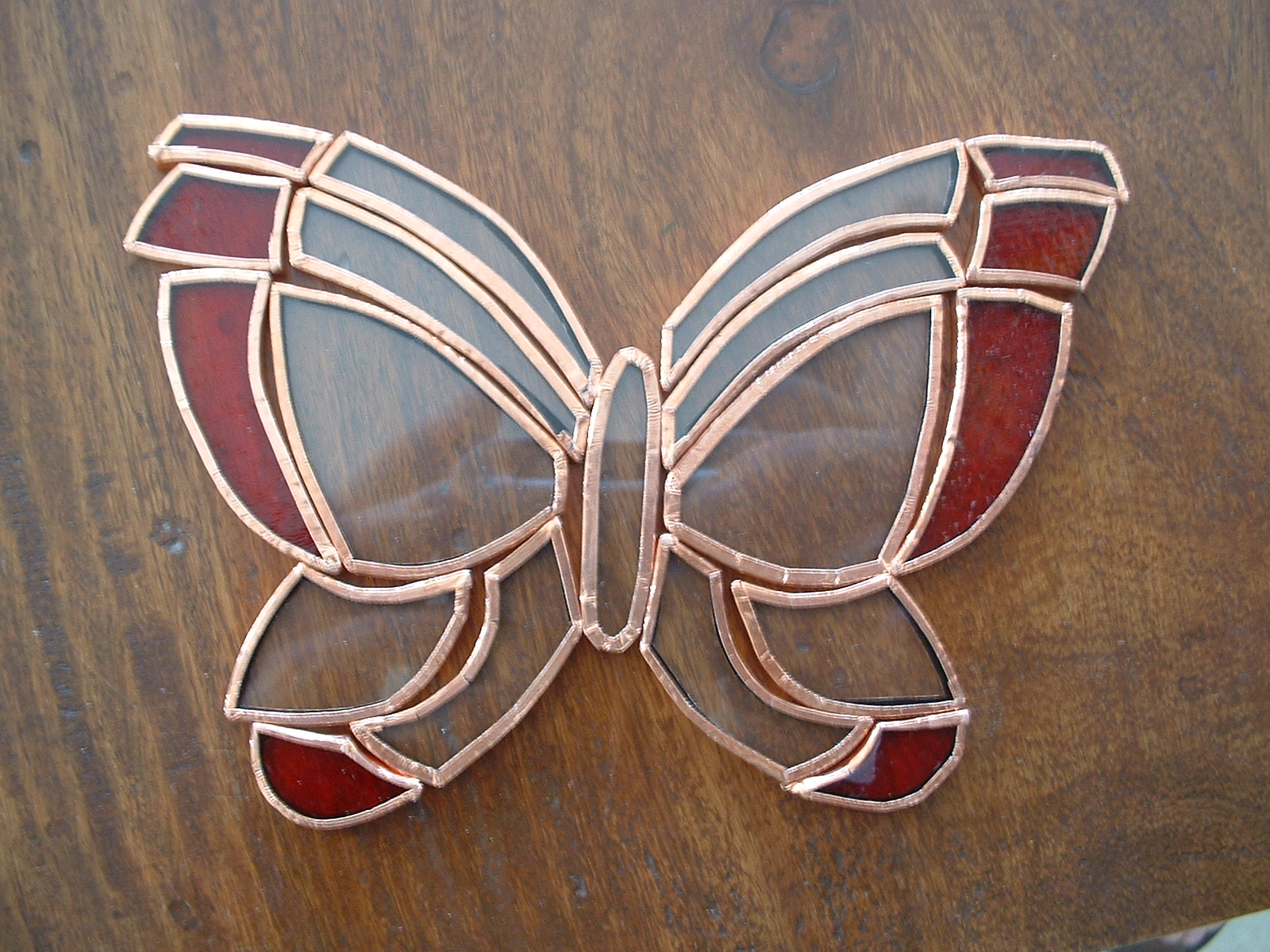
Glass pieces wrapped with copper foil, before soldering

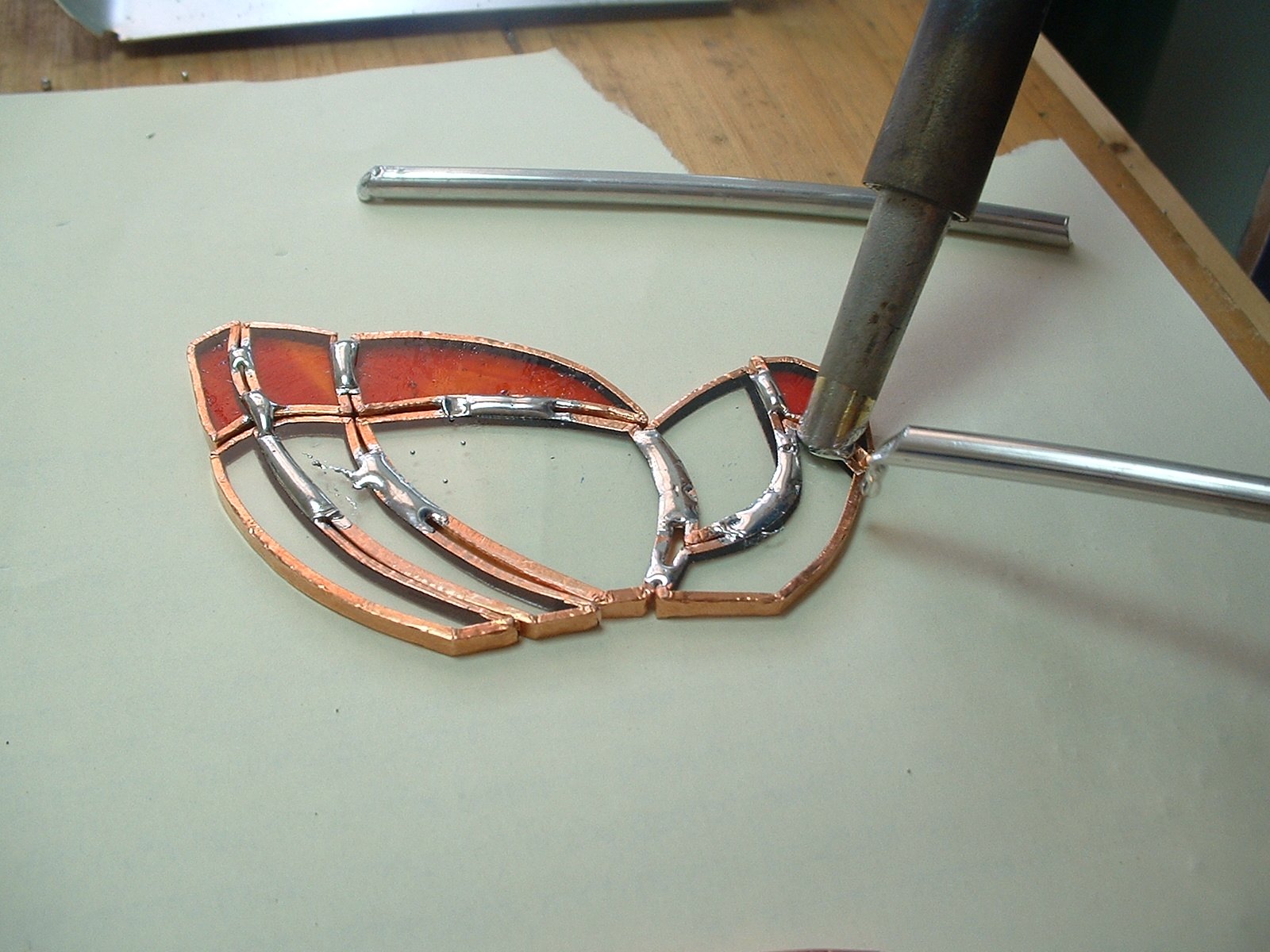
Copper foil glasswork soldering

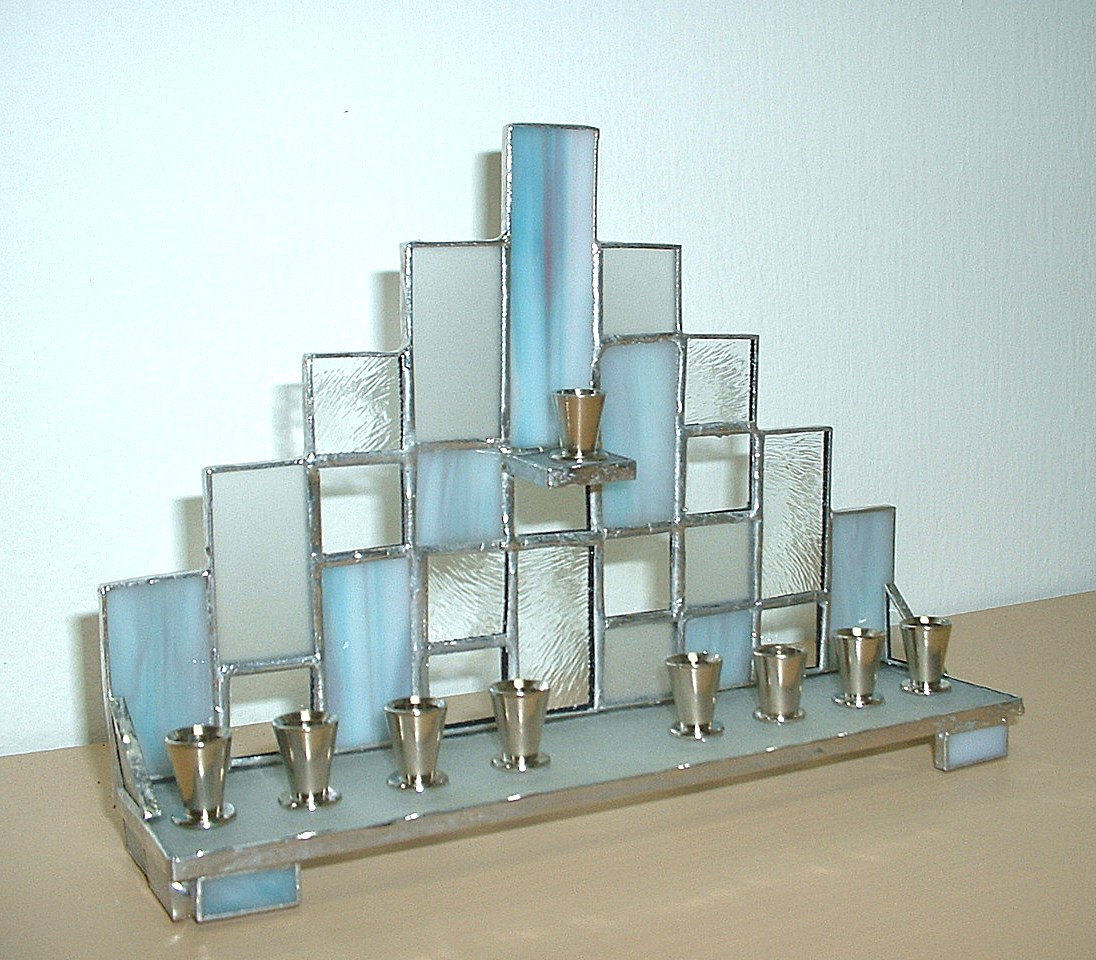
Copper foil glasswork Hanukkah menorah

== Tools ==
Tools to complete a glasswork project can include:

- brushes: toothbrush, scrub brush, flux brush or cotton swabs
- carbide grinding stone
- cloths
- cork-backed straightedge
- crimper or burnisher, for copper foil
- glass cutter
- glass grinder
- glazing hammer
- gloves
- hammer and horseshoe nails
- lathekin
- mask: dust mask or respirator
- metal files
- patinas
- permanent marker
- pliers: breaker-grozier, combination, running
- safety glasses
- saw: miter came saw, hacksaw or side cutters
- scissors
- soldering iron
- sponge
- utility knife
- vise
- wire brush
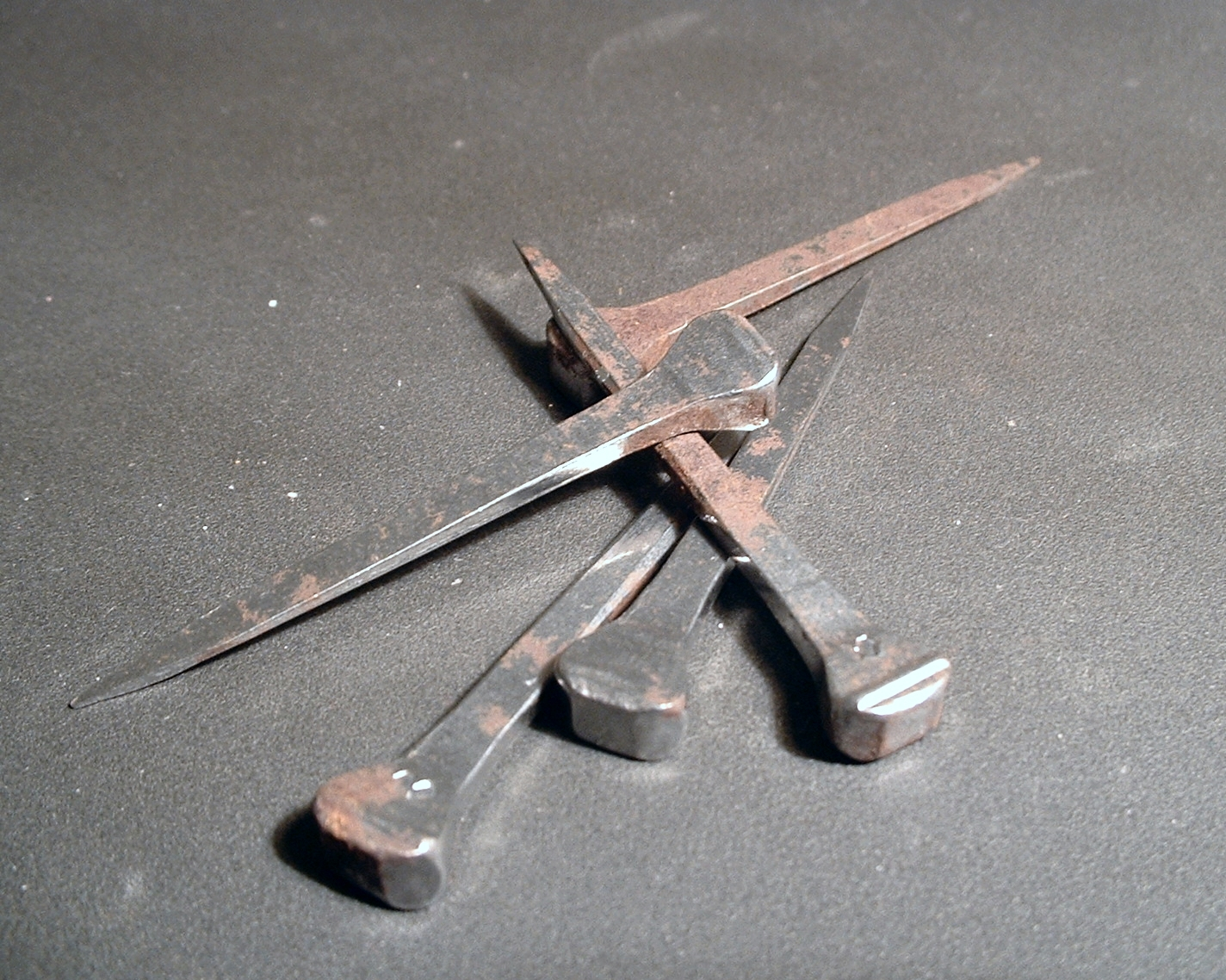
Horseshoe nails for lead came glasswork

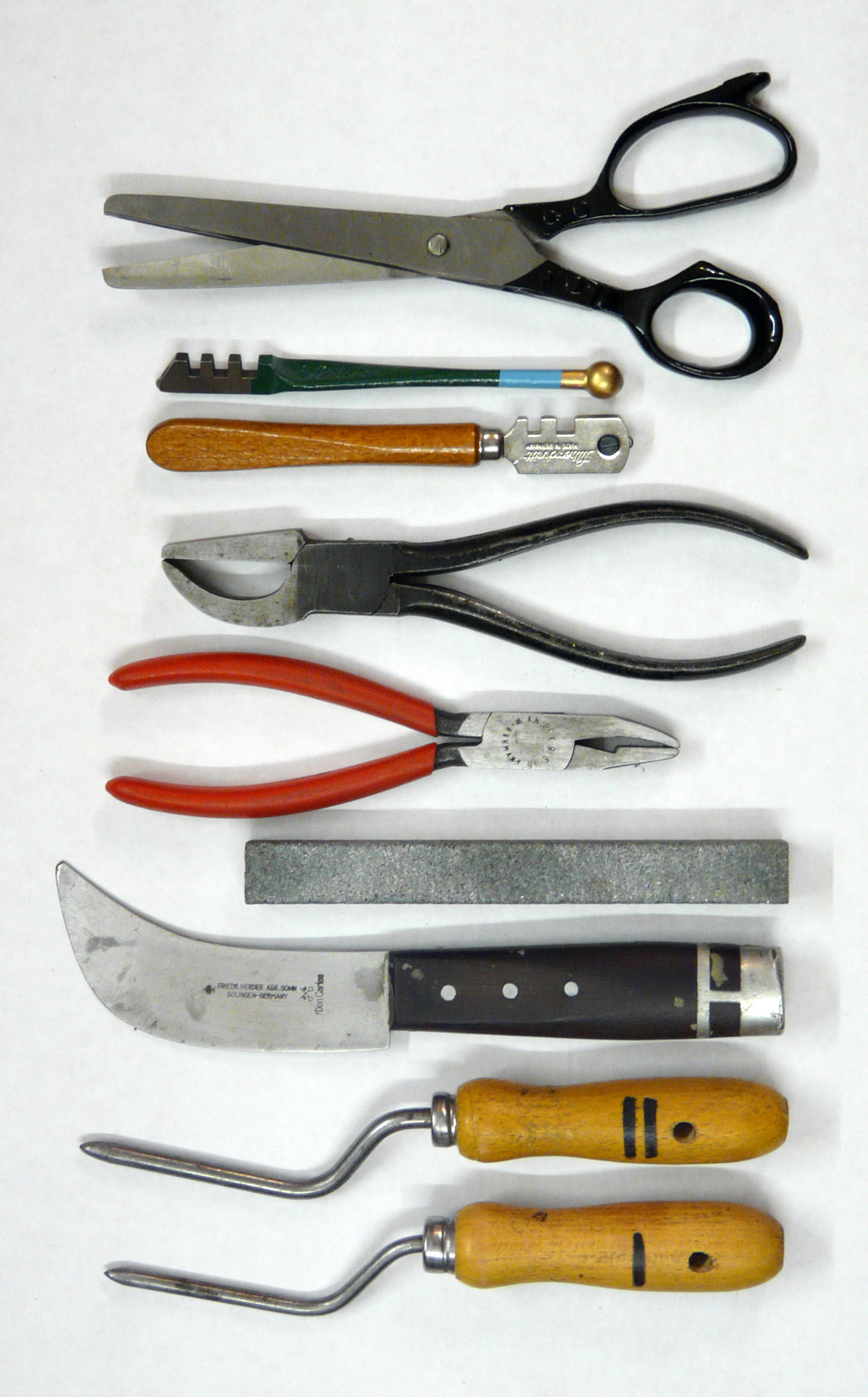
Glazier tools

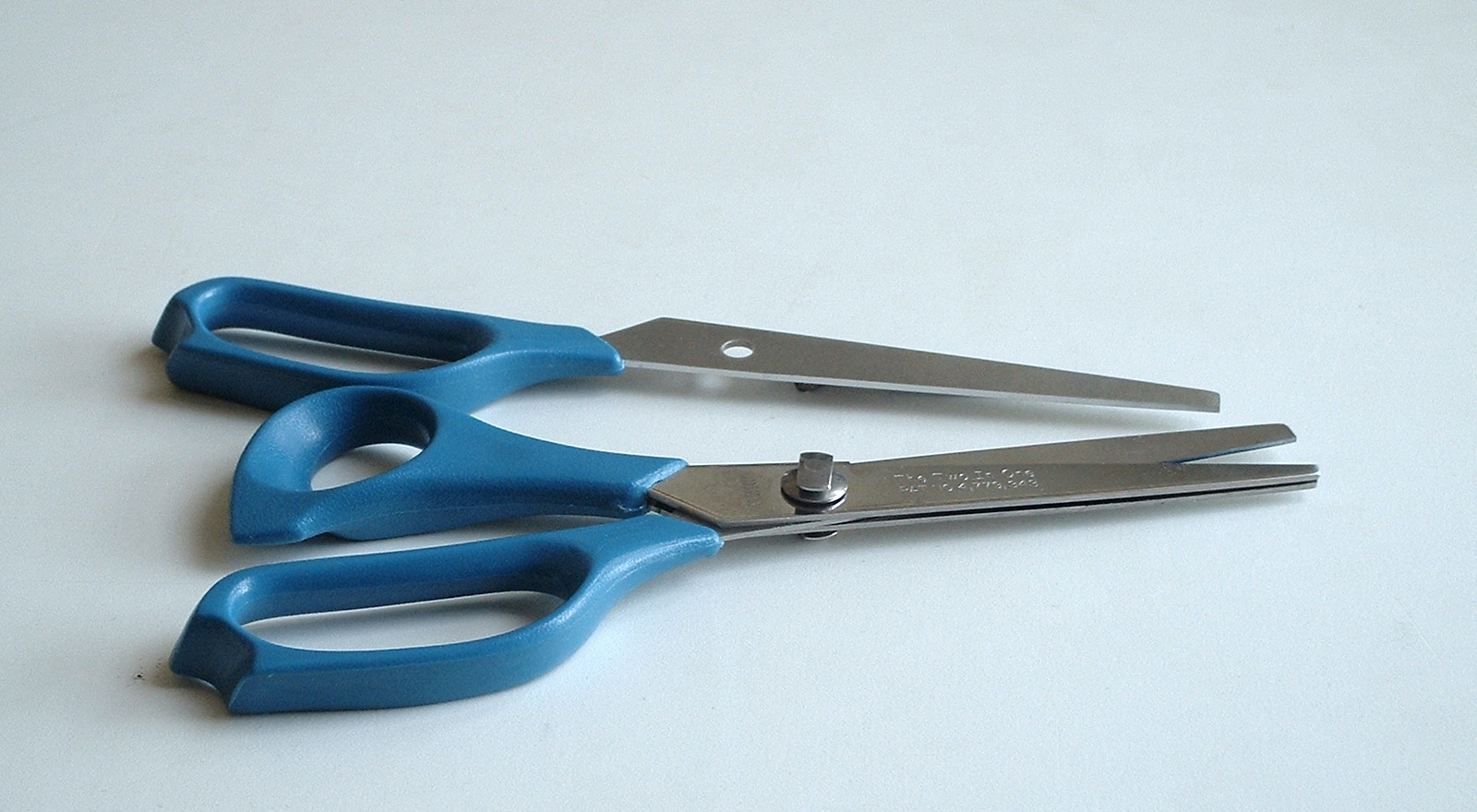
Triple blade pattern shears for glasswork

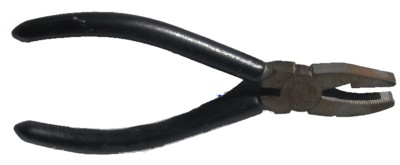
Breaker-grozier pliers

== See also ==
- Qamariya Mosque
