= Beveled glass =

Glass with an angled surface at the edge

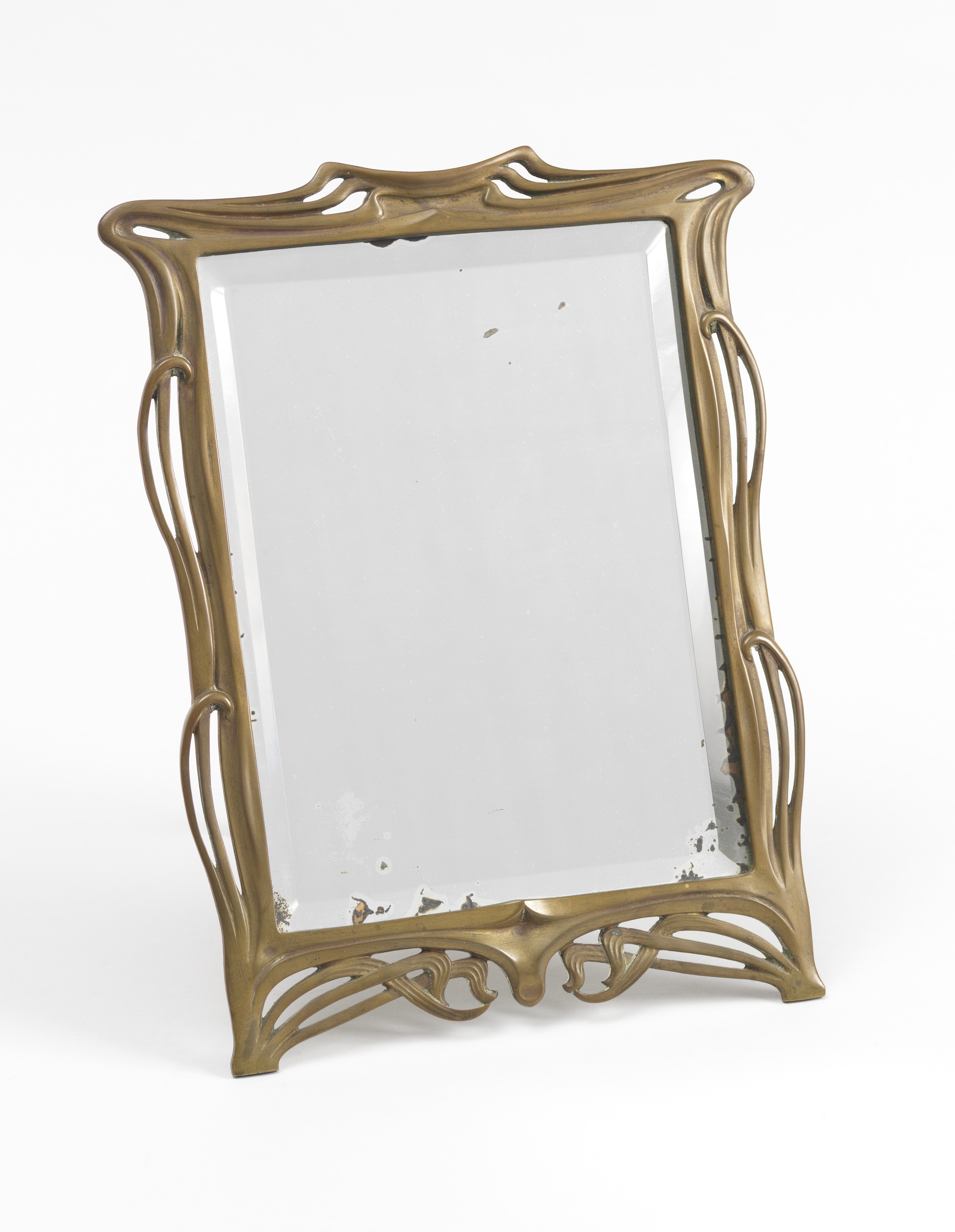
A beveled glass mirror, ca. 1910

Beveled glass is usually made by taking thick glass and creating an angled surface cut (bevel) around the entire periphery. Bevels act as prisms in sunlight creating an interesting color refraction which both highlights the glass work and provides a spectrum of colors which would ordinarily be absent in clear float glass.

Beveled glass can be obtained as clusters which are arranged to create a specific design. These can vary from simple three or four piece designs, often used in top lights (commonly known as transoms) of windows and conservatories, to more complex combinations of many pieces, suitable for larger panels such as doors and side screens (known in the door industry as sidelites).

Beveled glass has also been used with clear and colored textured glass to create designs. Textured glass is typically 1/8 inch (3 mm) thick and has a distinct visible texture. Beveled glass is typical made from 1/4 inch (6 mm) float plate glass but thicknesses up to 1/2 inch (10 mm) have been used for larger windows. The width of the bevel also can vary depending on the desired effect. The combination of beveled glass is juxtaposed to the textured glass creating dramatic visual effects.

Beveling was traditionally done manually by grinding and polishing operations:

The bevel is obtained by holding the glass against a horizontal roughing wheel, sand and water also playing an important part in the operation. The bevel, like the surface, must also be polished. An emory wheel is used to remove the sand and clean the surface. Then after being held against a horizontal grindstone, a polishing wheel with pumice stone is used. To brighten the glass, a buffing wheel with rouge upon it is employed.

Modern beveled glass is machine made. The automation of this traditionally hand made craft was facilitated by the development of plastic based metal deburring wheels which provided adequate smoothing of the ground glass face without the difficulties involved with traditional aluminum oxide and natural sandstone smoothing stones. The best natural smoothing stones came from a quarry in Newcastle, England and would be round wheels with a central hole several feet in diameter and 8 inches (200 mm) thick. The stone's quality was dictated by the consistency of the sandstone, as any imperfection would scratch the glass being smoothed. These large stones would smooth the rough scratches created by the grinding process. The type of grinding and smoothing equipment depended upon whether one was creating straight line, outside or inside curved bevels. Outside curves and straight lines are ground on a flat rotating platter covered in a thin slurry of silicon carbide and water. Inside curves were ground on a silicon carbide grinding wheel of appropriate grit with water running on the wheel. Smoothing the ground face was done using the Newcastle stone for outside curves and straight line bevels and a cone shaped polishing wheel of relatively fine grit aluminum oxide.

Despite the advantages of the plastic smoothing wheels, the crispness of the bevel edge is superior on the stone smoothed traditionally beveled pieces and can distinguish hand made beveled glass. The final step was polishing the beveled face using a felt covered wheel with a slurry of water and optical polishing powder. It was not uncommon to have pieces with a combination of outside and inside curve as well as straight line bevels. The objective was to have an even bevel width, even edge thickness with no facets in the bevel face and a crisp bevel edge.

In the early 1900s in USA it was not uncommon to see beveled oval door glass 5 feet (1.5 m) in length with 2-inch (50 mm) wide bevels on 3/8-inch (10 mm) thick plate glass. Creating such bevels required two craftsmen working as a team.

== See also ==
- Architectural glass
- Came glasswork
- Cathedral glass
- Drapery glass
- Fracture glass
- Fracture-streamer glass
- Ring mottle glass
- Rippled glass
- Stained glass
- Streamer glass
