= Cathedral glass =

Type of glass

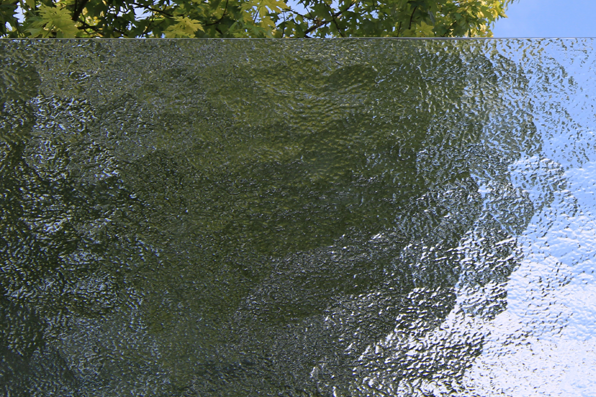
A sheet of cathedral glass

Cathedral glass is the name given commercially to monochromatic sheet glass. It is thin by comparison with 'slab glass', may be coloured, and is textured on one side. The name draws from the fact that windows of stained glass were a feature of medieval European cathedrals from the 10th century onward.

The term 'cathedral glass' is sometimes applied erroneously to the windows of cathedrals as an alternative to the term 'stained glass'. Stained glass is the material and the art form of making coloured windows of elaborate or pictorial design.

== Manufacture ==
=== Traditional methods of making coloured glass ===
Very early architectural glass, like that sometimes found in excavations of Roman baths, was cast. The molten glass was poured into a mould of wood or stone to make a sheet of glass. The texture of the mould material would be picked up by the glass.

By the time stained glass was being made, the glassblowing pipe was in common use, so hand-blown (or mouth-blown) sheets were made by the cylinder glass and/or crown glass method.

Casting came back as a common technique when rolled glass began to be manufactured in the mid-1830s and as glass jewels (also used for architectural glass) became popular. Rolled glass is not as rich and translucent as hand-blown glass, but it is much cheaper and is made in a variety of colours and textures, making it a useful decorative material.

=== Modern methods of making cathedral glass ===
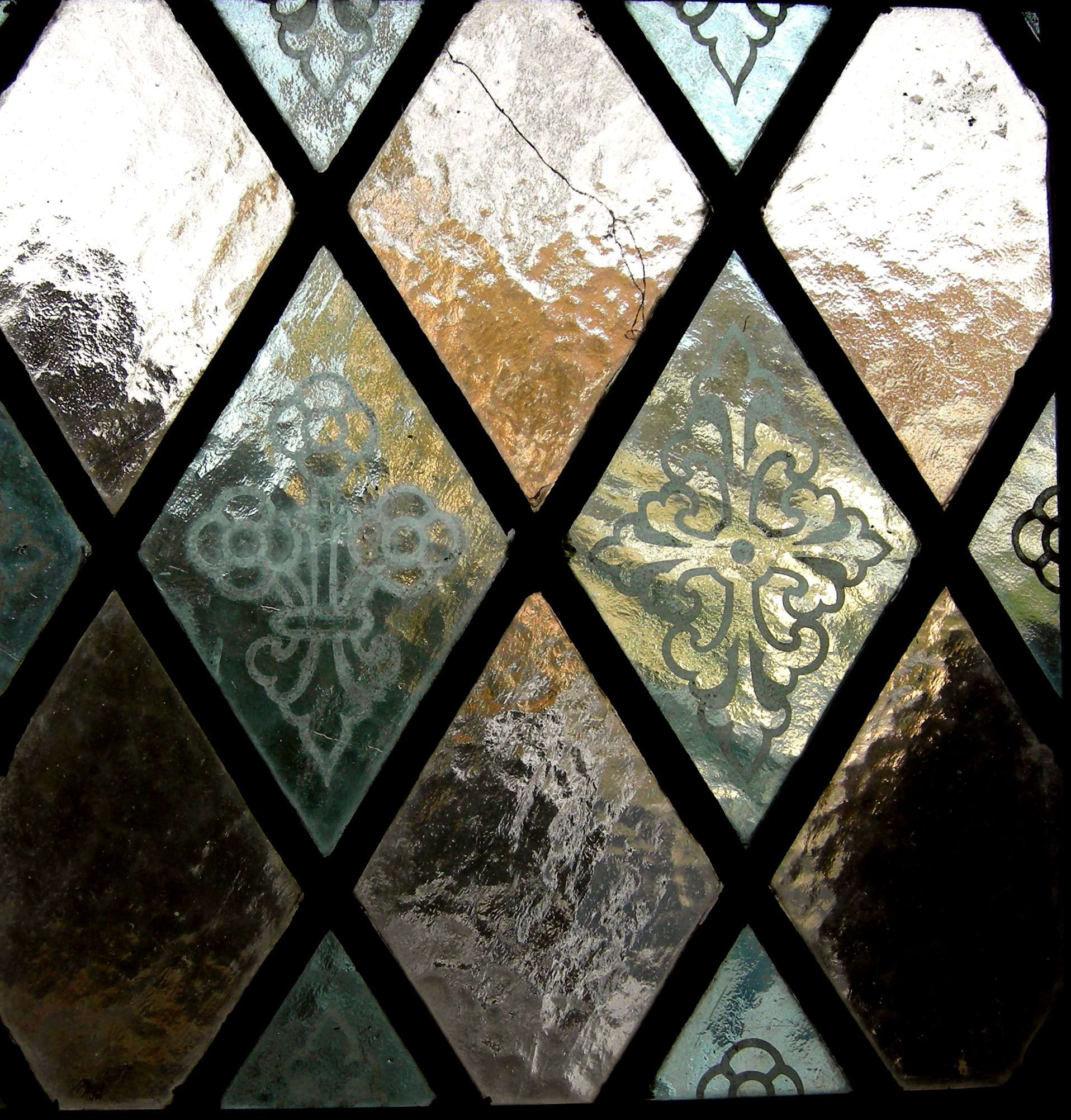
Stencilled cathedral glass in a leadlight window from a chapel

This type of rolled glass is produced by pouring molten glass onto a metal or graphite table and immediately rolling it into a sheet using a large metal cylinder, similar to rolling out a pie crust. The rolling can be done by hand or machine. Glass can be 'double rolled', which means it is passed through two cylinders at once to yield glass of a certain thickness (approximately 3/16" or 5 mm). Glass made this way is never fully transparent, but it does not necessarily have much texture. It can be pushed and tugged while molten to achieve certain effects. For more distinct textures, the metal cylinder is imprinted with a pattern that is pressed into the molten glass as it passes through the rollers. The glass is then annealed.

Rolled glass was first commercially produced around the 1830s and is widely used today. It is often called cathedral glass, but this has nothing to do with medieval cathedrals, where the glass used was hand-blown.

Cathedral glass comes in a wide variety of colours and surface textures including hammered, rippled, seedy, and marine textures. It is made in the US, England, Germany, and China.

== Uses ==
Cathedral glass has been used extensively in churches (often for non-pictorial windows) and for decorative glass in domestic and commercial buildings, both leaded and not, often in conjunction with drawn sheet glass and sometimes with decorative sections of beveled glass. It lets in light while reducing visibility and is a less expensive but still decorative material. While it does not have the richness and versatility of hand-blown glass, it has been used successfully for the creation of modern stained-glass windows in which the texture of the glass is treated, with the colour, as a significant design element.

== Gallery ==
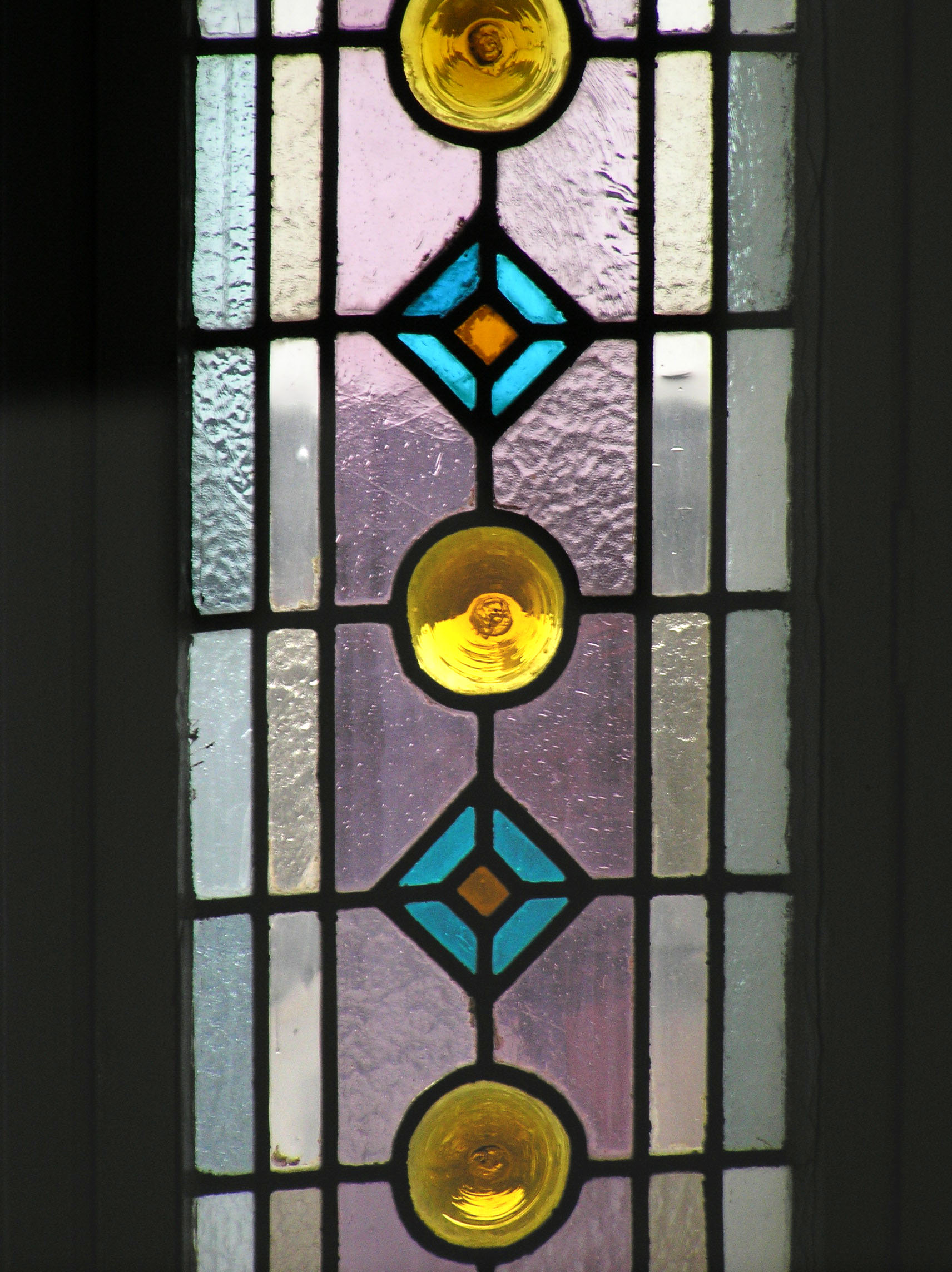
19th-century domestic leadlight with cathedral glass and bull's eyes.

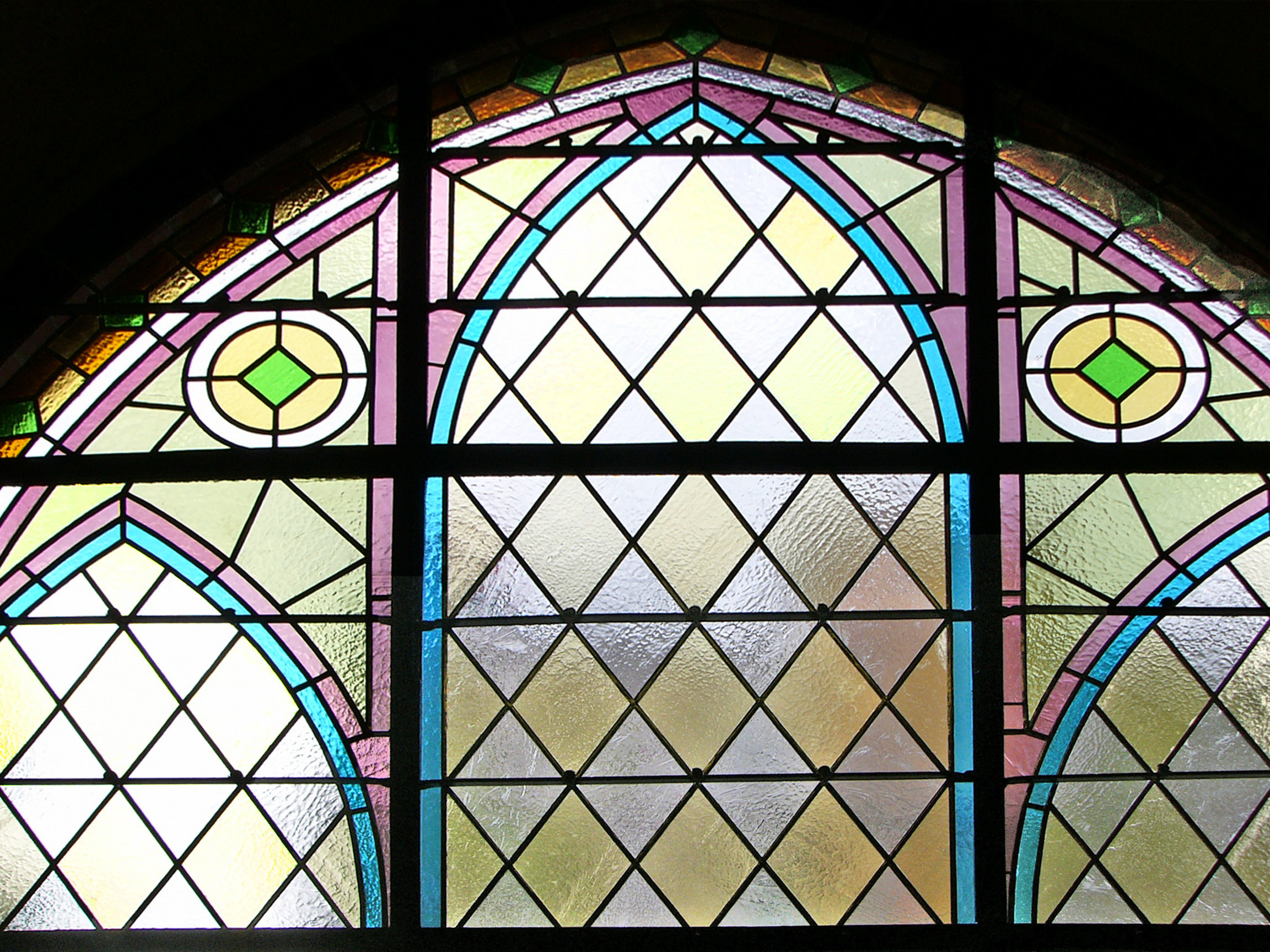
Church window with pale colours typical of early 20th century, Czechoslovakia.

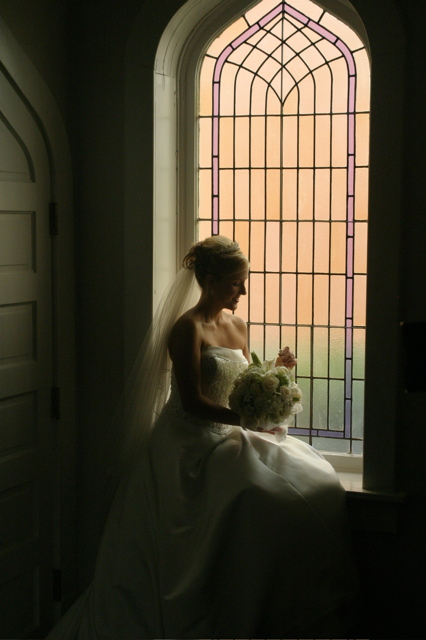
Bride sitting in front of a window of cathedral glass. Photo, Nils Fretwurst, 2005.

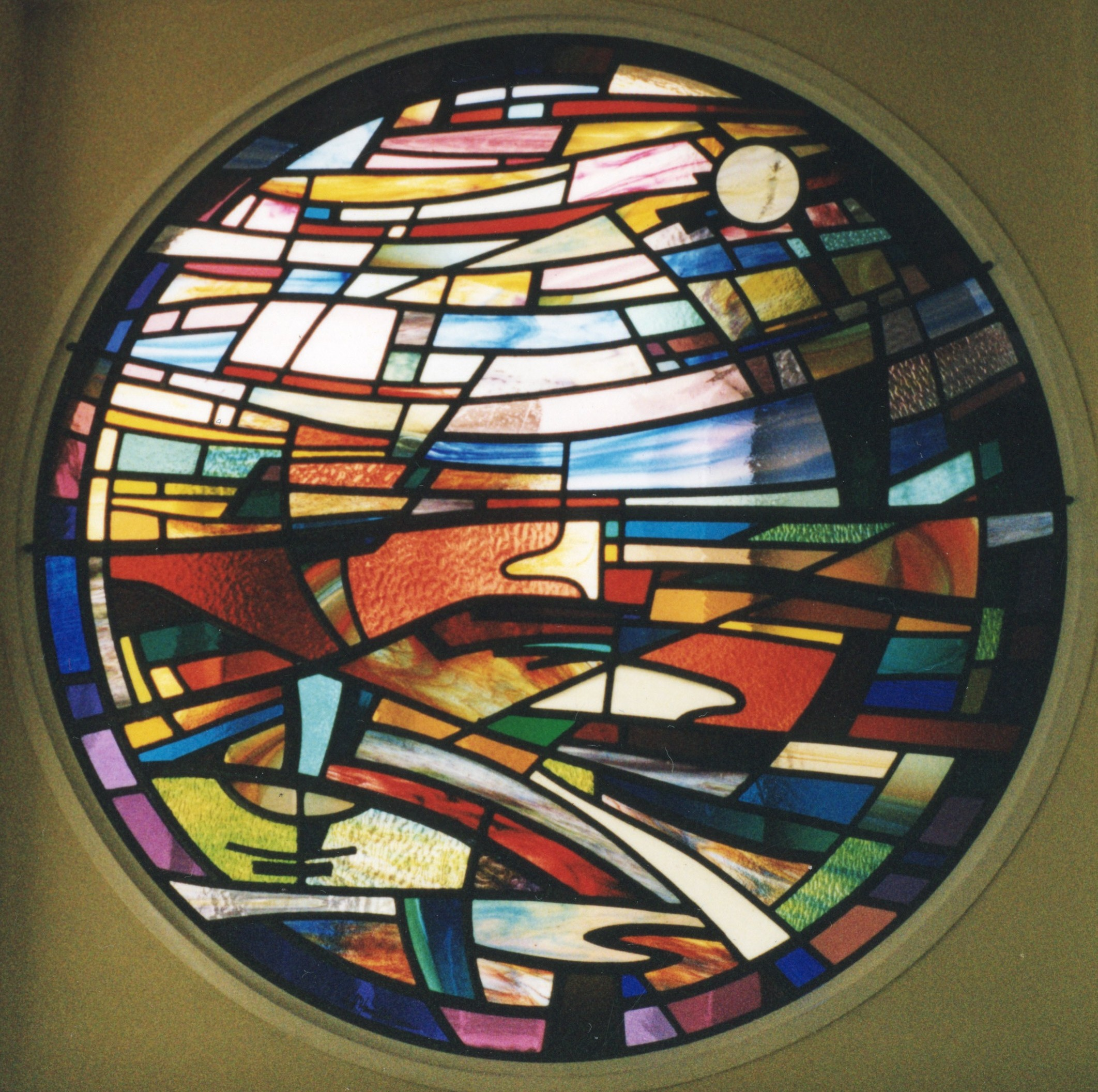
Cathedral glass in contrast with other types of glass. 'Dreamscape' by Jeffrey Hamilton, 2010 (by permission).
