= Angel gilding =

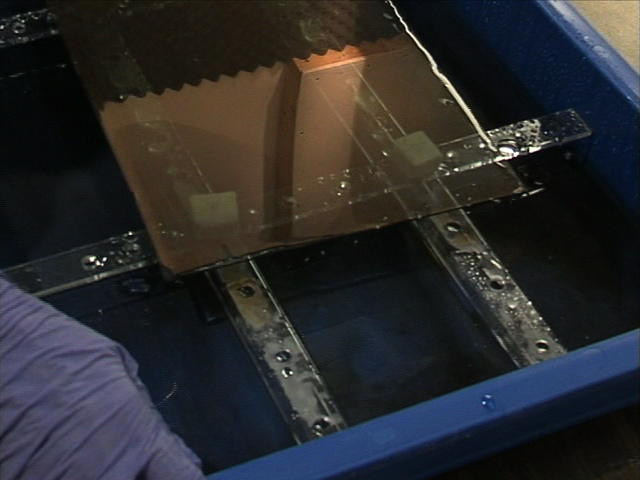
Still from the instructional video "Creating a Mirror on Glass: Silver & Gold"

Angel gilding is gilding glass or gold plating by electroless chemical deposition.

Gold chloride is dissolved in water, mixed with other chemicals and poured on clean glass that has been treated with stannous chloride. The gold layer is delicate and usually translucent. To make an opaque, affordable and adherent mirror, a layer of silver is deposited over the gold. Glass gilders use the term angel gilding to distinguish the chemical process from gold leaf gilding also known as verre églomisé.

== History ==
Justus von Liebig, widely credited with inventing the modern process for silvering glass, also worked on gilding glass with gold chloride. James Pratt, a British glass worker, was the first to realize that he could make affordable gold mirrors by depositing a layer of silver on top of the gold. He was granted a British patent in 1885. Gold mirrors and gold mirrored signs were very popular in English public houses (pubs) in the late Victorian era and many wonderful examples of the art can be found all over Britain today. Felix Andres, a sign painter in San Francisco, introduced a process for spray gilding glass in 1923, but the fashion for elaborate detail in signs was changing to the modern neon style and his business was not successful.

=== Stained glass in Chicago ===
Angel gilding was widely used by Chicago's stained glass studios in the 1920s and 30s to make a distinctive style of stained glass for Chicago's historic bungalows. These Prairie Style windows have a clear glass background with the designs picked out in opalescent glass and double-sided gold mirror. To make the double-sided gold mirror the studios angel gilded large sheets of thin (1.6 mm, or 0.06 inch) glass. A worker would cut two copies of the desired shape from the glass and place the pieces back to back in a single came. Because the pieces are gold on both sides, they catch and reflect the light whether the window is viewed from inside the house or from the street. Frank Lloyd Wright used double-sided angel gilded glass in many of his windows, including the now demolished Imperial Hotel in Tokyo.

=== Today ===
Today angel gilding is used to gild inside blown glass sculptures, repair Chicago's stained glass bungalow windows, create new glass signs and replicate and repair Victorian glass signs.
