= Whall =

Whall is a surname. Notable people with the surname include:

- Christopher Whall (1849–1924), British artist
- Veronica Whall (1887–1967), British artist
- W. B. Whall (1847–1917), Master mariner

== See also ==
- Wall (surname)
