= Lilian Josephine Pocock =

English stained-glass artist (1883–1974)

- Born: 6 May 1883; Paddington, Middlesex, England
- Died: 1974 (aged 90–91)
- Education: LCC Central School of Arts and Crafts, Christopher Whall
- Occupation: Artist
- Known for: Stained glass
- Notable work: Stained glass
- Style: influenced by Christopher Whall, Arts and Crafts movement

Lilian Josephine Pocock (1883–1974) was a stained glass artist who provided stained glass for a number of buildings, including Ulverston Victoria High School, The King's School and Ely Cathedral. She was also a theatrical costume designer, book illustrator and watercolourist. In her later years, failing eyesight prevented her from continuing her work in stained glass. After some years of retirement she died in 1974.

== Early years and studies ==
Lilian Josephine Pocock, born on 6 May 1883 in Paddington in Middlesex, was the daughter of the Victorian artist, Lexden Lewis Pocock (1850–1919) and the sister of Alfred Lyndhurst Pocock (1882-1962) the renowned sculptor, glyptic artist, watercolourist and carver of gemstones for the famous house of Fabergé in the early twentieth century. From the late 1890s to 1906 she attended Royal Academy Schools and then the Regent Street Polytechnic School of Art, which is now the University of Westminster.

In 1906 she enrolled at the London County Council (LCC) Central School of Arts and Crafts and was taught there by Christopher Whall, Karl Parsons and Alfred J. Drury.

== Career ==
In 1910 she left the LCC School and worked for a time as an assistant to Parsons, who at the time was completing a series of windows for the Apse of Cape Town Cathedral. In 1915 she completed her first church window, a two-light window featuring St Christopher and St Nicholas for Little Marlow church in Buckinghamshire. Undoubtedly her most prestigious commission was for the series of windows in Wilton church and Christ Church in Golden Square. She also completed three windows for the chapel at Tonbridge School; a three-light window of 1919 depicting St Denis, a three-light window of 1925 depicting St Christopher and a three-light window of 1936 depicting St Augustine of Canterbury. Christopher Whall had made six windows for the chapel from 1903 to 1909 and Parsons had added another in 1915 so Pocock was in illustrious company. It was after the Second World War that Pocock designed and made windows for St Paul's in Herne Hill (East window-1948-9) and Christ Church in Brondesbury (North Aisle-1950).

== Works ==
=== Wilton Parish Church ===
Wilton Parish Church in Hawick, Scottish Borders was the source of work for Lilian on many occasions in her life. (Note: The following information was attained by sources at the Wilton Parish Church, but the material is unpublished: Pocock completed a series of windows for this church including a four-light East window in the Chancel which depicts events in the life of Jesus; the Nativity, Crucifixion, Resurrection and Ascension. Another window is in the North Transept and depicts Mary and Joseph. Above the Baptismal font and positioned to the left of the Chancel, there is a Pocock window in memory of a lieutenant who died in the First World War which depicts Mary and Joseph presenting the infant Jesus at the Temple, with Simeon and Anna. To the right of the Chancel a window depicts a scene from the resurrection garden and in the South Transept there is a window with Jesus, Paul and Peter, and scenes from their life from the book of Acts, with the Last Supper depicted beneath them. The church also holds a two-light war memorial window in the north aisle area by Pocock which depicts Joshua before Jericho and is entitled "The Consecration of the Warrior" and a second which depicts Abram and Melchizedek and is entitled "The Consecration of Victory". They are part of a memorial to 74 members of the congregation who were killed in the First World War. All their names are listed on a mural tablet placed between the windows. The tablet has a border of Caen stone and was designed by Mr James P.Alison, of Hawick, and executed by Messrs Allan & Sons, Edinburgh. The memorial tablet was unveiled on 25 September 1921 by the Rev. Dr J. Rudge Wilson, and was afterwards dedicated by the Right Rev. Dr McClymont, Moderator of the General Assembly of the Church of Scotland. The plaque is inscribed- TO THE HALLOWED AND GLORIOUS MEMORY OF THE MEN OF THIS CONGREGATION WHO BY THE GRACE OF GOD GAVE THEIR LIVES FOR THEIR COUNTRY IN THE GREAT WAR THESE WINDOWS ARE DEDICATED IN HUMBLE GRATITUDE A.D. 1921 — Memorial inscription Underneath is a further inscription of great poignancy- "SO HE PASSED OVER AND ALL THE TRUMPETS SOUNDED FOR HIM ON THE OTHER SIDE".) For instance, within the church hall she completed a stained glass window in 1947.

=== Other works ===
==== Churches and cathedrals ====
- Church of Christ the King in Gordon Square, Inner London: A two-light window was completed in 1931 this depicting Moses and Aaron. The church was damaged during the Second World War but restored in 1946. Pocock completed five windows for this church which was formerly the Catholic Apostolic Church, of which Pocock was a member.
- Ely Cathedral in Ely, Cambridgeshire – 1920: Working through James Powell and Sons, Pocock designed a three-light window in the North Transept East.
- Lockerbie Dryfesdale Church in Lockerbie: Part of the First World War memorial in this church is a Pocock window.
- St Georges Church in Hawick: Pocock designed stained glass windows for this church.
- St John the Baptist in Little Marlow, Buckinghamshire – 1915: Pocock designed and made a two-light window in the North Aisle, which depicts St Christopher and St Nicholas. This was her first commission.
- Teviot & Roberton Parish Church and Church Halls in St George's Lane, Hawick, Scottish Borders – 1929–1946: All the stained glass in this church is by Pocock save for the West window. The church is described as a: "more austere form of Gothic, with a plain interior enhanced by stylish stained-glass windows designed by Lilian J Pocock".
- Ulverston Grammar School in Ulverston, Lancashire: The school’s First World War Memorial window contains the central figure of St George, a cartoon by Pocock.
- Wilton Parish Church Hall in Dickson Street, Hawick, Scottish Borders: In the church hall there is a Pocock window in the Boys Brigade chapel. This depicts a young Jesus saying that He must be about His Father's business and has the Boys Brigade "BB" symbol above it.
- St Mary's Church, Breamore, Hampshire. In the church is a window bearing the signature of the artist, depicting Joan of Arc, with a sword and a red cross on her clothing.

==== Other types of buildings ====
- The King's School in Chester, Cheshire: Again working through James Powell and Sons, Pocock designed a five-light window for the school.
- Queen Alexandra's Hospital Home in Worthing, Sussex – 1946: A single light window was completed for the Chapel of the above home which is part of Gifford House. The window depicts the "Miracles of Healing".

==== Illustrations ====
- Holmes, E. E. (1913). In Praise of Legend. London: A. R. Mowbray and Company.
- Holmes, Ernest Edward. The Message of the Soldiers.
- Hollis, Gertrude. That Land and This.
- Holmes, E. E. And Mary Sings Magnificat - A Christmas Thought. (1915). London: A.R. Mowbray & Co. Ltd.,
