= The Glass House, Fulham =

Purpose-built stained-glass studios in Fulham, London

The Glass House
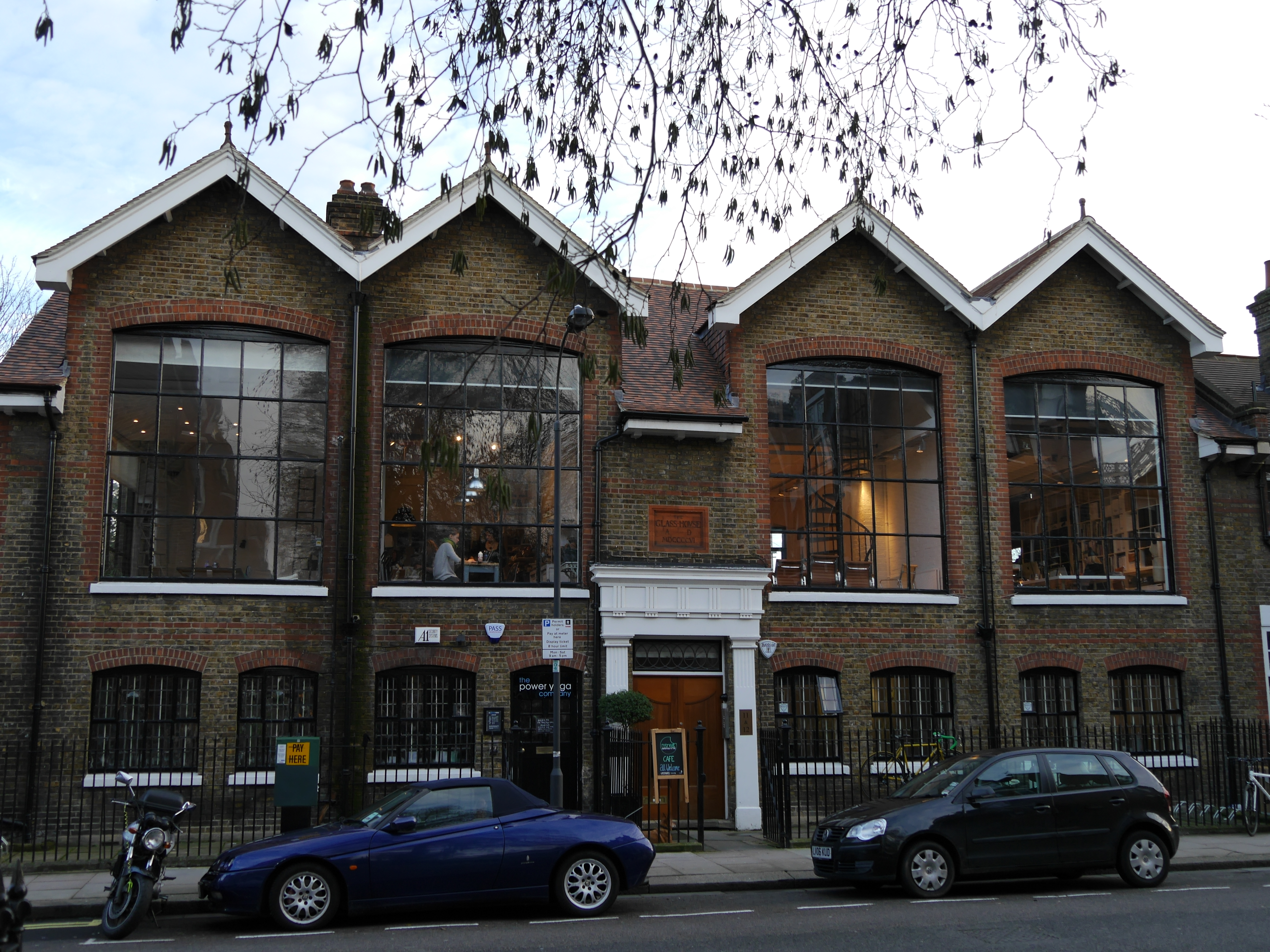

- Location within Greater London

General information
- Location: Fulham, London, England, 9, 10, 11, 12 Lettice Street
- Coordinates: 51.4742°N 0.2044°W
- Completed: 1906

Technical details
- Floor count: 2

Design and construction
- Architect: Charles Henry Bourne Quennell
- Other designers: Christopher Whall, Alfred J. Drury

The Glass House building was a "purpose-built stained-glass studio and workshop" for stained glass artists in Fulham, London. Having gone into partnership in 1897, Mary Lowndes and Alfred Drury had The Glass House built in 1906 for use by independent stained-glass artists.

== History ==
=== Lowndes and Drury ===
The Glass House was established at 9, 10, 11 and 12 Lettice Street in Fulham by Mary Lowndes and A. J. Drury as a stained glass studio in 1906. It is a two-storey building, with paired windows on the ground floor and tall, segmental headed studio windows on the first floor; the lighting was good for stained glass work. Four gabled main bays are found in the building. The exterior is faced with stock brick, the porch is a corniced and pilastered Doric style. The pitched roof is tiled.

Christopher Whall and Alfred Drury designed the building, built in 1906, that became a centre for prominent stained glass artists. The official architect was Charles Henry Bourne Quennell.

Lowndes designed, coloured and created Art Nouveau stained glass works. She trained and encouraged many women stained glass designers and artists, such as Wilhelmina Geddes. The artists could leverage the skills of other artists at the studio and yet obtain their own commissions. Drury particularly focused on the creation of stained glass pieces. Together they commissioned for design, painting and creation projects.

Independent artists who had studios there, or who were otherwise connected, included Edward Liddall Armitage, Hugh Arnold, Robert Anning Bell, Louis Davis, Clare Dawson, Moira Forsyth, Wilhelmina Geddes, Henry Holiday, Mary Lowndes, Rachel de Montmorency, Karl Parsons, Lilian Josephine Pocock, Margaret Agnes Rope, M. E. Aldrich Rope, Arild Rosenkrantz, Theodora Salusbury, Francis Spear, Margaret Thompson (Note: After 1945 Margaret Grace (Peggy) Thompson was Lowndes and Drury's chief designer. Born in London in 1909, she attended the Central School of Arts and Crafts. A few of her works are in St John, Upper Maze Hill in Hastings and in Jevington. She died in 2007.), Martin Travers, and Christopher Whall. Many of the artists had been students of Christopher Whall and were influenced by the Arts and Crafts movement.

The company was established as a limited company in September 1953 following Lowndes and Drury's deaths, Alfred's son Victor continued the operations of the company until his retirement in July 1973. Working at the Glass House during Victor's time were Emily Ford, Charles Knight, Karl Parsons, and Margaret Grace Thomas.

=== Carl Edwards ===
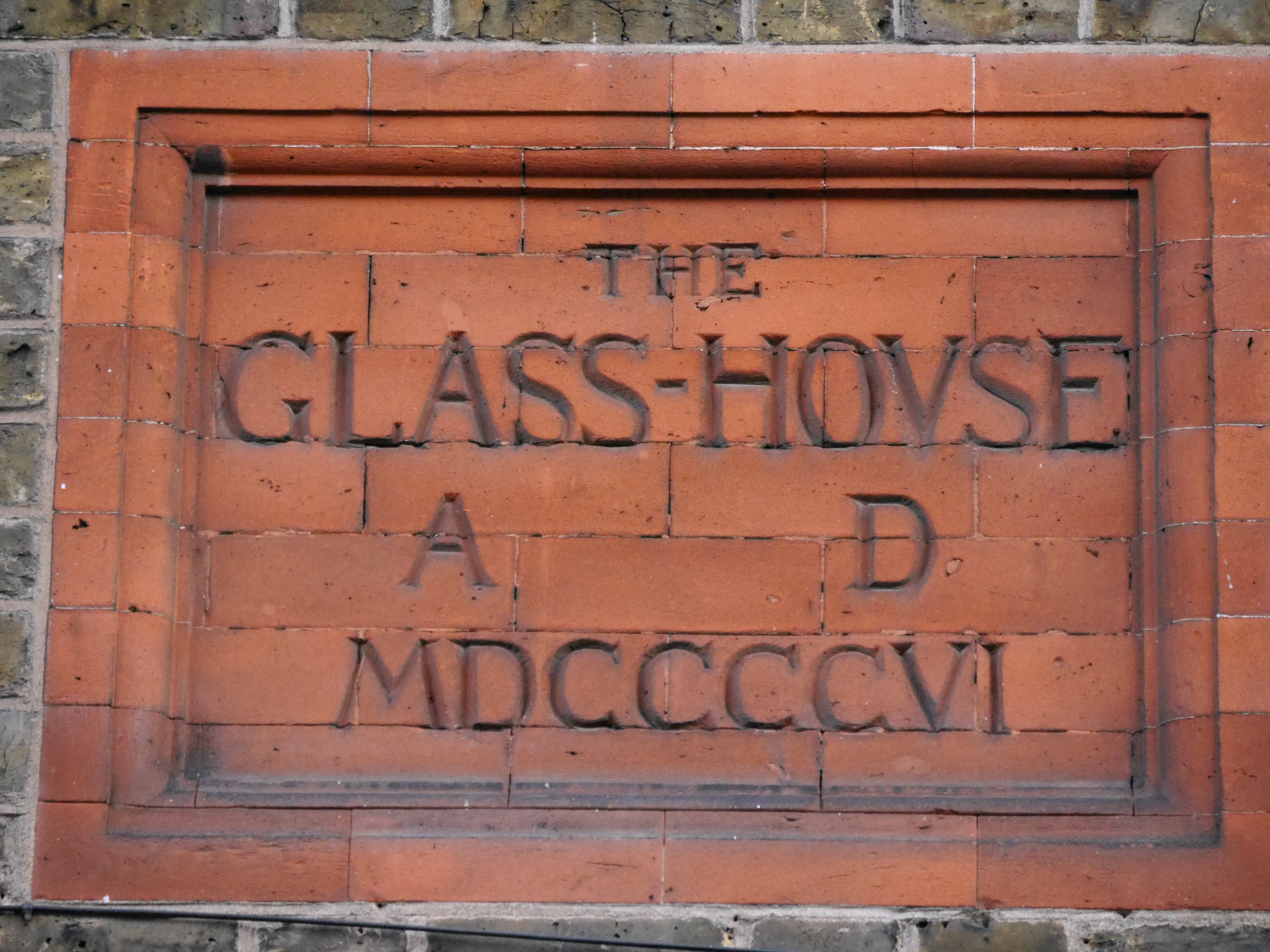
The Glass House, Fulham

Stained-glass artists Carl Johannes Edwards and daughter Caroline Margaret Benyon began working at The Glass House in 1972 or 1973. Artists at the studio at that time included Carl Edwards, Caroline Benyon, Moira Forsyth and Karl Parsons. By the mid-1980s, just a portion of the Glass House was used for stained glass works. After Carl Edwards death, his daughter, Caroline Benyon, continued the business at The Glass House (Note: Caroline Benyon reports that her father's studio moved to the Glass House in 1972, while the Sussex Parish Church reference state that Victor Drury had The Glass House until 1973.) until 1992 when she moved the business to Hampton, London.

=== Recent years ===
The stained glass studio closed in March 1993. The building now houses Power Yoga, Icon Architects, Icon Property Solutions and a fashion company, Sweaty Betty Holdings.

== Gallery ==
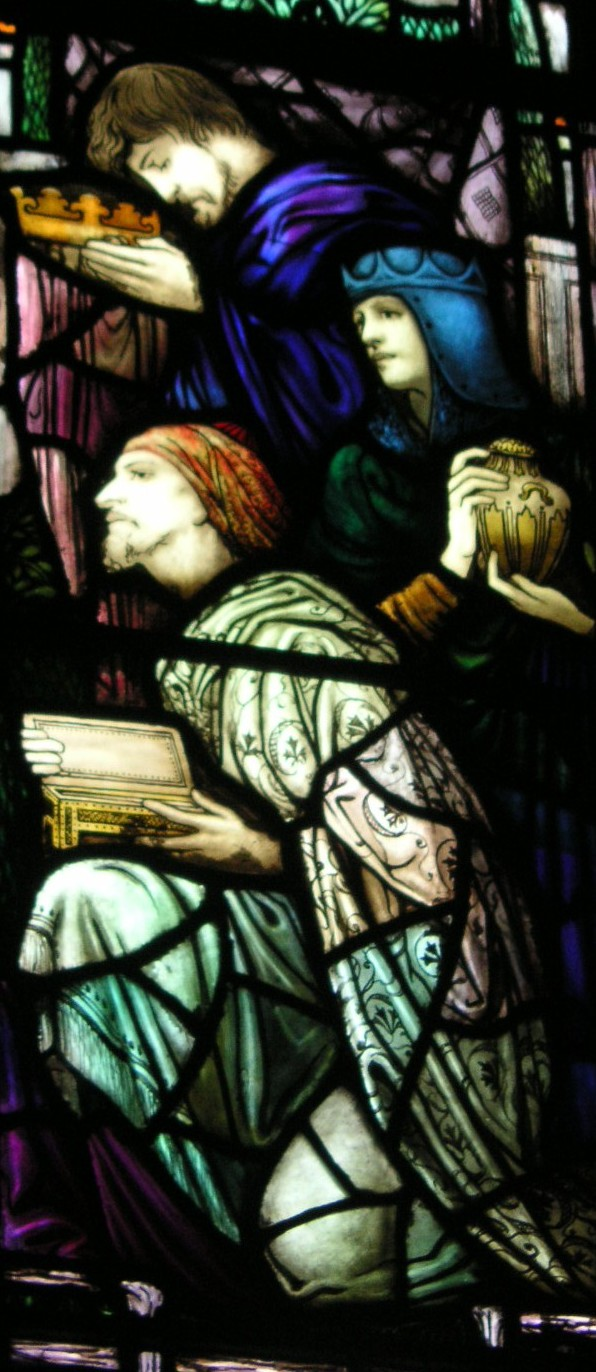
Lowndes & Drury, English stained glass, 1912, in Taplow, Buckinghamshire

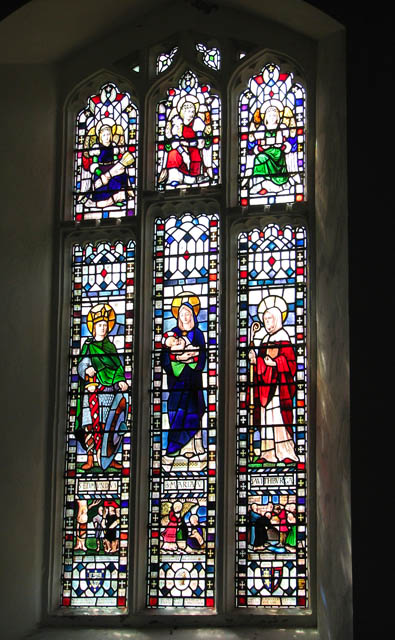
Hugh Arnold, St Mary's Church Nave South Window, 1910, Saxlingham Nethergate

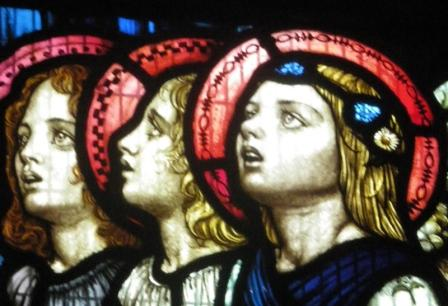
Robert Anning Bell, Gerald Valerian Wilson memorial stained glass window, St James Church, Warter
