= Alfred Drury (disambiguation) =

Alfred Drury was an English architectural sculptor.

Alfred Drury may also refer to:

- Alfred Drury (stained glass artist) (1868–1940), English stained-glass artist
- Charles Alfred Drury (1844–1905), Ontario, Canadian politician
