= W. B. Whall =

British master mariner, musician and writer

William Boultbee Whall (1846 – 1917) was a master mariner, who compiled one of the first collections of English sea songs and shanties in 1910. He joined the Merchant Navy as a boy of 14 and learned the songs during 11 years aboard East Indiamen. In the foreword to his book he wrote that he thought the songs "worthy of preservation". In addition, Whall wrote a number of books about navigation and practical seamanship.

== Early years ==
William Boultbee Whall was born 18 December 1846 and was baptized on 31 January 1847 by his own father Revd William Whall, rector of St James the Great church in the hamlet of Thurning on the border between Northamptonshire and Huntingdonshire. His father, born in Lincoln in 1807, went to Emmanuel College Cambridge and remained as rector of Thurning for over 40 years (1833 till his death in 1874). His mother Mary Elizabeth Boultbee was born in Oxford in 1817, the daughter of Revd Richard Moore Boultbee. William Jr was the eldest of 8 children and was initially "intended for the church, not for the sea". As a young boy, he was a chorister (1854–61) at Magdalen College, Oxford where he happened to receive musical tuition from a young John Stainer. In 1860 Stainer was attached to the choir school as an organist and choirmaster at age 20. Perhaps because his voice broke, Whall left the choir school in 1861 to go to sea.

== Maritime years ==
Although the Royal Navy was revamping its training system at this time following the Pelham Commission of 1856, Whall preferred the Merchant Navy as a career choice and quickly achieved his Second mate certificate in 1867 in London and his First mate certificate in 1869. He became a Master mariner in 1878 and by 1901 was a nautical surveyor with the Board of Trade based at Wallasey on the River Mersey. By the 1911 census Whall, aged 64, was a Principal Officer at the Board of Trade in Barry, Vale of Glamorgan, South Wales, supervising sea vessels in the Bristol Channel.

== Sea Shanty book ==
Nearing retirement, Whall recalled the sea songs of his youth, combining them perhaps with songs from sailors he had met in the Liverpool and Bristol areas in his latter years. At first, he published a selection of songs in the Nautical Magazine and in Yachting Monthly but then resolved to compile them all in a single book, writing: "I set myself a plain task, namely to write down these songs, music, and words, as I heard them sung at sea by sailors." He enrolled the help of his younger brother Roughton Henry Whall (1862–1933), an organist and music teacher (Mus. Bac., FRCO) living in Stroud, Glos as well as his niece Veronica Whall (b1885), the young daughter of another brother Christopher Whall, a stained glass artist in Dorking. Roughton Whall supplied the musical settings and Veronica Whall the illustrations for the book, which came out in 1910 and quickly went through several editions. It contained 50 songs, half of which would find their way into most modern shanty books or repertoires. Whall's book preceded the collection of another genuine seafarer Frank Thomas Bullen (1857–1915). Bullen went to sea in 1869 aged 12 and later became a prolific novelist. At the end of his life, he set out 42 shanties in his interesting book. Whall also preceded the folksong collector Cecil Sharp, who picked up shanties from Somerset singers Henry Rapsey and Henry Bailey in Bridgwater as well as a massive store of songs from John Short ('Yankee Jack') at Watchet. Sharp's book English Folk-Chanteys came out in 1914. Collections of French shanties were made by Captain Armand Hayet in 1927 and American songs by Joanna Carver Colcord in 1924. Many modern scholars, however, still reference Capt Whall's book in their investigations into sea songs and shanties. Richard Runciman Terry in his book The Shanty Book Part One comments that 'of all these collections (of shanties) Capt. Whall's is the only one which a sailor could accept as authoritative'.

Whall also published works under the pseudonym "Alan Oscar", including the work School and Sea Days (1901).

== Books on seamanship ==
Whall used his maritime experience to produce several books on seamanship, notably Practical Seamanship for use in the Merchant Service and Handy Book of the Stars used in Navigation. Whall also commented on the various nautical references in William Shakespeare's writings.

== Personal life ==
Whall's wife Jane was from Sydney, Nova Scotia, Canada and they had two children. Whall died at his home "Thurning" in Barry, Glamprgan on 31 January 1917.
