= Theodora Salusbury =

British artist (1875–1956)

- Born: 24 May 1875; Leicester, Leicestershire, England
- Died: 22 September 1956 (aged 81); Bath, Somerset, England
- Alma mater: Royal College of Art, Central School of Arts and Crafts, Slade School of Fine Art
- Known for: Stained Glass
- Movement: arts and crafts

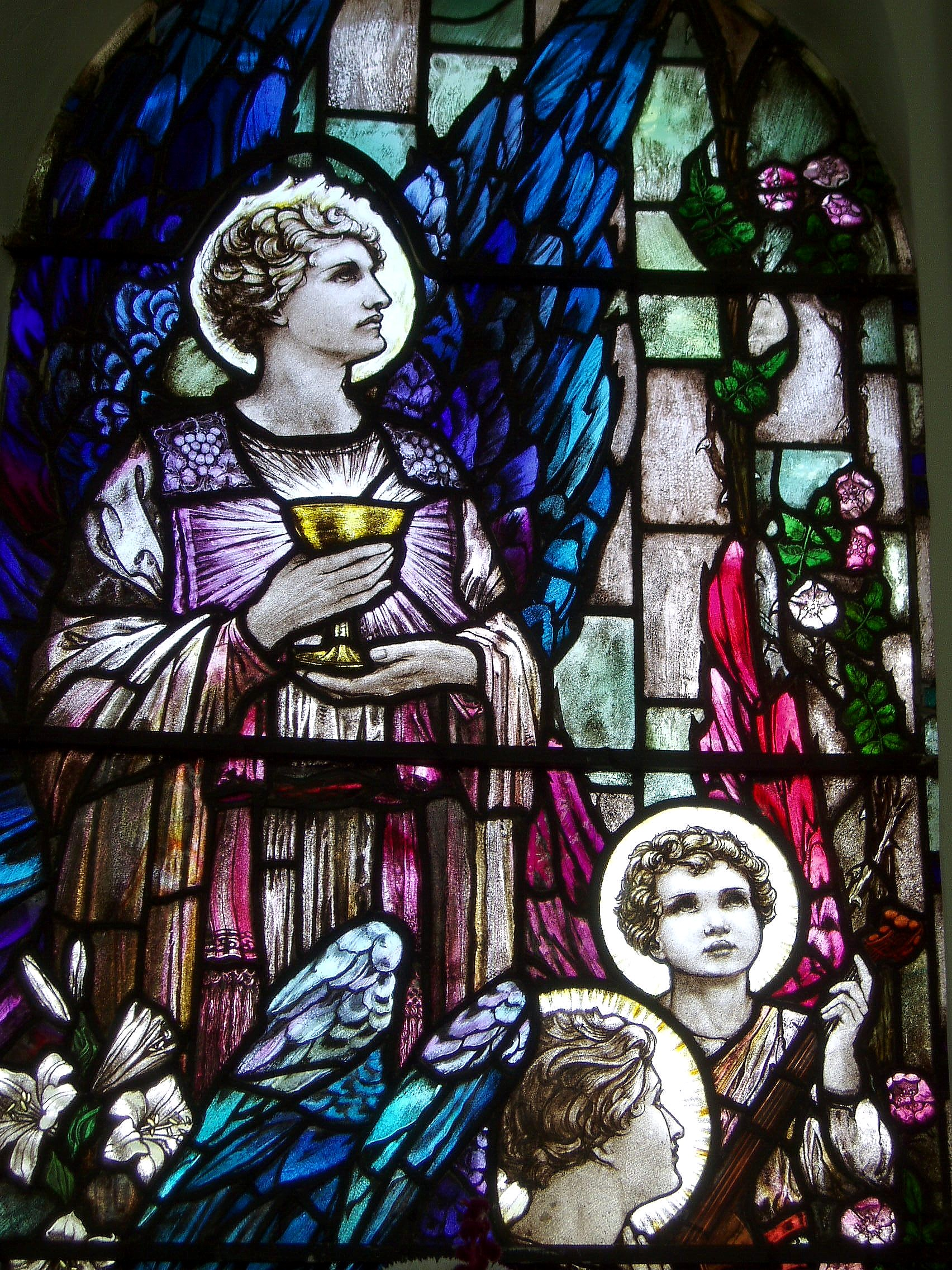
A window by Salusbury in the apse of St John Baptist Church in Honiley, Warwickshire

Theodora Salusbury (24 May 1875 – 22 September 1956) was an artist and craftswoman in the Arts & Crafts-style. She specialised in stained glass and most of her work bears her signature, a peacock in its pride.

== Biography ==
Salusbury was born on 24 May 1875 in Leicester, Leicestershire. She studied at the Royal College of Art, the Central School of Arts and Crafts and the Slade School of Fine Art in London, training under influential artists including Christopher Whall and Karl Parsons.

After her training, Salusbury worked as a stained glass artist at her studios in Cornwall and London. Her studio was the second professional stained glass studio established in Cornwall. She had moved to St Agnes in the early 1920s.

Salusbury's windows would be leaded up by Lowndes & Drury. Dating mostly from between the two World Wars, the windows were destined for nearly thirty churches in England and Wales, several of them in Leicestershire, Salusbury's home county. She also undertook some domestic commissions.

The impact of Salusbury's windows comes through her use of colour and her representation of the figures she portrayed. Most of her work bears her signature, a peacock in its pride, which is a symbol of the resurrection. This led to her being nicknamed "The Peacock Lady."

Salusbury died on 22 September 1956 in Bath, Somerset, aged 81. She was buried in the churchyard at St. Mary The Virgin in Bathwick, Bath, Somerset.

== Selected works ==
- St John Baptist Church in Honiley, Warwickshire, England.
- "Adoration of the Magi" at St Peter’s Church, Monmouthshire, Wales.
- "Adoration of the infant Jesus by the Blessed Virgin Mary" at St Thomas of Canterbury at Camelford, Cornwall, England.

== Legacy ==
In 2018, the book Theodora Salusbury, Stained Glass Artist 1875–1956 by Georgina Maltby and Andrew Loutit was published by the British Society of Master Glass Makers.

Leicestershire County Council approved a nomination for Salusbury to be commemorated through their Green Plaques scheme, as nominated by a member of the public. The plaque was unveiled at St. James the Great Church in Birstal, Leicestershire, during December 2022.

== Other sources ==
- McWhirr, A. (1999). Century to millennium: St James the Greater, Leicester, 1899–1999. Leicester: PCC of St James the Greater.
