= Edward Liddall Armitage =

English stained-glass designer (1887–1967)

- Born: 1887
- Died: 1967 (aged 79–80)
- Known for: Stained glass artist

Edward Liddall Armitage or E. Liddall Armitage (1887–1967) was an English stained-glass designer. He studied and worked with Karl Parsons and Henry Holiday before going into partnership with Victor Drury. In the 1940s to the early 1960s, Armitage was the chief stained glass designer for James Powell and Sons. During his career he designed and made stained glass works for churches and cathedrals. He also published a book on making stained glass.

== Education and career ==
Armitage studied under Karl Parsons and from 1920 to 1924 was his assistant stained glass painter. He also studied under Henry Holiday. After Holiday died in 1927, Armitage finished some of Holiday's work that was in progress. Like Holiday and Parsons, Armitage worked at The Glass House (Fulham).

He was a partner to Victor Drury of Lowndes and Drury of The Glass House (Fulham) studio in the 1920s. Starting in 1930, Armitage worked as a stained glass artist at 43-45 Blenheim Crescent in North Kensington in London. He joined James Powell and Sons, Whitefriars Ltd in 1950.

He published a book title Stained glass: history, technology and practice.

== Works ==
The partial list of Armitage's works are sorted by church name:

=== England ===
- St. Peter's Church, Chailey, East Sussex
- St. Mark's Church, Bromley, Greater London (showing the spreading of the gospel)
- St. George's Headstone, Harrow, Greater London
- Church of St. Peter, Bittering, Norfolk
- St. Peter's Church, Slinfold, West Sussex
- St. Andrew's Church, West Dean, West Sussex
- St. Nicholas' Church, West Itchenor, West Sussex
- St. Bartholomew's Church, Marsden, West Yorkshire

=== New Zealand ===
- St. Paul's Cathedral, Wellington, Wellington Region (Air Force windows)

=== United States ===
- Saint Thomas Church, Manhattan, New York State

=== Wales ===
- Church of St. Mary, Swansea, Glamorgan (depiction of Moses and King David, Christ with the Four Evangelists and Scenes from the Life of Saint Mary, c.1958-59)
- St. Brynach's Church, Nevern, Pembrokeshire (depiction of Virgin and Child, c.1940)

== Publications ==
- Edward Liddall Armitage. (1959). Stained glass: history, technology and practice. C. T. Branford Company.
