= Veronica Whall =

British stained glass artist and painter

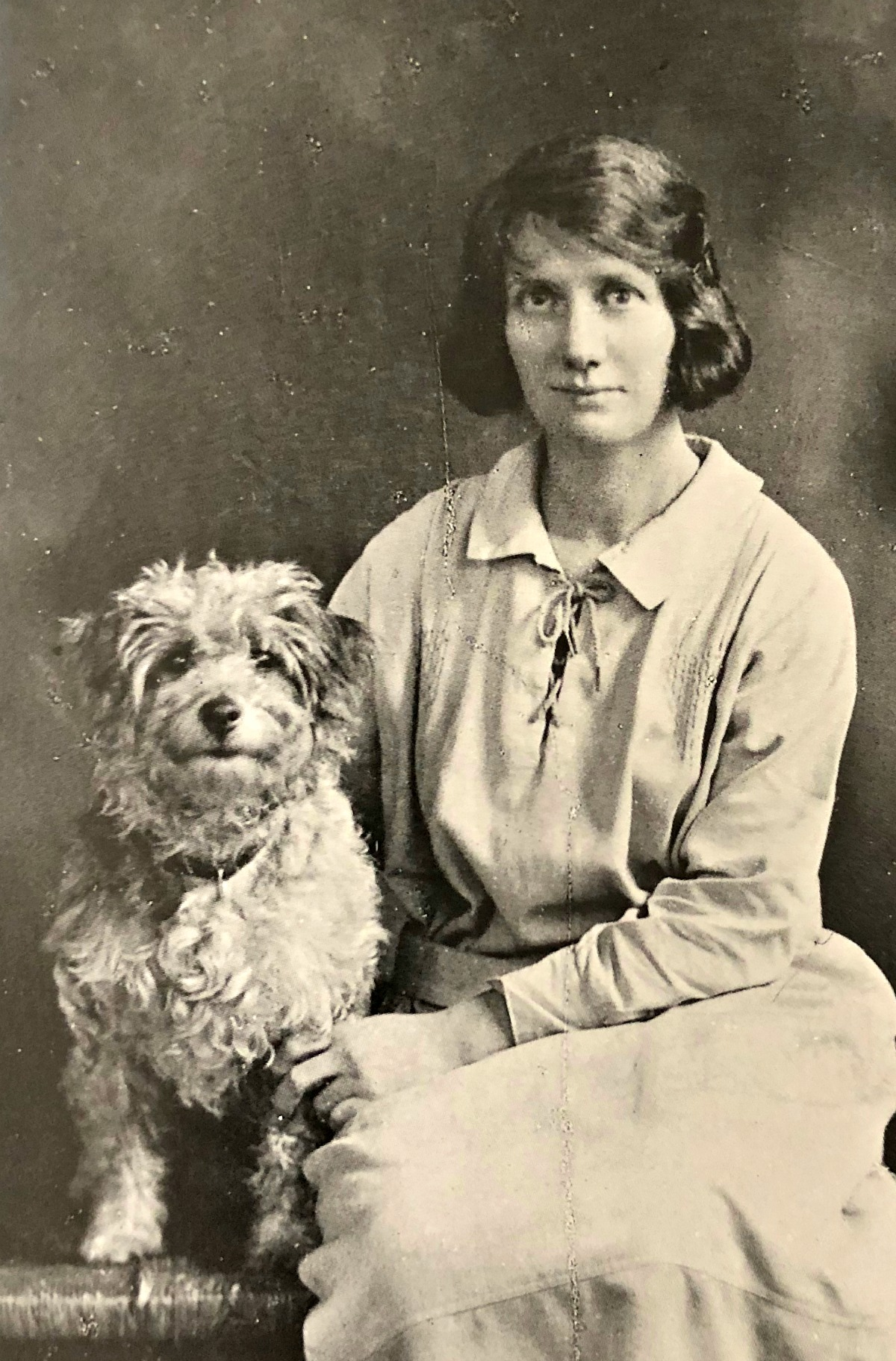
- Veronica Whall, 1915
- Born: 1887; Stonebridge, Surrey, England
- Died: 1967; Cambridge
- Education: L.C.C. Central School of Arts and Crafts
- Movement: Arts and Crafts

Veronica Mary Whall (1887–1967) was an important British stained glass artist, painter, and illustrator associated with the Arts and Crafts movement. Her father, Christopher Whall, was the leader of the movement in stained glass. She was educated in the techniques of painting and stained glass making in her father's studio-workshop. She later became his studio assistant and designer for his studio in 1914. In 1922, Whall and her father co-founded a stained glass studio together, which she managed for nearly thirty years after his death in 1924.

== Early life and education ==
Veronica Whall was born in 1887 in Stonebridge, near Dorking, Surrey. She showed artistic talent at a very young age and was only 13 when she drew Saint Catherine as part of a window for the Lady Chapel of Gloucester Cathedral. (Note: Christopher Whall's work at Gloucester Cathedral was considered among the best of his career.) Whall, her mother, and her siblings were often used by her father as models for his stained glass designs.

Whall attended the L.C.C. Central School of Arts and Crafts, including classes taught by her father. Like other talented students at the school, Whall worked as a student apprentice at her father's studio-workshop.

== Career ==
Whall was employed by her father, Christopher Whall as a studio assistant after she graduated from the Central School of Arts and Crafts. She and other assistants worked with Christoper Whall in completing the many stained glass commissions that Whall's studio-workshop created. In addition to the successful career as a stained glass artist, she also painted. One of her works, The Elf Hour, was a Victorian fairy watercolour painting. In 1907 it was exhibited during the summer at the New Gallery in London.

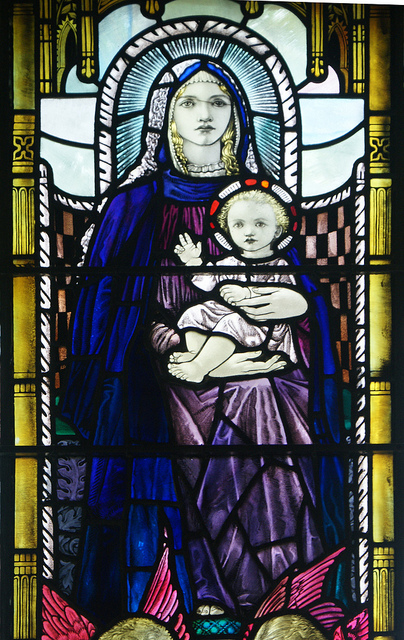
St John the Baptist window, Westfield parish church, East Sussex, 1933

In the 1911 census, Whall gave her occupation as a self-employed "Artist in water colour". In 1912 she illustrated and coloured by hand a limited edition book for John Lyly entitled Cupid & Campaspe. She also wrote, illustrated and coloured by hand her own book, The Story of Peterkin in the Wood, which was printed by her brother Hew B. Whall in 1912. (Note: She is said to have run the small private printing press, the Stonebridge Press, with her brother Bernard.) (Note: Stonebridge Press was used to print some of Christopher Whall and Whall & Whall publications.) She exhibited some of her works at the 1914 Decorative Arts exhibition in Paris.

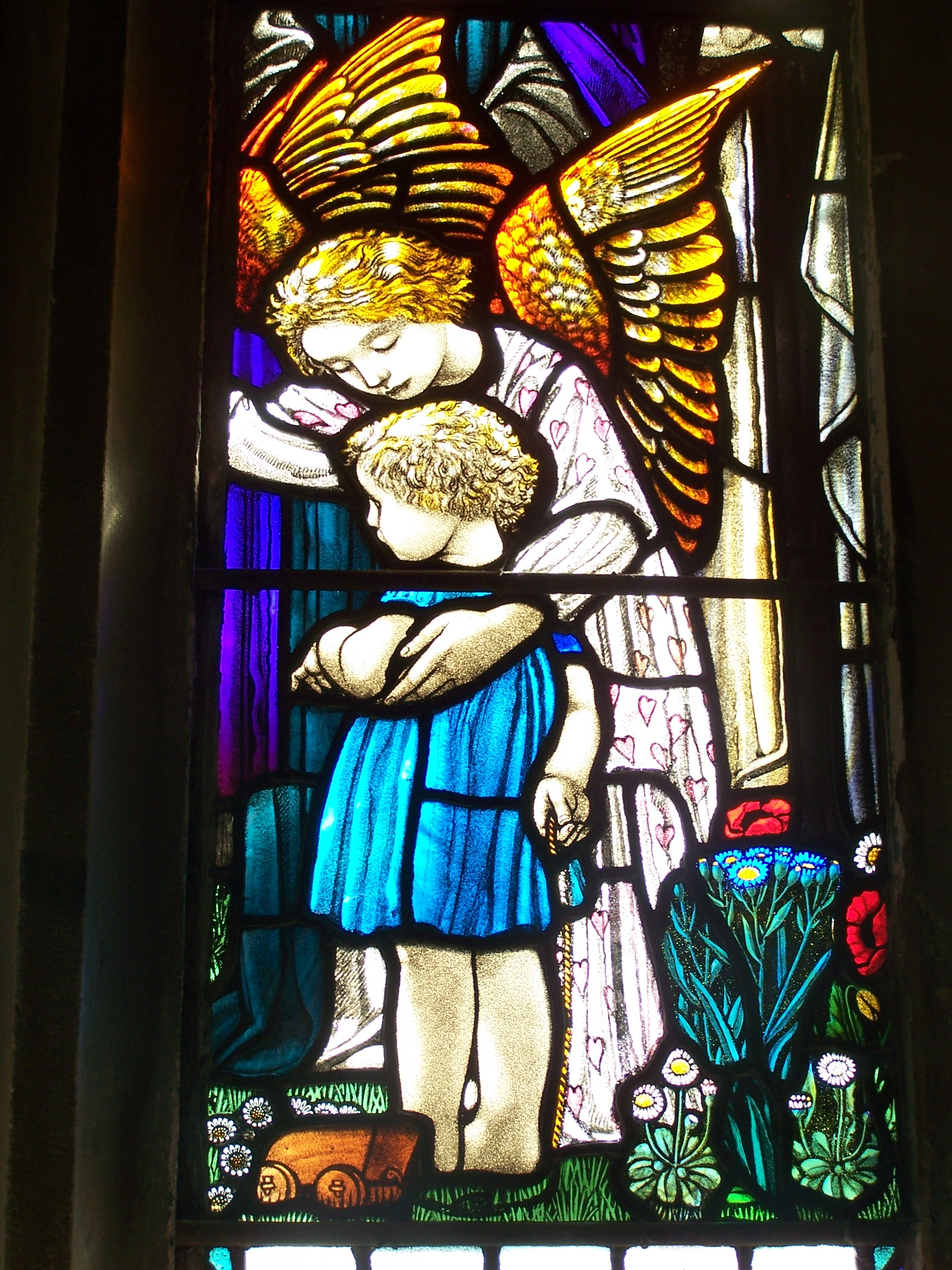
Keswick, Cumbria, 1923

Like her father, she collaborated with Charles Sydney Spooner, who taught at the Central School of Art. In 1916, Spooner led the team who worked on the Apsidal Chapel created for display at the Arts and Crafts Exhibition Society 11th Exhibition, October–November 1916 at the Royal Academy of Arts. Whall and her father worked on the chapel's frieze. She was promoted to designer in her father's studio in 1914, and worked as designer until 1918.

In 1922, Whall and her father opened a studio together which they both co-directed. When Christopher Whall died in 1924, Whall managed the studio, assisted by her brother Christopher, until the studio closed in 1953. Whall & Whall, during its time, completed numerous stained glass works for cathedrals in England, Australia and New Zealand.

In 1953, Whall moved to Huntingdonshire, devoting much of her time to goat-keeping. She died in 1967.

== Stained glass works ==
The three things technically essential to the making of a stained glass window are glass, lead and light... for lead is our medium, and light is our colour.

— Veronica Whall

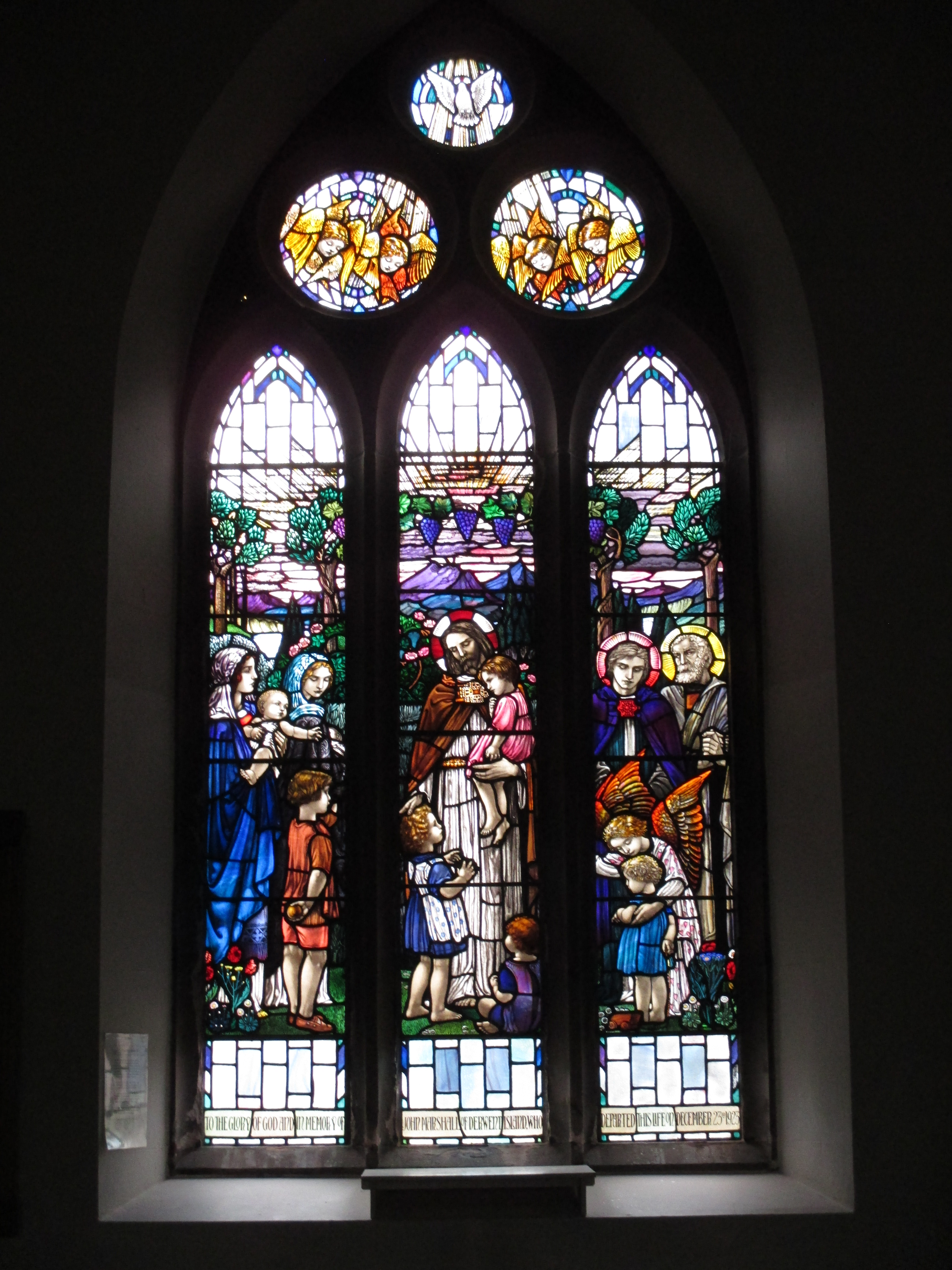
St John's, Keswick, Cumbria

Whall was a prominent and well respected stained glass artist during her career. She completed many stained glass commissions during her lifetime, initially working for Christopher Whall's studio workshop and later at the Whall & Whall studio. Many of her works outside the United Kingdom are to be found in New Zealand, such as those at the Christchurch Nurses' Memorial Chapel, Commissioned by Joseph Davis, Whall made for Whalley Methodist Church, St. Francis of Assisi and The Madonna and Child windows. These windows are said to be among her best works.

She created 73 windows for King Arthur's Hall, Tintagel, Cornwall, that opened in 1933. As of 1997 it is considered to be the largest collection of stained glass panels of King Arthur made in the 20th century and a great example of Arts and Crafts workmanship. (Note: King Arthur author Mike Ashley states that there were 72 panels made.)

== See also ==
- Christopher Whall
- Mary Lowndes
- Wilhelmina Geddes
- Margaret Redmond
- Arts and Crafts movement
