= Mary Lowndes =

British stained-glass artist and suffragette (1857–1929)

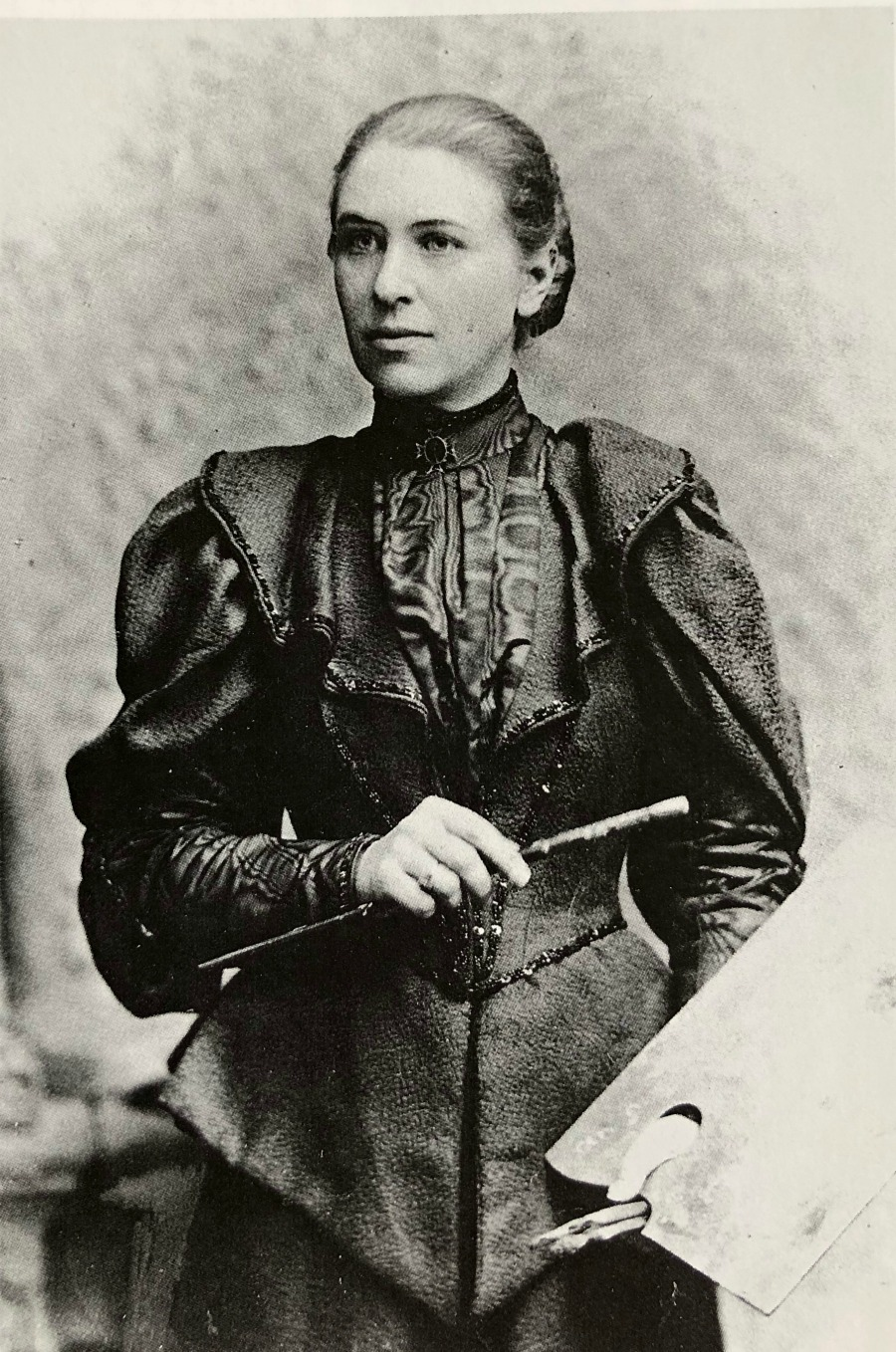
- Mary Lowndes, 1890
- Born: 1857; Dorset, England
- Died: 1929 (aged 71–72); Buxted, East Sussex, England
- Education: Slade School of Fine Art
- Movement: Arts and Crafts Movement

Mary Lowndes (1857–1929) was a British stained-glass artist who co-founded the stained glass studio and workshop Lowndes and Drury in 1897. She was an influential leader in the Arts and Crafts movement, not only for her stained glass work and successful studio-workshop, but also for opening doors for other women stained glass artists. She was an active participant in the suffragette movement, acting as Chair of the Artists' Suffrage League, and creating poster art to assist the movement.

== Early life and work ==
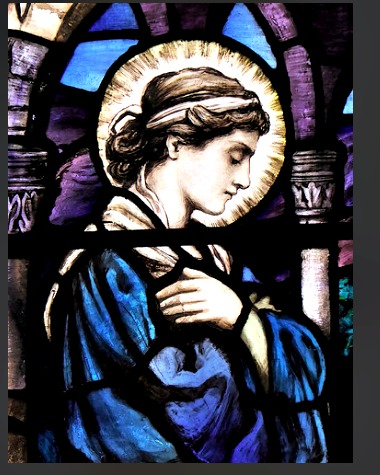
St Andrew, Meonstoke, Hampshire, 1906

She was born in 1857, the daughter of Richard Lowndes, the rector of St Mary's Church, Sturminster Newton in Dorset, and his wife Annie Harriet Kaye. She received her art training at the Slade School of Fine Art in London. When Lowndes completed her art classes, she became an assistant to prominent stained glass designer, Henry Holiday. She worked at his studio-workshop where she drew cartoons (designs) for stained glass commissions. While working for Holiday, Lowndes taught herself the techniques of stained glass. The first window she painted was a two-light window titled "Feed my sheep", completed in 1893 for St Peter's church, Hinton St Mary, Dorset.

Lowndes lived and worked in Chelsea, where she had her own studio to work on designs, but there was no workshop nearby to complete her stained glass work. She would travel to Southwark, to the Britten and Gilson studio-workshop, where she would select the coloured glass for her commissions, paint the glass and supervise the firing and glazing of the windows. Lowndes worked as a stained glass designer for James Powell & Sons from 1887 to 1892.

Lowndes was one of the first women to work professionally in stained glass in the 1890s. "Women, generally amateurs, might occasionally design windows and even take some part in their execution, but they rarely if ever practiced the whole art independently as a full time professional occupation".

== Lowndes and Drury ==
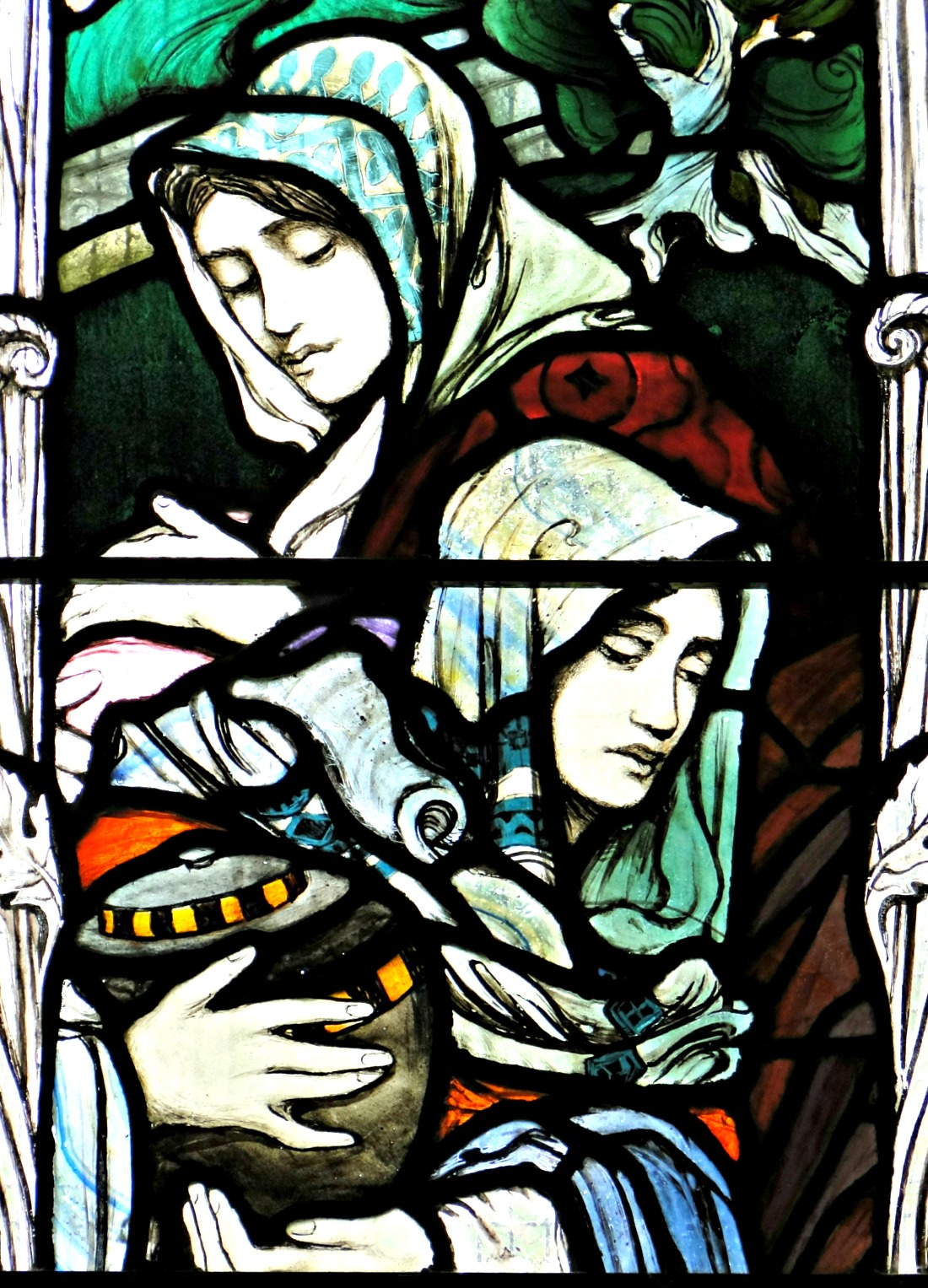
Sturminster Newton, Dorset, (1906)

While working at the Britten and Gilson workshop, Lowndes met renowned stained glass artist Christopher Whall. Lowndes admired his innovative stained glass, and her early work shows his artistic influence. In 1897, with the encouragement of Whall, Lowndes established her own studio-workshop with Alfred J. Drury. Drury was the foreman at the Britten and Gilson workshop, and co-instructor of stained glass with Whall at the Central School of Arts and Crafts.

The new studio-workshop in Chelsea was named Lowndes and Drury. The venture developed out of Lowndes and Drury's shared experience of working for a big studio, and they created their new enterprise to meet the needs of the new school of independent artists associated with the emerging Arts and Crafts movement. The studio-workshop would provide the technical facilities to allow artists to work on all stages of their stained glass commissions, from design to glass selection, painting and glazing.

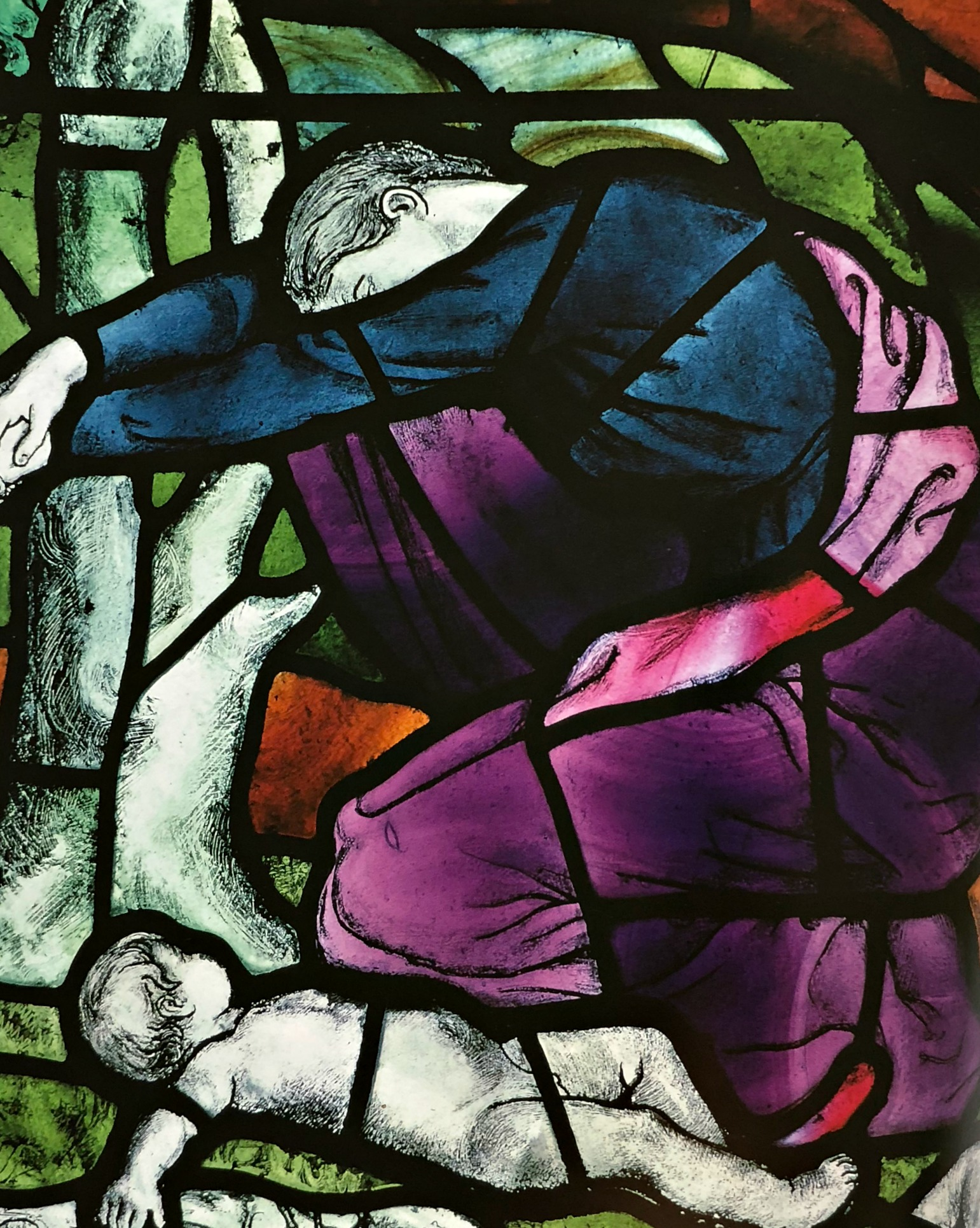
Holy Innocents Church, Lamarsh, Essex (1896)

The partnership was established with an initial investment of £30 from each partner. Lowndes also provided a £200 loan and additional loans of £280 came from Lowndes's companion, Barbara Forbes, her aunt, Miss Alice Vivian Kaye and friend, Miss J.F. Pearson. Along with Drury's small investment, the new firm was financed in its early years by these four women.

Lowndes managed the new business with Drury, but chose not to be chief designer of the workshop. Like other workshop clients, she primarily used the facilities to work on her own stained glass commissions. Her stained glass was highly regarded and in great demand at the time, and her work can be seen in parish churches throughout England and Wales.

In 1906, with the need for bigger facilities, Lowndes and Drury founded the Glass House in Lettice Street, Fulham. The building at 9, 10, 11 and 12 Lettice Street was established as a stained glass studio for works commissioned by Lowndes and Drury and for use by independent artists. It was a purpose-built stained glass studio and workshop, designed by Christopher Whall and Drury. The Glass House attracted many artists, including Wilhelmina Geddes and Robert Anning Bell. In the early twentieth century, it was considered the most important studio-workshop for stained glass associated with the Arts and Crafts movement.

== Suffragette movement ==
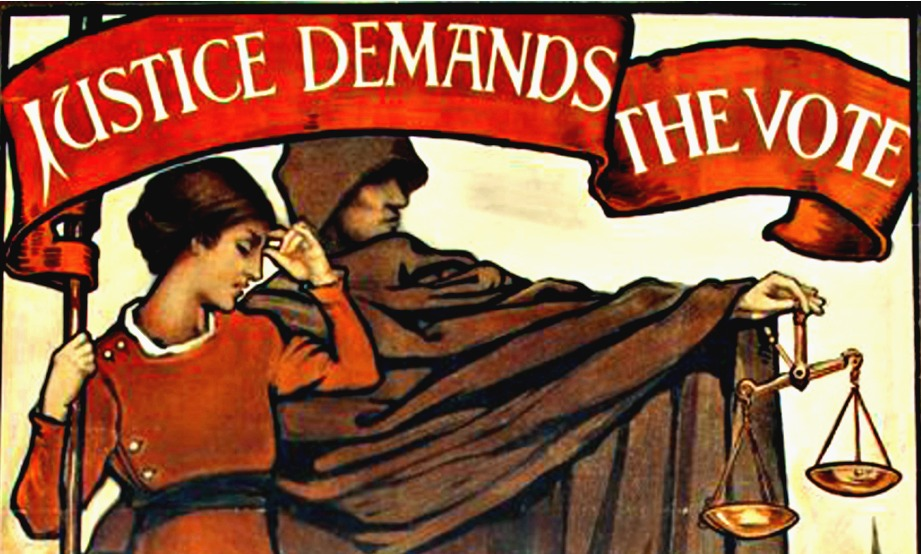
Suffrage poster, 1909

Lowndes became involved in the Women's suffrage movement in the 1890s. In 1899, she attended the International Congress of Women in London. In January 1907, Lowndes established The Artists' Suffrage League (ASL) to create dramatic posters, postcards, Christmas cards, and banners for suffrage events. She became its chair and Barbara Forbes, her companion, was the secretary.

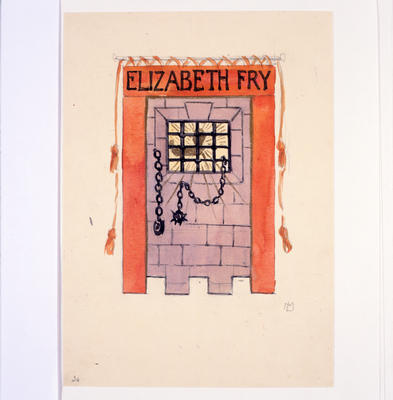
Lowndes' banner celebrating prison reformer Elizabeth Fry

Medicine banner designed by Mary Lowndes for NUWSS march 13 June 1908

Between 1903 and 1914, the methods used by the women's suffrage movement began to change and they began to engage in public demonstrations and other propaganda activities. Lowndes' training as an artist and stained-glass designer encouraged the use of bold shapes and a love of full, rich colours, using striking combinations of green and blue, magenta and orange. She wrote a guide in 1910 to help women create their own Banners and Banner-Making, saying of the suffrage banners: "you do not want to read it, you want to worship it. Choose purple and gold for ambition, red for courage, green for long-cherished hopes ... It is a declaration." Such banners were designed with female images like flowers, lit lamps, shells, sunrays, winged hearts; and to honour female heroines like Boadicea, Elizabeth Fry, Florence Nightingale, Marie Curie, Josephine Butler, Jane Austen, Mary Wollstonecraft, Charlotte Brontë and even 'Victoria, Queen and Mother'. These were carried in their hundreds or thousands in London's Pageant of Great Women 1909, Hyde Park Rally 1910, From Prison to Citizenship 1911, Pilgrimage for Women's Suffrage 1913, and later that year at the grand funeral procession of Emily Wilding Davison, the suffrage movement's martyr who threw herself under the King's horse at the Epsom Derby. An album of Lowndes' original banner designs (detailed on paper in watercolour and often accompanied by fabric swatches) resides at the Women's Library at the London School of Economics.

Lowndes was also personally active in the national Suffragette movement, including her leadership of the National Union of Women's Suffrage Societies executive committee.

She was a member of the committee of the feminist magazine The Englishwoman's Review and contributed regularly to it.

== Personal life ==
Lowndes' lifelong companion was Barbara Forbes, the secretary of the Artists' Suffrage League founded by Lowndes. Throughout her life, Lowndes suffered from chronic asthma.

Lowndes died in 1929 and was buried in Buxted, East Sussex, England. She left Forbes a sum of money, all her pictures, prints, cartoons, studio effects and her shares in The Englishwoman Ltd.

== Selected stained glass work ==
- All Saints' Church, Childwall, Liverpool
- Holy Innocents, Lamarsh, Essex (a scheme of three windows over several years)
- Holy Trinity, Aberaeron, Ceredigion
- St Andrew, Boxford, Berkshire
- St Andrew, Meonstoke, Hampshire
- St Andrew, Ufford, Cambridgeshire (the entire chancel scheme)
- St Christopher, Haslemere, Surrey
- St Hermes' Church, St Erme, Cornwall
- St George's Church, Altrincham, Cheshire
- St John the Baptist, Snape, Suffolk
- St John the Baptist, Wittersham, Kent
- St Leonard's Church, Heston, London
- St Margaret, Mountain Ash, Rhondda Cynon Taff
- St Mark, Ettagh, Offaly, Ireland, now in St Mary, Shinrone, Offaly, Ireland
- St Mark, Marylebone, London
- St Mary, Ewshot, Hampshire
- St Mary, Linton, Cambridgeshire
- St Mary's, Bourne Street, Pimlico, London
- St Mary, Spittal, Pembrokeshire
- St Mary's Church, Sturminster Newton, Dorset – two windows
- St Mary, Welwyn, Hertfordshire
- St Mary and St Blaise, Boxgrove, Sussex
- St Peter, Great Cheverell, Wiltshire
- St Peter, Henfield, Sussex
- St Peter, Machynlleth, Powys
- St Peter, Shropham, Norfolk
- St Tydecho, Cemaes, Powys
- Church of St Yeghiche, South Kensington (Armenian), London

== Posthumous recognition ==
Lowndes's name and picture (and those of 58 other women's suffrage supporters) are on the plinth of the statue of Millicent Fawcett in Parliament Square, London, unveiled in 2018.

== Gallery ==
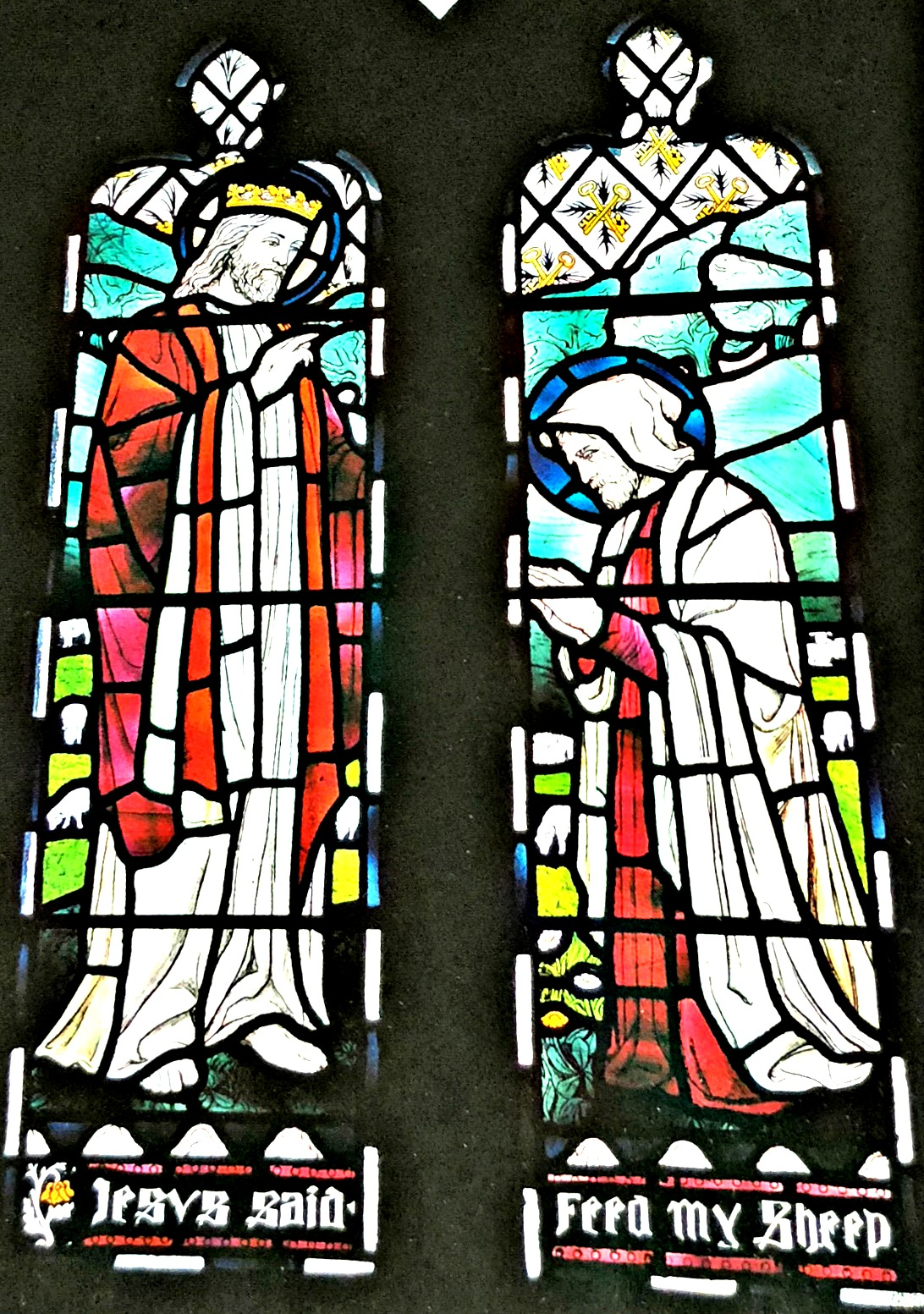
Lowndes's first stained glass window, Hinton St Mary, Dorset (1893)

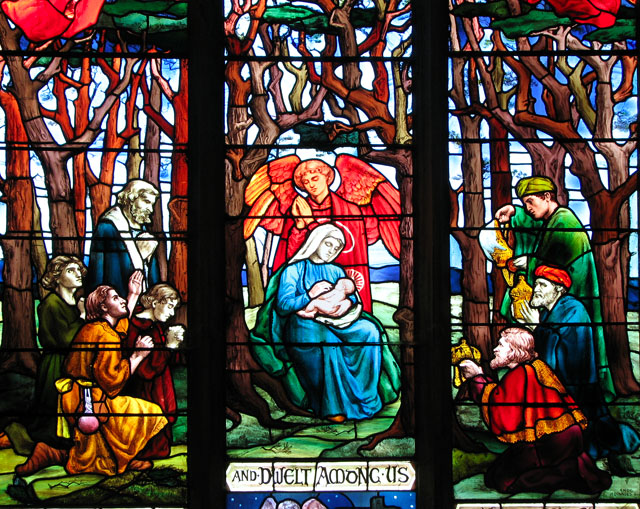
Sts Peter and Paul, Shropham, Norfolk (1898)

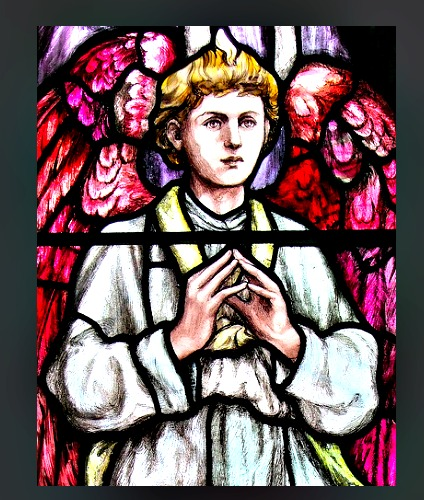
Sts Peter and Paul, Mersea Island, Essex (1905)

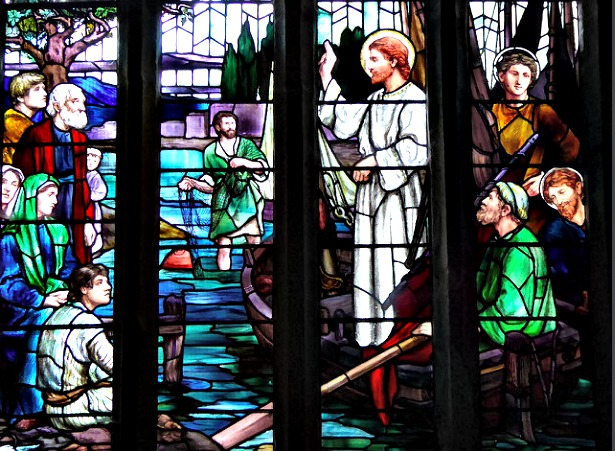
St Erme, Cornwall (1906)

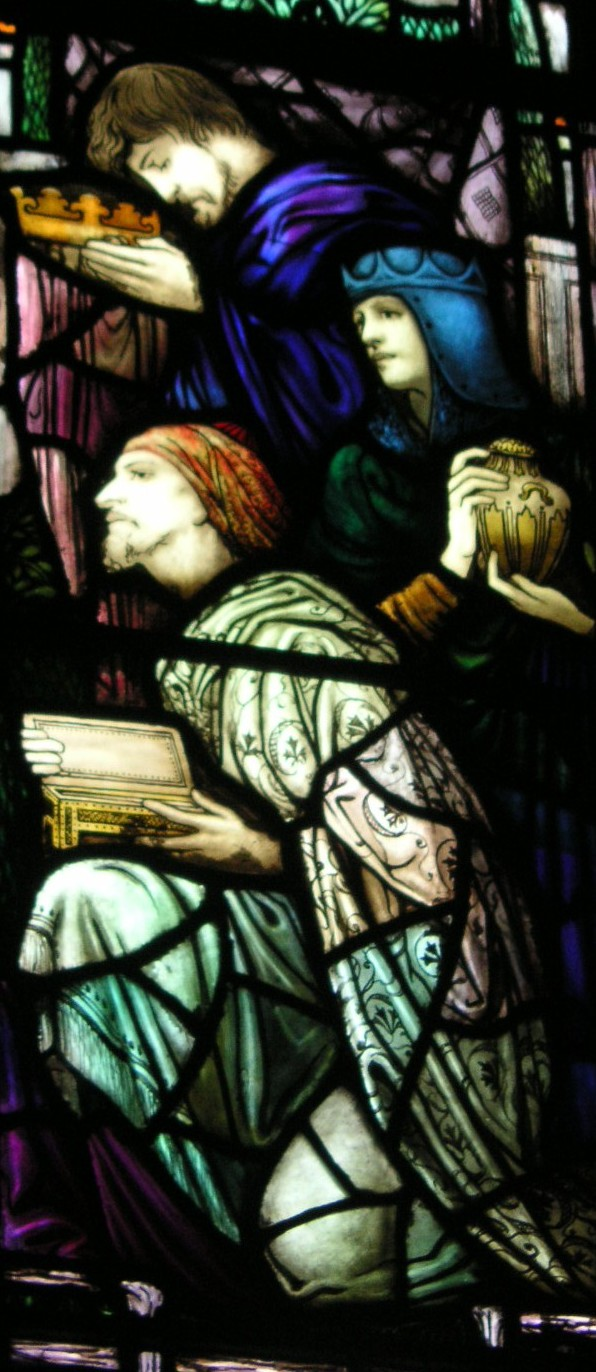
Taplow, Buckinghamshire, (1912)
