= Alfred Drury (stained glass artist) =

English stained glass artist

Alfred J. Drury
- Born: 1868
- Died: 1940 (aged 71–72)
- Known for: Stained glass
- Movement: Arts and Crafts movement

Alfred J. Drury (1868–1940) was an English stained glass artist, most notable for his partnership with Mary Lowndes of Lowndes and Drury.

== Work ==
Drury worked as a foreman at Britten & Gilson's, a firm which developed Norman Glass, a slab glass that was used by Christopher Whall and his followers.

== Lowndes and Drury ==
Another Britten & Gilson employee was Mary Lowndes whom he met in 1893. Together they founded the firm Lowndes and Drury in 1897 and were located at 35 Park Walk, Chelsea. In 1906 they built and opened the Glass House in Lettice Street, Fulham, London, which "provided a purpose-built stained-glass studio and workshop for independent artists." Christopher Whall and Drury designed the building that became a centre for prominent stained glass artists.

At The Glass House, Drury particularly focused on the creation of stained glass pieces. Together, Lowndes and Drury commissioned for design, painting and creation stained glass projects. Whall, Robert Anning Bell and Wilhelmina Geddes all produced work there.

== Instructor ==
On or before 1901 Drury was a teacher's assistant for Whall at the Royal College of Art. Then, in the 1900s Drury taught at the London County Council (LCC) Central School of Arts and Crafts and Royal College of Art.

By 1916, Drury taught at the LCC Central School of Arts and Crafts with Karl Parsons, where:

The stained glass students, who work in beautifully lighted classrooms on the top floor, are carefully instructed in the technicalities peculiar to their branch of the arts, and are required, in addition, to devote a sufficient time to drawing from draperies, plant forms, and the life.

— Charles Holme, Arts and Crafts (1916)

== Gallery ==
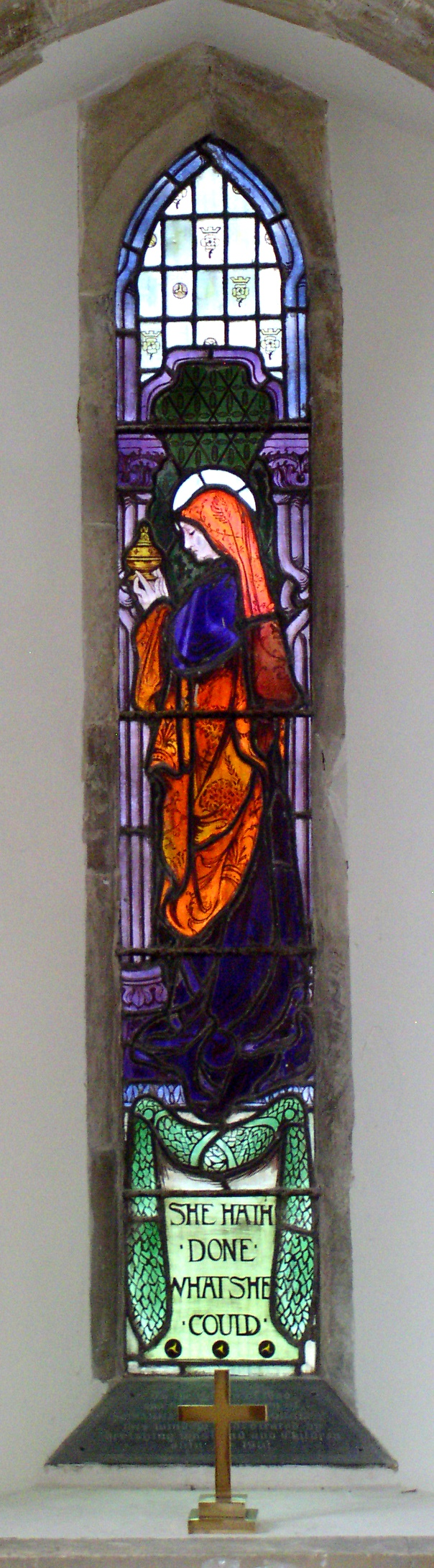
Lowndes & Drury, She hath done what she could, 1901, in St Peter's Church, Henfield, West Sussex.

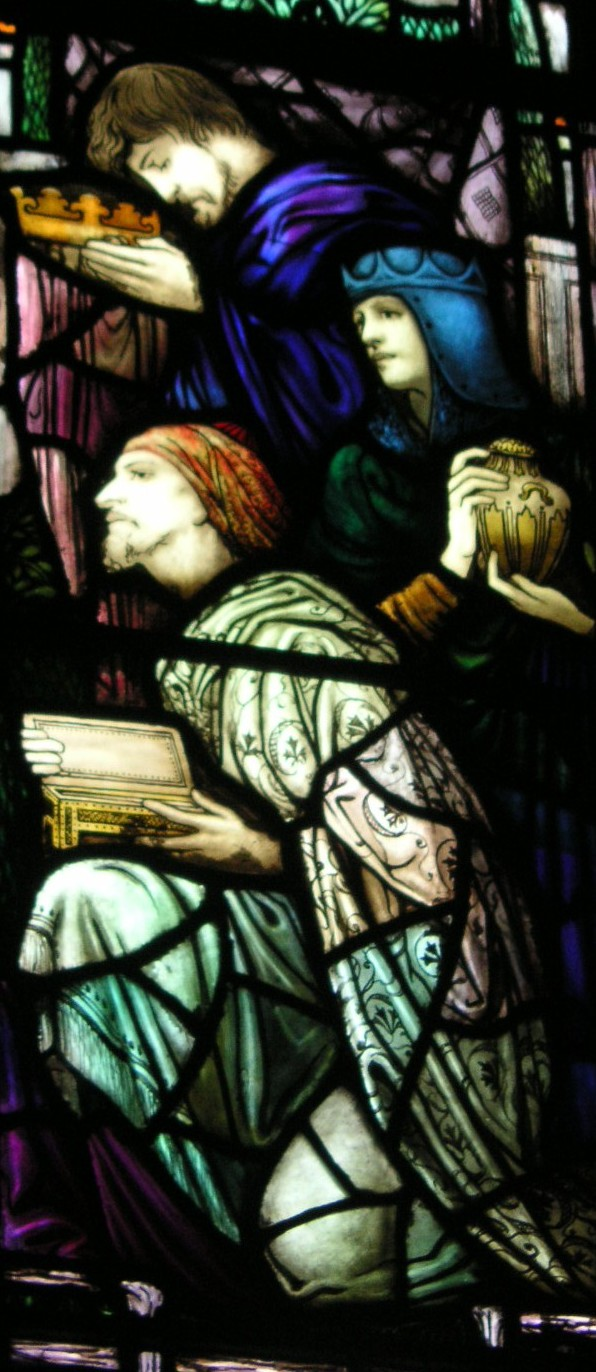
Lowndes & Drury, English stained glass, 1912, in Taplow, Buckinghamshire
