= Christopher Whall =

British stained-glass artist

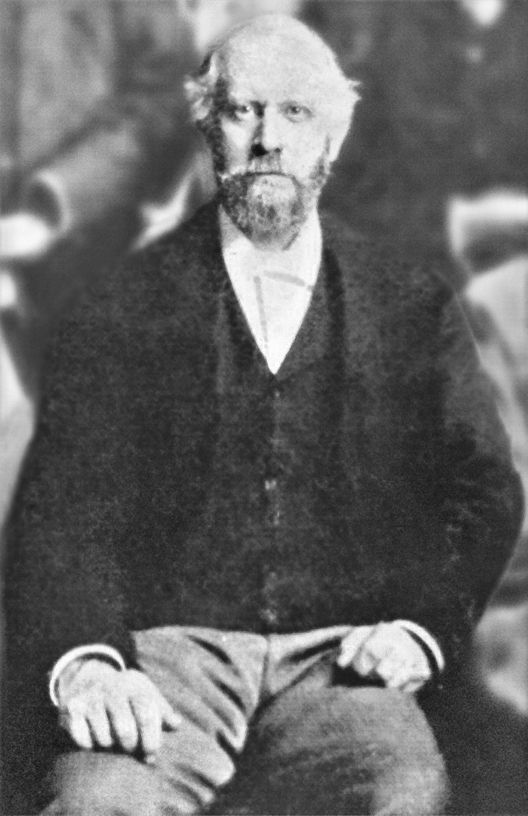
- Whall in 1902
- Born: 1849; Thurning, Northamptonshire, England
- Died: 23 December 1924 (aged 74–75)
- Known for: stained glass, teaching
- Notable work: Works of Christopher Whall
- Movement: Arts and Crafts
- Spouse: Florence Chaplin

Christopher Whitworth Whall (1849 – 23 December 1924) was a British stained-glass artist who worked from the 1880s and on into the 20th century. He is recognised as a leader in the Arts and Crafts movement and a key figure in the modern history of stained glass.

== Early life and studies ==
Christopher Whall was born in the rectory at Thurning, Northamptonshire, where his father, William Whall, was the rector. He was educated at home with his siblings until his teens. In 1863 he was sent to Rossall School in Lancashire. The drawing master there was William Coulter of the Royal Hibernian Academy. He left Rossall School in 1865, and in 1867 enrolled as a probationer at the Royal Academy Schools. On 8 January 1868 he was admitted as a student there—a professional path taken against his parents' wishes.

== Career ==
Whall moved to Edmonton to live with his mother after his father's death in 1874. He had hoped to find work as a portrait painter, but was offered few commissions. In 1874 Whall met the designer, A. H. Mackmurdo, founder of the Century Guild, and through him Selwyn Image, and contributed to the Guild's publication, The Hobby Horse. In 1875 and 1876 he exhibited at the Royal Academy. At this time he gained the patronage of a Hanoverian, Baroness von Boselager, who gave him funds to travel to Italy, where he was to stay for almost three years, travelling in central and northern Italy, studying architecture and paintings. In 1878 in Lucca he converted to Catholicism. Before going to Italy he had sought work as a portrait painter and as a studio assistant to other artists, but had had little success.

When he returned to London in 1879, almost penniless, he was befriended by the Rosminian Order of Charity at St Etheldreda's Church in Ely Place, Holborn and became a lay member of that Order. At St Etheldreda's he designed the side windows in the upper chapel, these windows being made by W. G. Saunders. By 1882 he was to leave the religious community at Ely Place, move to No. 18 Wharton Street in Clerkenwell and work as an illustrator of newspapers, novels and children's books, as well as assisting other painters and giving drawing lessons. He carried out designs during this period for several stained glass makers including John Hardman Trading Co. Ltd as well as James Powell and Sons.

=== Early Arts and Crafts movement ===
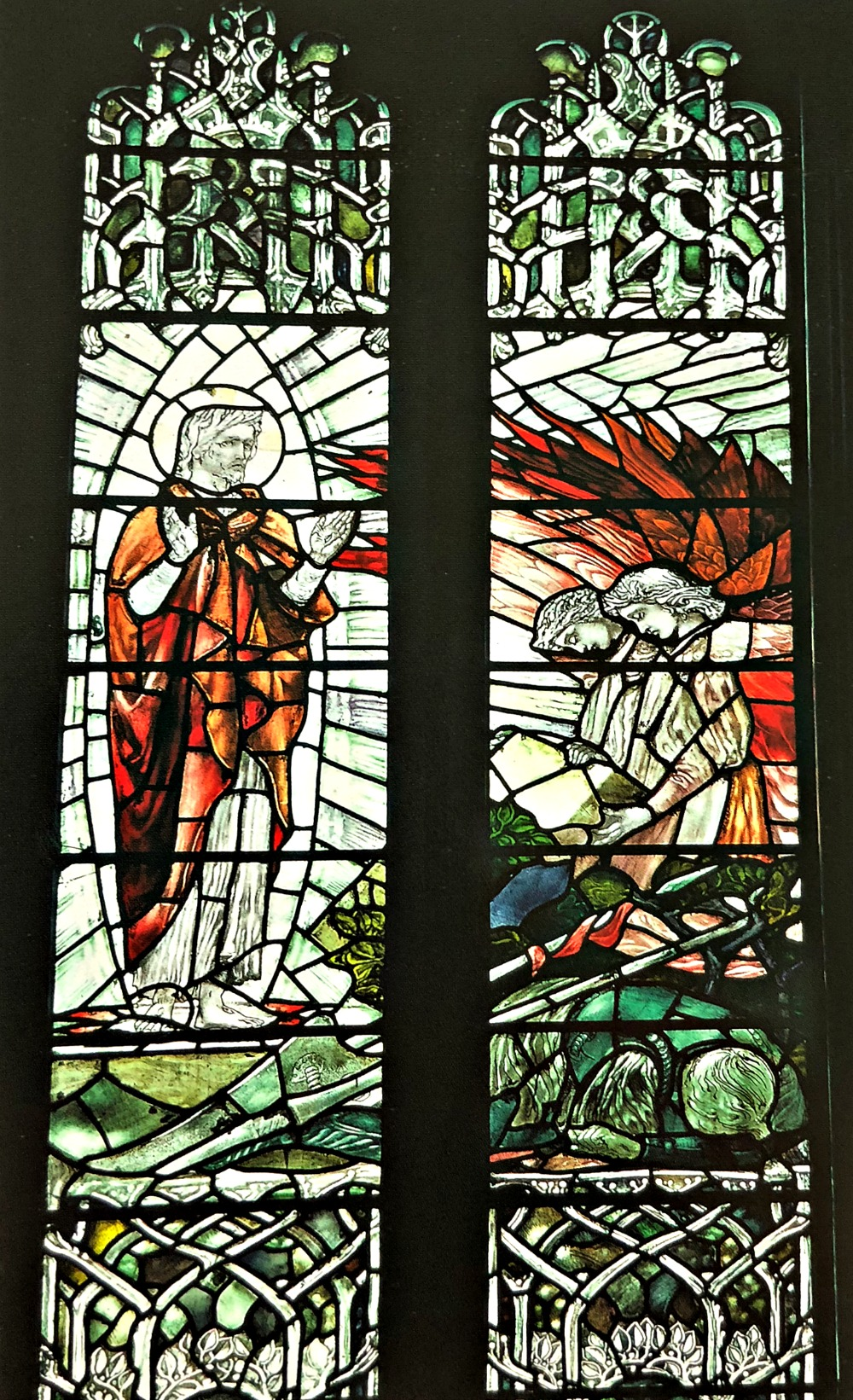
Resurrection window (1893), St Clement's Church, Boscombe, Dorset

Whall's career as an independent designer and maker of stained glass began in the late 1880s. This coincided with the emergence of the Arts and Crafts Movement through bodies such as the Art Workers' Guild and the Arts and Crafts Exhibition Society. Whall was actively involved in these two organizations for thirty years and was an influential spokesman for the medium of stained glass. In 1912, Whall was elected to the role of Master of the Art Worker's Guild.

Indeed, through James Powell and Sons he was to exhibit at that Society's exhibitions at the New Gallery in 1888 and 1889. The architects with whom he was to work at Holy Trinity Church, Sloane Street, John Dando Sedding and Henry Wilson (Note: Apart from the work at Holy Trinity, Sloane Street, Whall was also to work with Wilson on St Clement's Church in Boscombe, Dorset, St Augustine's Church in Highgate and St Martin's in Low Marple.) were also prominent within the movement. It was John Dando Sedding who was to give Whall his first independent commission, for the Lady Chapel East window of St Mary's Church in Stamford, Lincolnshire, which he completed in 1891.

Whall's participation in the early activities of the Arts and Crafts movement came soon after a life-changing event that had taken place in 1887. In that year he had converted the cow-shed at his cottage in Dorking into a workshop, where he set about learning all the processes of the craft: cutting, painting, firing and glazing, so that, in future, no part of the making of his windows would be beyond his control. This was a direct protest against the division of labour, then almost universally prevalent among commercial manufacturers, which Whall and others saw as incompatible with the production of stained glass as an art rather than simply a trade. During his time at Dorking, Whall was assisted by Louis Davis and Reginald Hallward, both of whom were to have distinguished careers as stained glass artists.

Whall's artistic style included using images from nature, a wide range of glass colours and textures, and new glass materials. His application of white glass for his windows was unique for the time. He was one of the earliest Arts and Crafts stained glass artists to include slab glass in his work. His work was considered groundbreaking in his use of Prior's "Early English" glass. The east window he created for St Mary's, Stamford, was the first large stained glass window to contain the new material.

=== Stained glass work and teaching ===
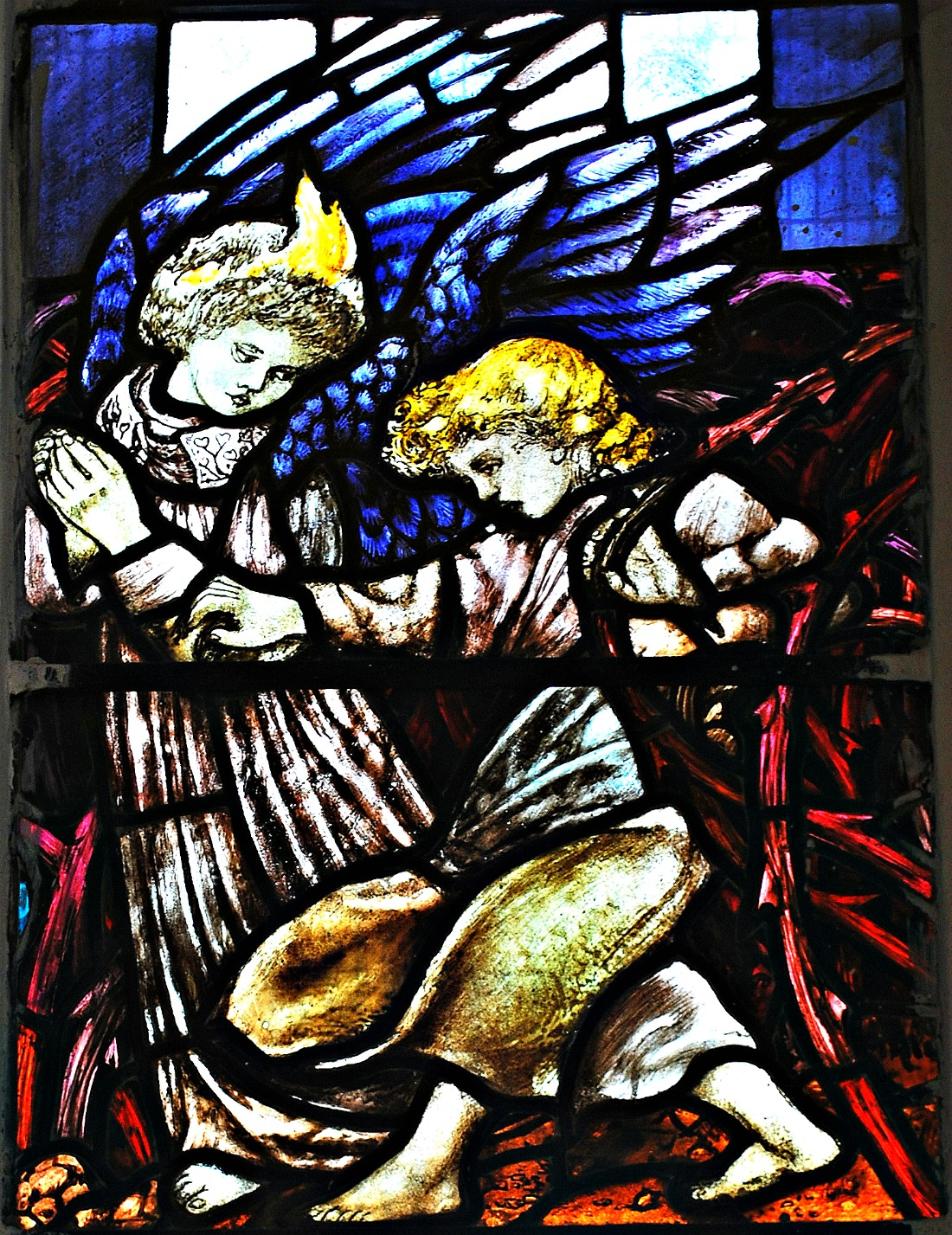
"Playful Angels" window (1899), St Andrew, Farnham, Surrey

For the decade after the Whalls left Dorking in 1896 he had no premises of his own for firing and glazing his stained glass, and during this period he worked closely with the firm of Lowndes and Drury and it was in their workshops that all his windows were fabricated between 1897 and 1906 (either at Park Walk in Chelsea or at Lettice Street). Lowndes and Drury was founded in 1897 by the artist Mary Lowndes, (Note: Mary Lowndes produced stained glass in her own right. Her work can be seen at Boxgrove in Sussex, Snape in Suffolk, Sturminster Newton in Dorset and Henfield in Sussex. She trained at the Slade School of fine Art and was a pupil of Henry Holiday. In 1906 she formed the Glass House in Fulham. From 1887 to 1892 she designed for James Powell & Sons, and set up Lowndes and Drury with Alfred Drury in 1897. Her work was much influenced by the designs and craftsmanship of Christopher Whall and she made extensive use of slab or "Prior" glass developed by the architect Edward Prior. Amongst the artists who were to work at the Glass House were Karl Parsons, Henry Holiday, Margaret Agnes Rope, M. E. Aldrich Rope, Evie Hone, Moira Forsyth, Hugh Arnold, Francis Spear and Carl Edwards.) and Drury with the aim of providing independent designer-craft workers with the necessary facilities to carry out their stained glass commissions.

At various times, particularly in the 1880s and 1890s, Whall was commissioned to design windows by James Powell and Sons. During this period, Whall created stained glass windows for churches in London, throughout England, and Wales. (See List of works by Christopher Whall.)

==== Central School of Art and Crafts ====
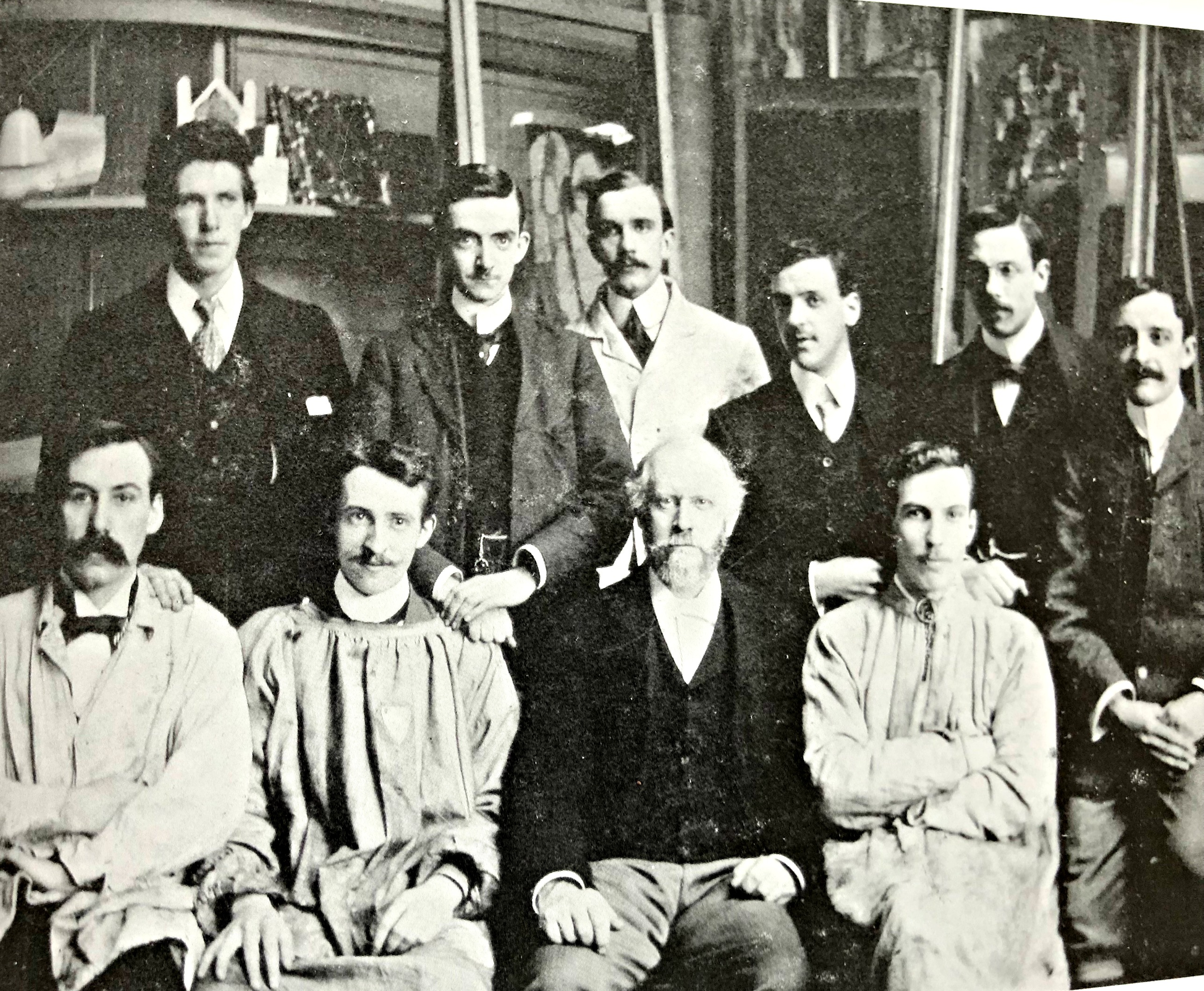
Christopher Whall and students at the Royal College of Art, 1902

The Central School of Art and Crafts was founded by the London County Council in 1896. Whall was hired by the school's directors, George Frampton and William Lethaby, to be among the eleven teachers at the school. He taught the craft of stained glass. Students taking Whall's class were a wide assortment of ages, backgrounds and level of experience. During the first school year, Whall taught his classes alone, but by 1897 he had hired Alfred Drury, an experienced glazer, to teach the crafts of leading and glazing. Whall's method of teaching, which he called the "Ruskin method", taught students to combine close observations and detailed workmanship along with more traditional artistic skills. He encouraged students by giving them small tasks to perfect before working up to large, more complex work. Whall was a gifted communicator and a popular teacher.

Whall resigned from his teaching position in 1905, but continued to work with the stained glass classes in an informal supervisory role. His successor at the school was Karl Parsons, former student and studio-assistant, and a strong follower of Whall's teachings.

==== Royal College of Art ====
Whall also taught at the Royal College of Art, informally from 1897, with the assistance of Alfred Drury to a formal teaching position at the school in 1901. A kiln was not available during Whall's time at the school, and the firing of students' glass painting was done at Lowndes and Drury studio. Whall taught at the school until 1909.

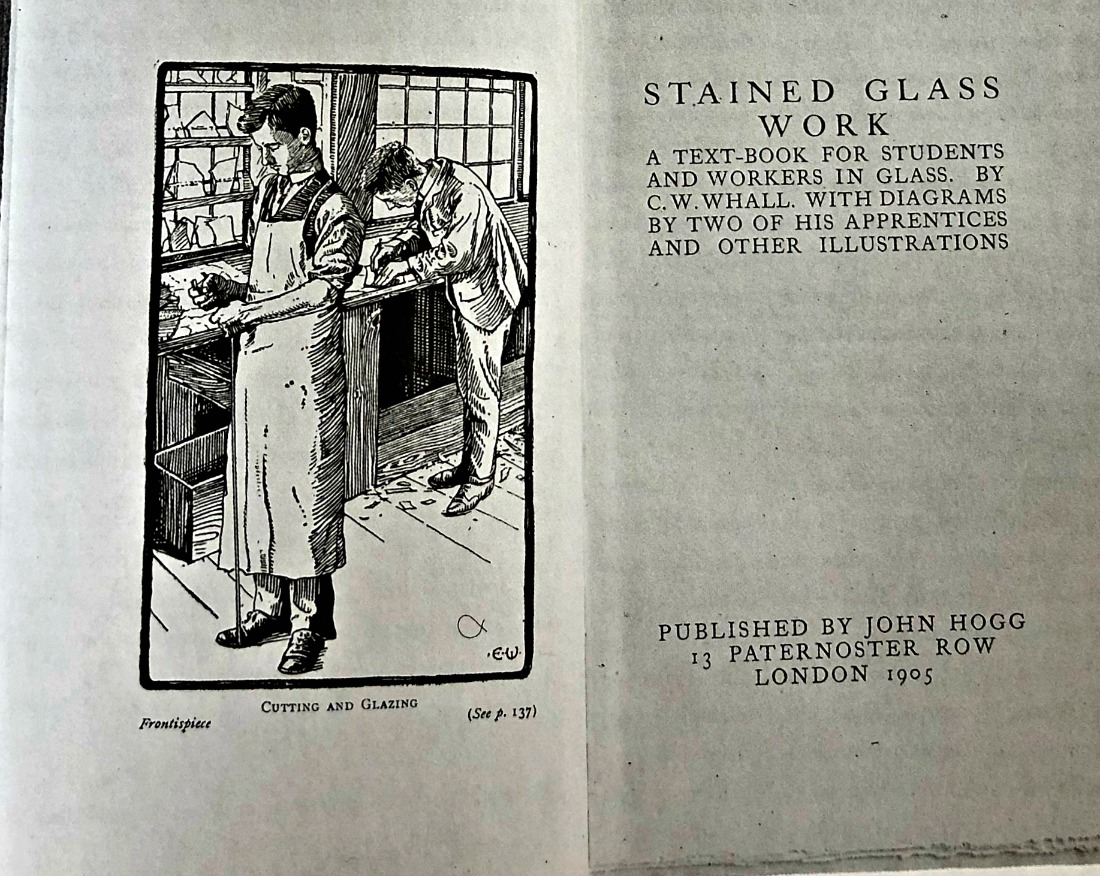
Stained Glass Work manual c. 1905

==== Stained glass manual ====
Whall's experienced his work as a stained glass artist and teacher as a vocation. While an instructor at the Central School of Art and Crafts, Whall was encouraged by school director, William Lethaby to write an instructional book about his craft. The book, Stained Glass Work, was published in London by John Hogg in 1905. Whall's manual was part of a series of books, which included the following manuals: lettering by Edward Johnston, silverwork by Henry Wilson, bookbinding by Douglas Cockerell and wood-carving by George Jack. This series has been almost in continuous print since the early 1900s, and continues to be influential today.

==== The move to Ravenscourt Park ====
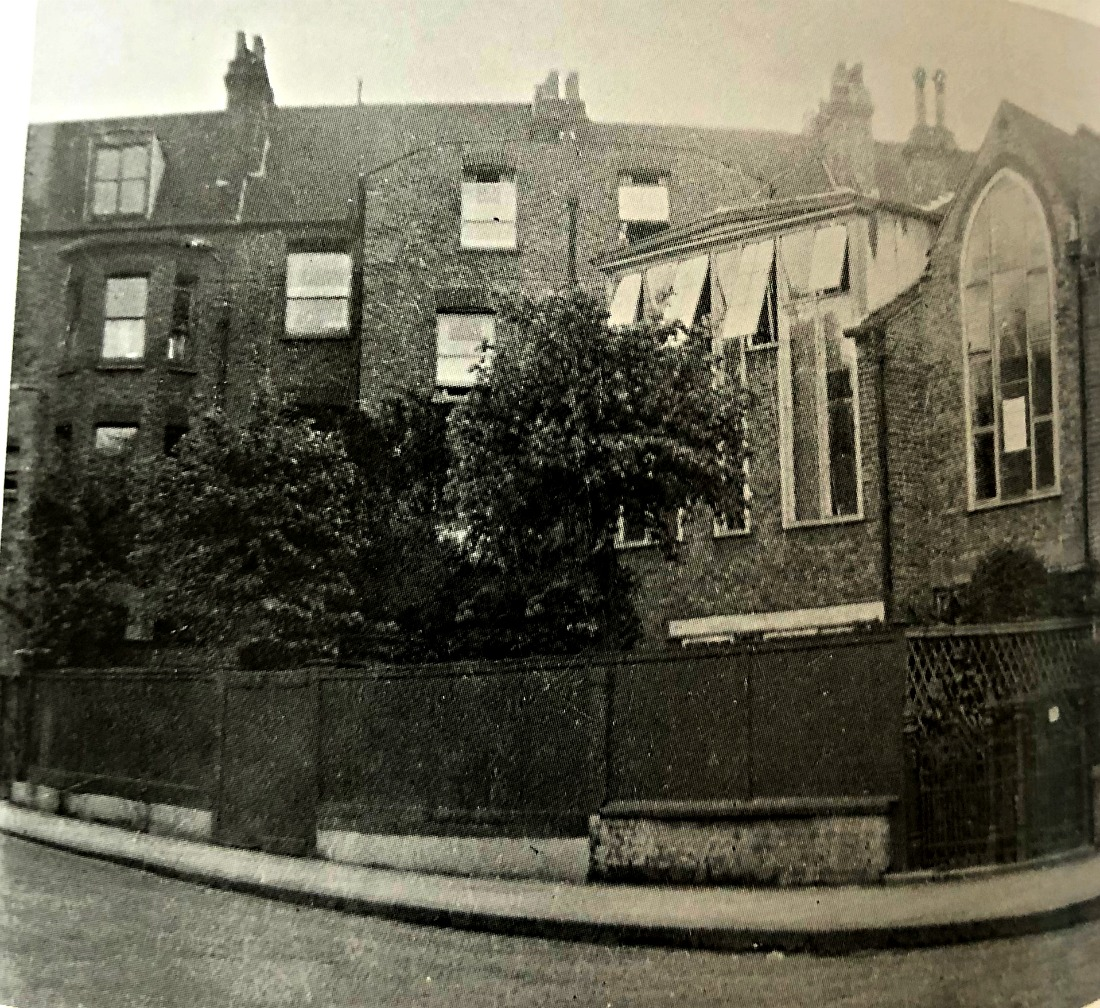
Ravenscourt Park studio workshop, c. 1910

In 1907, Whall decided to establish his own studio-workshop and took over the building at 1 Ravenscourt Park, Hammersmith. The site, was formerly used by his friend Charles Spooner, the architect, as a furniture making workshop. Whall hired Spooner to convert the upper floor and attic into a large studio with several large windows for cartooning and glass-painting, and the ground floor into a glazing workshop and kiln room. The building was used by Whall and his apprentices during 1907–1908, but the conversion was not fully completed until 1909. Whall's studio included innovative labor-saving devices, including "an improved tray for loading painted glass into the kiln and an easily movable glass-painting easel".

Whall's studio-workshops were always collaborative in nature. He fostered an environment where experimenting and continually learning was key, even for the instructor. He stocked the workshop with plants, insects and items from nature for inspiration for colour and design. A Greater London Council blue plaque on the Ravenscourt Park house commemorates his life there.

=== Later career and death ===
By the early 1920s, Whall was suffering from the early stages of leukemia. He handed over the management of his studio to stained glass designer and former pupil Edward Woore. Despite his illness, Whall continued to design and do some glass-painting, using a specially constructed adjustable chair.

In 1922, at the age of 73, Whall created the firm of Whall & Whall Limited, naming himself and his daughter Veronica as co-directors. She was a skilled stained glass artist and craftsman and created a number of stained glass works under the firm's name.

Whall's health continued to decline and he died on 23 December 1924, at the age of 75. Whall & Whall, under the management of Veronica Whall continued long after her father's death.

=== Artists influenced by Whall ===
Although there is no record of Whall having undertaken commissions in Ireland, except for Loughrea Cathedral, it does seem that he can be linked to the early 20th century stained glass revival in that country. The artist Wilhelmina Geddes was certainly influenced by Whall. Geddes was the artist who created the work "The Crucifixion" in St Luke's Church in Wallsend. (Note: Geddes was taught in Dublin by Alfred E. Child. Another great stained glass artist to emerge from the Arts & Crafts movement in Ireland was Harry Clarke (1889–1931). The Stained Glass Museum at Ely have his work "St Wilfrid and St John Berchmans of 1927.)

In September 1901 Alfred E. Child arrived in Dublin to take up the post of Instructor in Stained Glass at the newly reorganised Dublin Metropolitan School of Art and it seems that Whall was one of those who were behind this appointment along with the painter Sarah Purser, the poet W. B. Yeats and Edward Martyn the art critic. (Note: Edward Martyn, an Irishman who had founded the Palasterian Choir and the Abbey Theatre of Dublin, was interested in starting an Irish school of stained glass. He wrote "If we are determined to do bad work, it is better to have bad Irish than foreign". it was he who invited Christopher Whall to Ireland to execute three windows for the new cathedral at Loughrea. These windows were to be created by Irish craftsmen under Whall's direction.) Child had been trained by Whall and would try to bring Whall's principles to a new generation of Irish artists. Child and his artist friends aimed to set up a workshop similar to that formed by Mary Lowndes and Alfred Drury in London and in 1903 Sarah Purser set up "The Tower of Glass" (in Gaelic "An Túr Gloine").

Ralph Adams Cram, the architect, introduced Whall's work to the United States in the period 1906–1910, at All Saints Ashmont, Boston and Boston's Church of the Advent. For the Church of the Advent, Whall completed five windows depicting the five regions of the early church, starting with the first window on the east end of the south nave wall with St Ignatius of Antioch representing the Syrian Church and west of that St Athanasius representing the African Church. On the north side starting at the west end is St Ambrose of Milan for the Latin Church, then St Chrysostom for the Greek Church and finally St Columba, symbolising the Celtic Church.

== Personal life ==
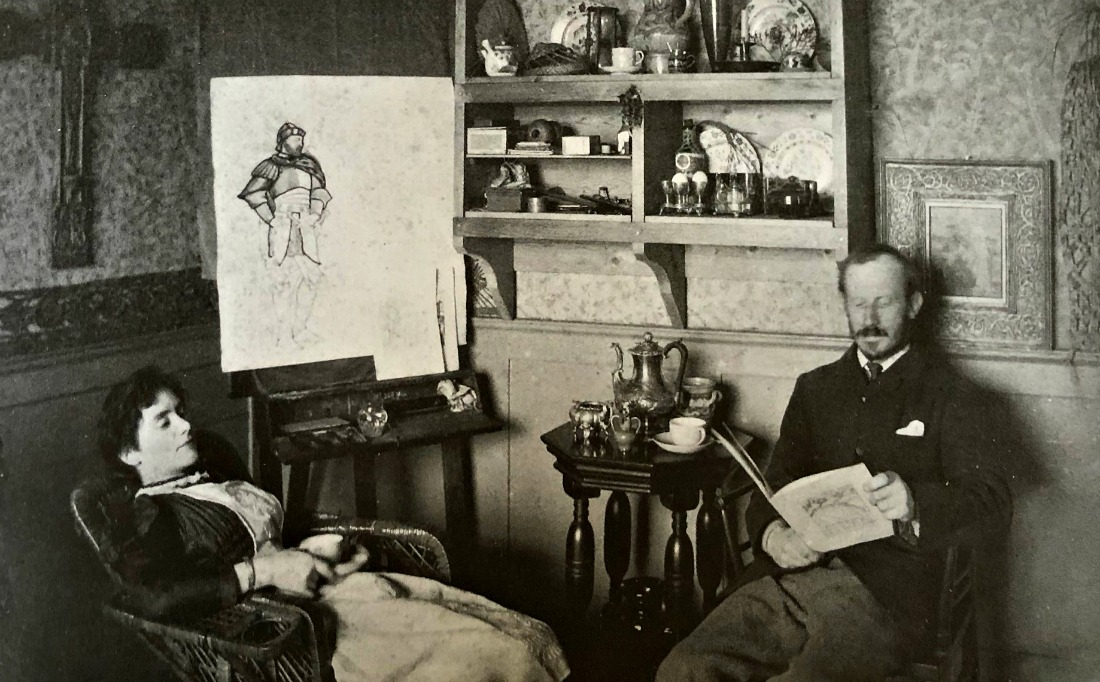
Christopher and Florence Whall, Ada Cottage, (1885), Dorking, Surrey

Whall married Florence M. Chaplin on 10 November 1884. In 1884 the family moved from London to Stonebridge, near Dorking, where they kept a smallholding with a cow, a pig and some chickens. Their five children were born between 1885 and 1894. Christopher John was born in 1885 and their daughter Veronica in 1887. The other children were Hew Bernard, Audrey (who died in infancy) and Louis.

In 1896, with increasing demand for work and the necessity to spend more time in London, Whall and his family moved to Eyot Cottage, Chiswick, London, where they shared the residence of architect Charles Spooner. Whall and Spooner were professional associates and good friends. They often collaborated on commissions and both shared an interest in leaded glazing.

Whall's wife and children were often models for figures in his stained glass windows. They often visited the studio-workshop to view the works in process. When windows were completed, Whall would often host fellow artists, clients, friends and family in the studio for a private viewing. His wife, Florence, and daughter, Veronica, would host the viewing party with tea, refreshments and music.

Whall's daughter Veronica was a student in his stained glass classes. She later became one of her father's studio-assistants. After his death, she took over management of his studio-workshop. She was a skilled artist and had a successful career as a stained glass artist.

== Images ==
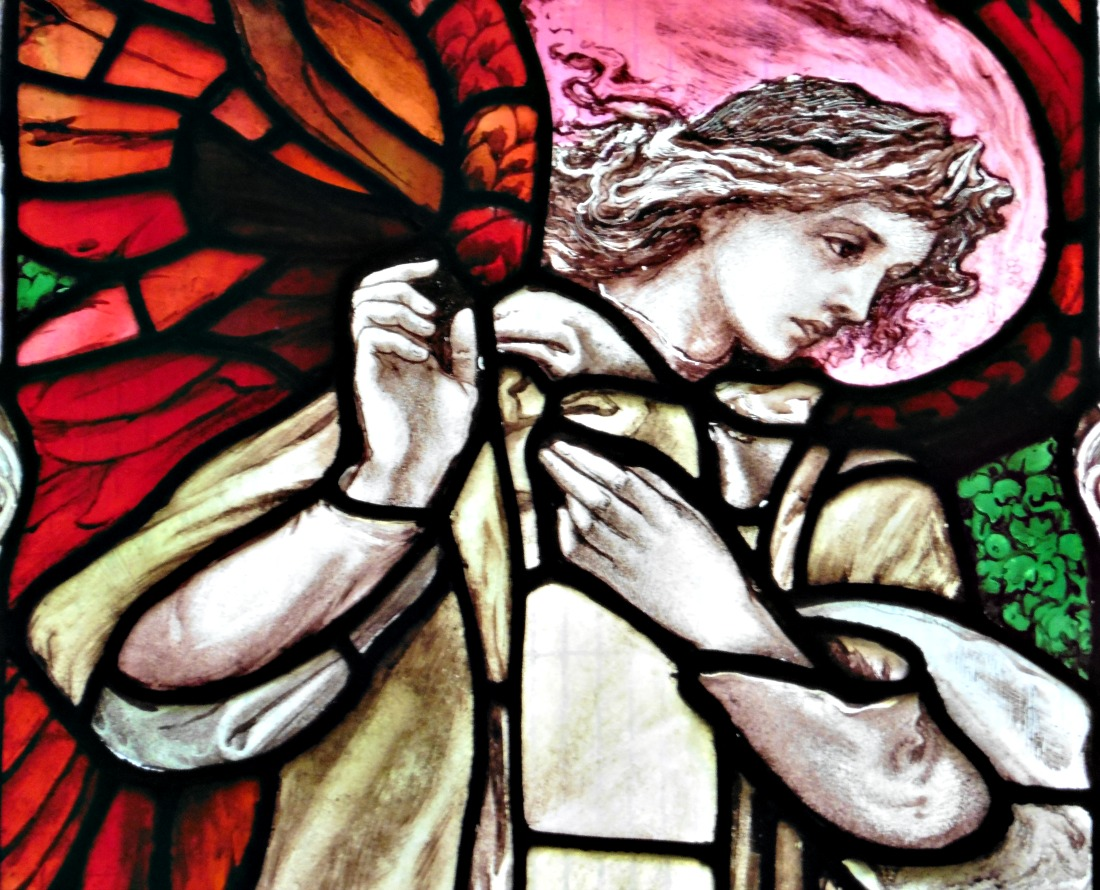
"Annunciation" (1898), Dogmersfield, Hampshire

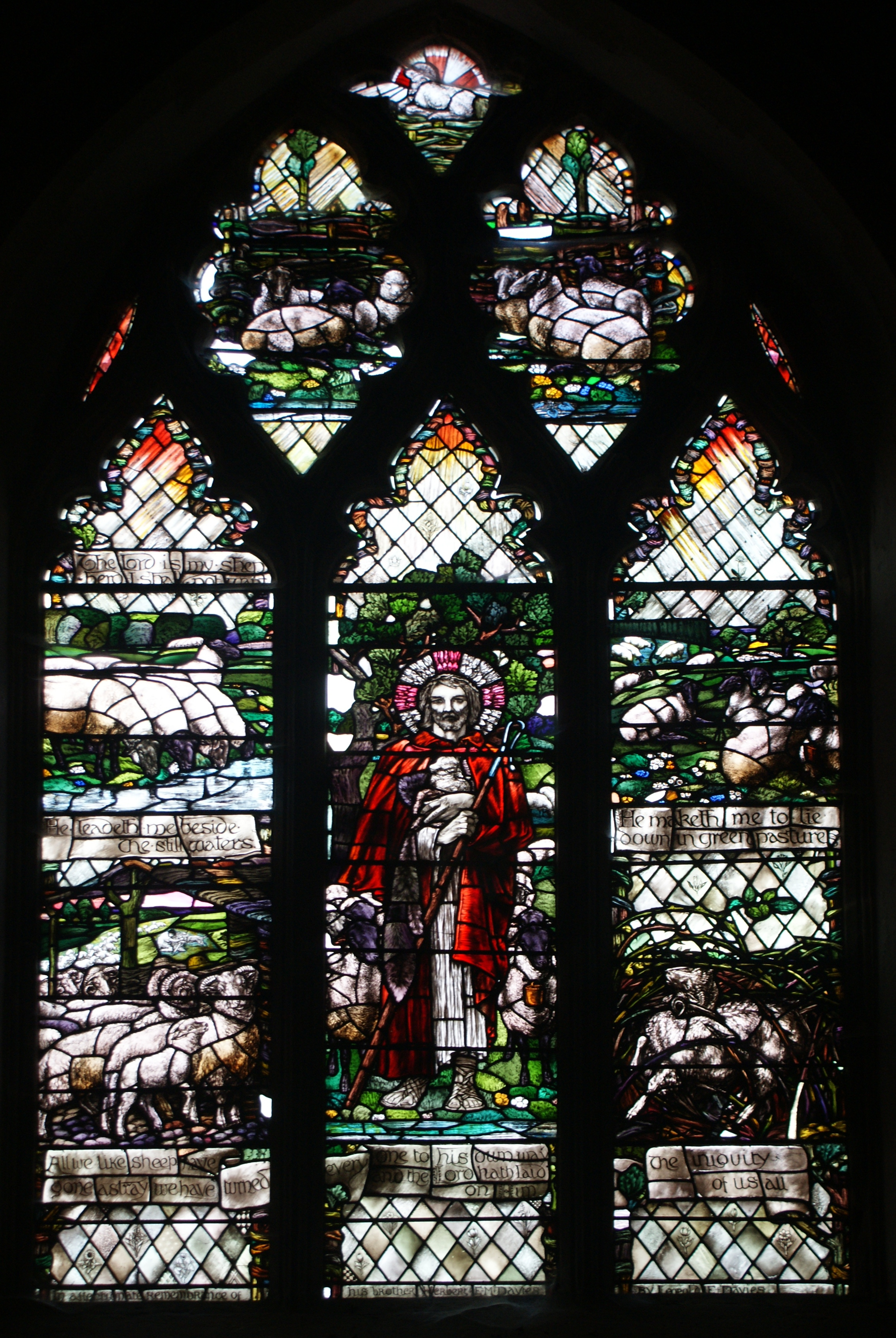
"The Good Shepherd" (1902), St Ethelbert, Herringswell, Suffolk

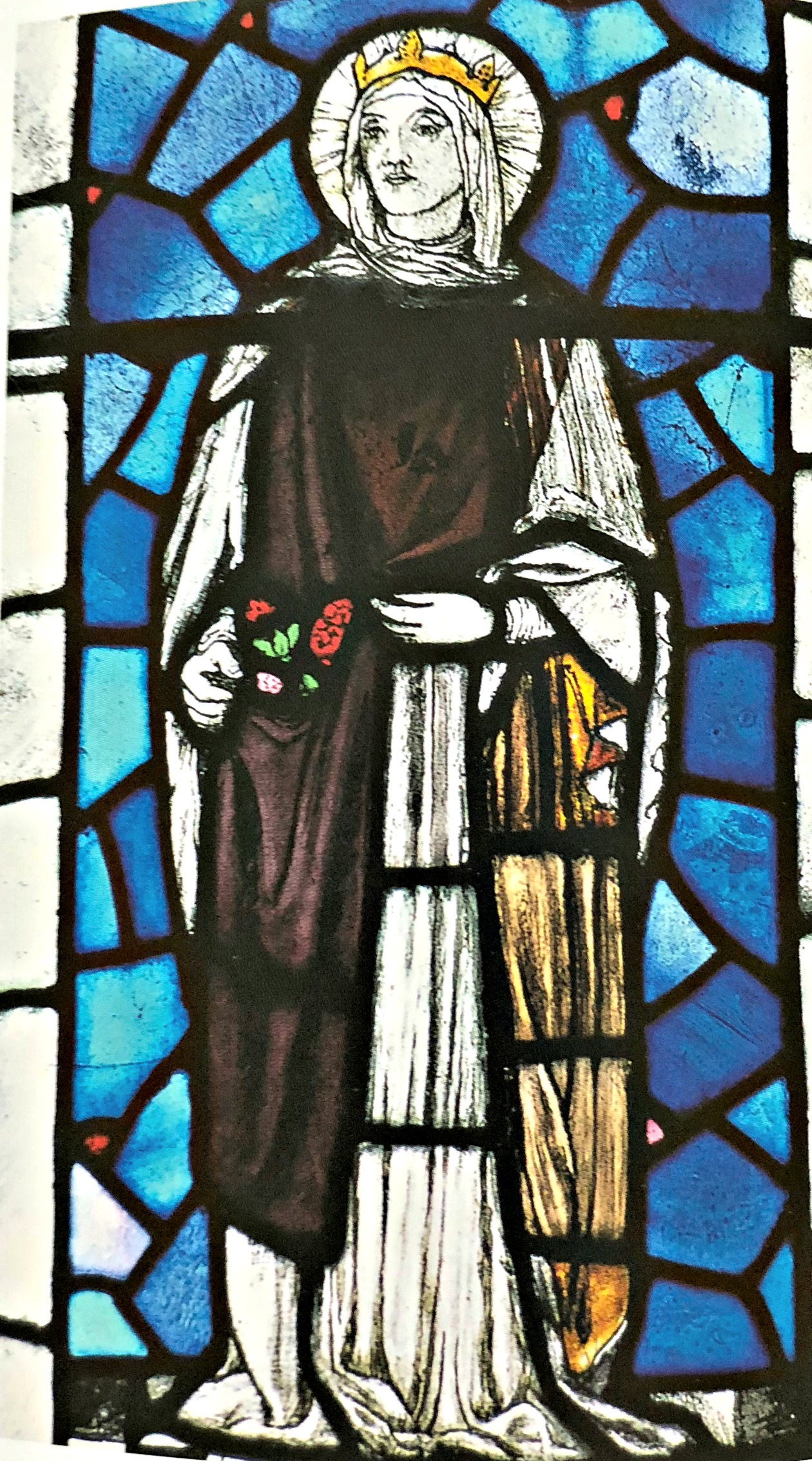
"St Elizabeth of Hungary" (1902), All Saints' Church, Brockhampton, Herefordshire

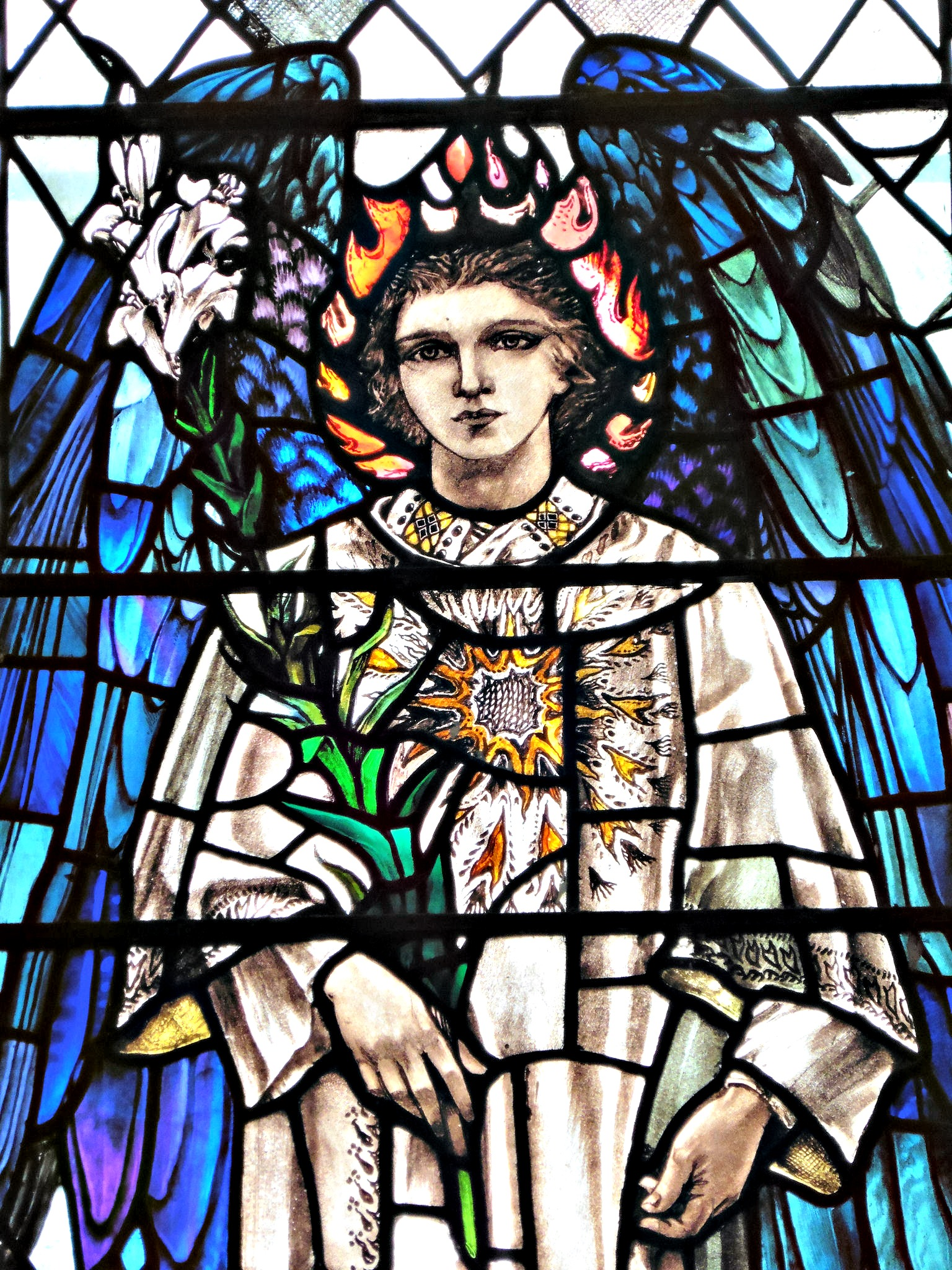
"Te Deum Laudamus" (1905), St Mary's Church, Ware, Hertfordshire

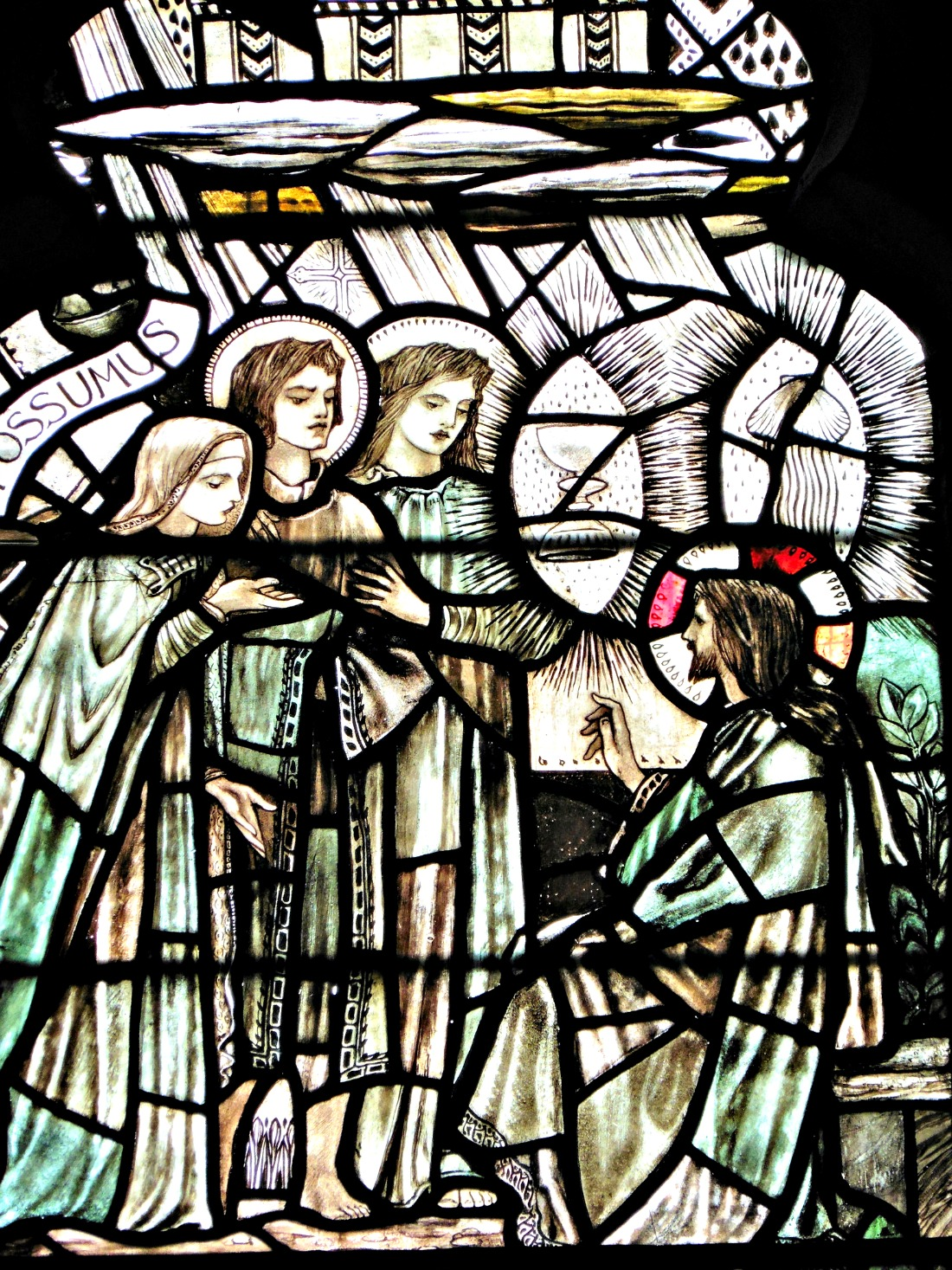
"St John the Baptist" (1907), Burford, Oxfordshire

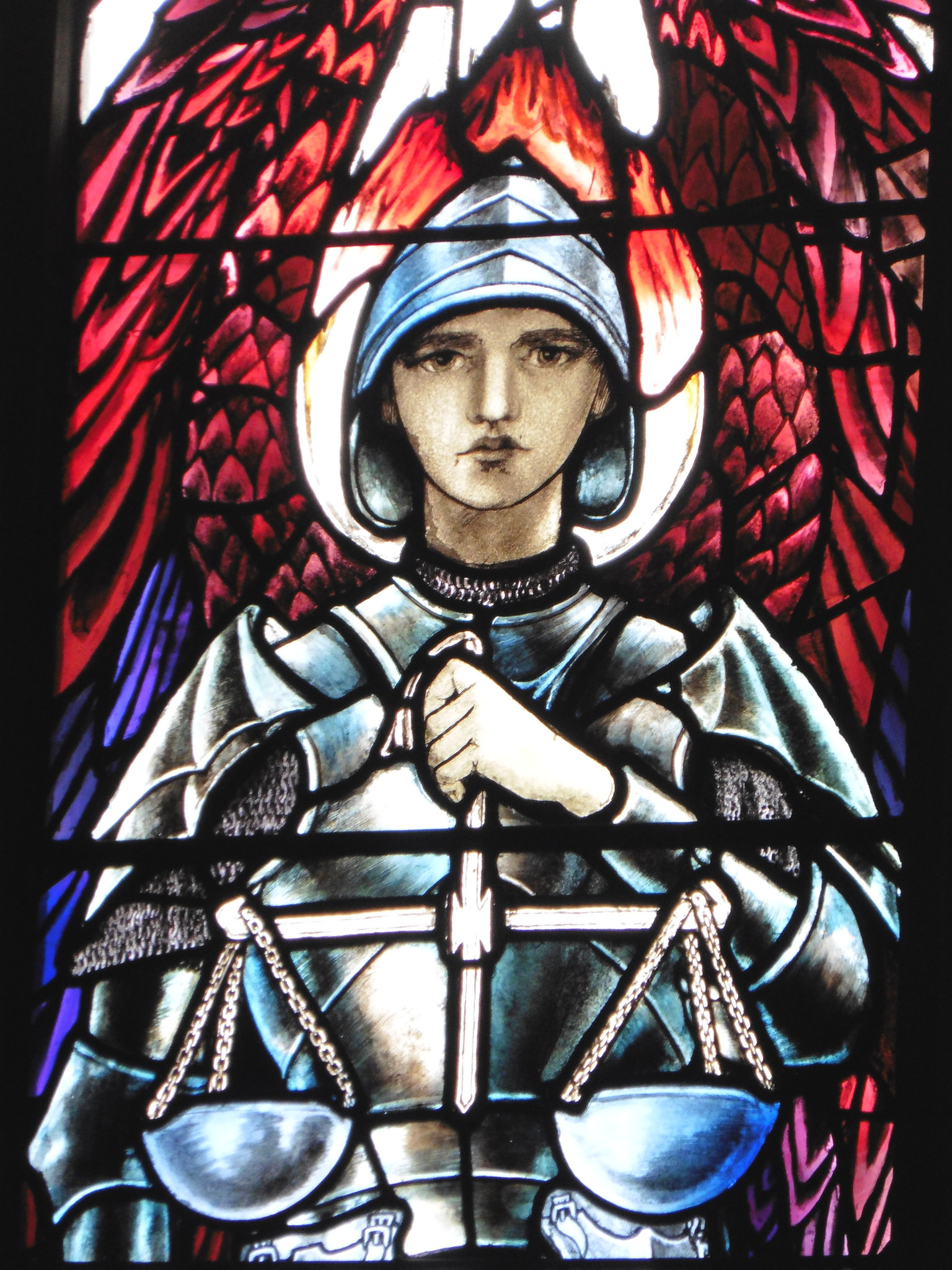
"Archangel Michael" (1920), Gray's Inn Chapel, London

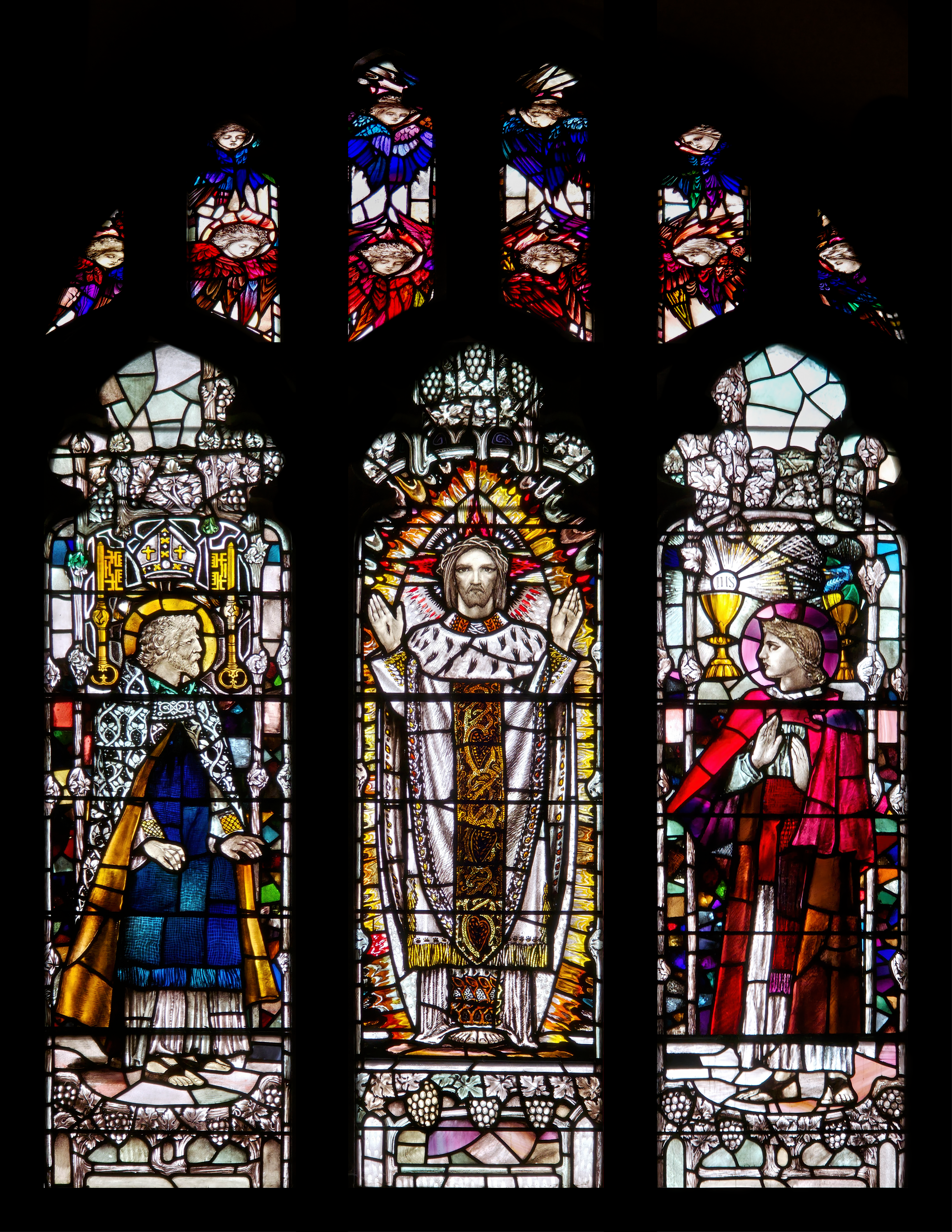
From Parish Church of All Saints Ashmont

== See also ==
- List of works by Christopher Whall
- Stained glass
- British and Irish stained glass (1811–1918)
- Edwardian era
- Aestheticism
