= List of works by Louis Davis =

- Born: 1861; Abingdon, Oxfordshire
- Died: 1941
- Education: Attended Abingdon School
- Known for: Stained Glass

This is a list of the stained glass works of English artist Louis Davis (1860–1941).

Of Davis' legacy, it was said: "His colour and design satisfy the sense of beauty, and the actual craftsmanship will always be a wonder to those who understand the art of glass-making."

== List of stained glass works ==
Church	Location	Date(s)	Subject, notes and references
St Michael and All Angels	Southwick, West Sussex	1897	A three-light window in the East Nave area serves as a memorial to Katharine Murton. Is inscribed "Crown of life and faithful unto death".
St Giles	Stoke Poges, Buckinghamshire	1899 and 1904	Davis designed two windows for this church, both of two-lights. The 1899 window is in the North Aisle North West and remembers Edward St John Parry. It depicts St Paul and St John the Evangelist. The 1904 window is in the North Aisle West and is dedicated to 7 Officers who died in the South African War, 1901 to 1903. It depicts St Michael and St George. This is the church where Thomas Gray reputedly sat and wrote his ' elegy in a country churchyard'.
St George	Foxley, Wiltshire	1901	Davis window in this church is of three-lights and is in memory of Walter Cecil Luce, the youngest son of the then churchwarden. Walter died of typhoid while fighting in the Second Boer War.
St Mary and St Nicholas	Littlemore, Oxfordshire	1902	This church had been planned by the Revd John Henry (later Cardinal) Newman. Davis executed a new East window replacing the existing 1840s window by Thomas Willement which was removed. The new window was in memory of the Revd Vernon Green who was the vicar from 1872 to 1896. The three lights involved cover the Nativity, Crucifixion and Resurrection.
St Peter and St Paul	Kilmersdon, Somerset	1914	Davis completed a four-light window for this church through James Powell and Sons. Image in gallery shown courtesy Geoff Rhymer.
St Anselm Church	Hatch End	1903 to 1932	Louis and his wife Ethel were members of the St Anselm congregation and Davis executed several windows for the church. In 1903, he executed a seven-light East window. Lights 1,2,5,6 and 7 feature scenes from St Anselm's life and lights 3 and 4 feature Angels and the Nativity. In the light depicting the "Virgin and Child", Davis shows the star of Bethlehem shining down and the light changes to a shaft of lightning as it strikes the serpent of evil coiled at their feet. Davis also carried out a two- light window called "I possess my visions and peace", a three-light window featuring Saints and Angels and a two-light window featuring a praying saint with angels. In 1931, he executed the central two lights of a four- light window entitled "Noli me Tangere" ("touch me not". According to the Gospel of St John this was said by Jesus to Mary Magdalene after His Resurrection.) This window was dedicated to Alice Millar. In 1932, he executed through James Powell and Sons, a two- light window with the theme "Galahad, mother & child ascending to Heavenly City". One St Anselm window installed in 1915 is a three-light First World War memorial window in the Baptistry, dedicated to Second Lieutenant Michael Hill and the centre light holds a fragment of clear ruby glass from the shattered windows of Ypres Cathedral sent back to England by Hill just before his death. Hill had served as a chorister and cross-bearer at the church and been baptised there. Davis it seems had known Michael. It was Davis who inserted the fragment and later inscribed it "Michael Hill, Ypres 1915." This window was dedicated on 29 July 1916. It depicts a young Christ as a warrior in the central light and kneeling angels in the lights on either side.
Paisley Abbey	Paisley	1906	Working through James Powell and Sons, Davis designed the St Margaret window for the Abbey.
St Michael & All Angels	Michaelstow, Cornwall	1906	Davis designed a three-light window for this church through James Powell and Sons. The window is in memory of Percy Muir who died in 1903 aged 10. Inscription in tracery includes the last lines from Cardinal J.H.Newman's hymn "Lead kindly light". "And with the morn those angel faces smile, which I have loved long since, and lost awhile."
Ardkinglas House	Ardkinglas, Argyll	1907	Through James Powell and Sons, Davis designed several windows featuring Scottish Coats of Arms for this building. Image in gallery below depicts the Coat of Arms of the Douglas Clan and is shown courtesy Jean Maskell.
Mottingham Lodge	Eltham, Kent	1894	Working through James Powell and Sons, Davis executed two panels for this building.
St John	Seven Kings, Essex	1908	Davis designed a two-light window for this church through James Powell and Sons. The theme of the window is the Nativity. The left hand light is dedicated to Walter Race who died on 25 November 1907 and the right hand light remembers Andrew Miller described as a "Faithful Worker of this Church" who died 5 January 1908. Image shown in gallery below courtesy Jonathan Evens.
St Colmon	Colmonell, Ayrshire	1908 to 1920	This church was built in 1849 and through James Powell and Sons, Davis completed several windows for the church. It was St Colmon of Ela who brought Christianity to the area. Colmonell is situated in the glen of the River Stinchar and is regarded by many as one of the most attractive villages in south Ayrshire. Davis was responsible for the furthest West single-light window in the North wall of the church, the window being entitled "The Nativity". The window depicts Joseph and Mary who holds the baby Jesus while two little infant angels kneel in adoration. The Dove of the Holy Spirit sits on the stable roof with two cherubim and above two angels hold the star which shines down on the scene below. "Gloria in Excelsis Deo et Terra Pax" says the inscription and in the window's lower panel, Davis depicts the "Fons Vitae" (Fountain of Life). The window is in memory of William McConnell who died in 1902 aged 93 and his wife Margaret Bradshaw McConnell who died in 1881 at the age of 57. Davis also designed the three-light window in the West wall of the church entitled "The Sacraments; Praise; All the Works of God". In the left hand light, the Sacraments are represented by angels. One angel holds a chalice, "Calicem salutaris accipaiam et nomen domini invocabo", (I'll take the cup of Salvation and call upon the name of the Lord), while a second angel stands at a large font, "Confiteor unum Baptisma remissionem peccatorum", (I confess one baptism for the remission of sin). The centre light depicts men, women and children, lay and religious, monarchs and saints, ascending to the City of God, "Jerusalem Ecce Ascendimus", (Behold we go up to Jerusalem). In the right hand light all the works of God are represented- Sun, moon, stars, wind and snow, the fruits of the earth and a symbolic figure of Water holding a model Ark, an allusion to the Flood which was likened to Baptism by the early Church. Below figures offer up praise. including a shepherd and his dog (named "Masha") and school children representing the sons of the donor. There was indeed a shepherd who worked on Bardrochat whose dog was known as "Masha". The window was donated by Robert Finnie McEwen of Bardrochat. Robert Finnie McEwen himself is depicted in the window as a bishop. Davis also designed the heads of two windows in the organ loft area. In the east wall, gallery, north of the organ a single light window has Grace depicted as rose petals falling and in the second, south of the organ, Praise is depicted as incense rising- "Omnis Spiritus Laudet Dominus", (Let every Spirit praise the Lord).
St Hilda's Oratory	Bethnal Green	1909	Davis designed two single light windows for St Hilda's, this through James Powell and Sons.
Lympne Castle	Lympne. Kent	1909	Working through James Powell and Sons, Davis designed some tracery for the Castle windows.
St Peter and St Paul	Great Bowden, Leicestershire	1909	Through James Powell and Sons, Davis designed a four-light window for this church. The window is a memorial to Hugh D A Owen who was killed while hunting, and is based on the text of 1 Samuel 20 v35-end. David and Jonathon are depicted saying their last goodbyes on earth, and above them there is a sower in a field, a sheepfold with 2 shepherds, and in the small windows there is a tree with an inscription in Latin meaning- after winter flows summer.
Devonport Dockyard Chapel	Devonport, Devon	1909	Davis designed a two-light window for the chapel in 1909 through James Powell and Sons.
Holy Trinity	St Andrews	1910 to 1914	Davis completed four windows for this church in around 1912. They illustrate the life of Christ. The "Crucifixion" window has a depiction of Christ on the Cross in the centre light with His Mother Mary and St John. It bears the inscription "Woman behold thy son. Behold thy mother". The other four lights show kneeling martyrs. These are, from left to right, St Christopher with his staff, St Barbara with her tower and scourge, St Laurence with his gridiron, St Catherine with her wheel, St Cecilia with chaplets of roses and lilies, St Margaret of Antioch with her cross, St Dorothea with her basket of roses and apples and St Cyprian with mitre, crozier and the ring. Above the martyrs are emblems of the Crucifixion; the Lamb in the Thicket (the Sacrifice of Isaac), the Serpent in the Wilderness, the Water issuing from the Rock and the Tree in the Garden. Across the four outer lights are the words "To him that overcometh will I give to eat of the Tree of Life which is in the midst of the Paradise of God". The "Crucifixion" window was given by their daughters and grandson in memory of Alexander Hunter Bellvue, who had donated the chapel and been an Elder of the Kirk, and his wife Isabella Coul. Another window is entitled "The Agony in the Garden of Gethsemane". Christ is shown kneeling across the brook Kedron, His Hands uplifted in prayer. Behind Him is a thorn with five crimson roses and in the distance three sleeping disciples. Judas leads a crowd out of the city and to the left a supporting angel is shown in radiant clothes. Angels appear in the outer lights and those on the left raise a soul up from the depths with the words "Out of the deep have I called unto Thee" and on the right angels guide a soul up a steep and rocky path to the shining city above with the words "Thou wilt show me the Way of Life". This window was given by his widow in memory of the Very Revd A.K.H.Boyd DD LID who was Minister of the First Church of Holy Trinity (1865–99). The window entitled "The Baptism of Christ" depicts Christ in white. He stands with hands folded in the river Jordan with two angels in attendance. The Holy Spirit descends "like a dove". To the right John the Baptist with staff in hand, holds a shell for the baptismal water. In the left hand light an angel pours out water from the golden fountain with an inset above showing the Ark on the waters. ""With Thee is the Fountain of Life". In the right light an angel by the font has an inset above showing the Passage of the Israelites through the Red Sea. "Wash me and I shall be whiter than snow". This window was given in memory of Mrs.Euphemia Leslie Meldrum and Mrs Elizabeth Russell of Kenly Green. In the final window "The Nativity", we see Mary, traditionally dressed in blue, kneeling beside the cradle in which lies her infant Son. Above angels hover round a star. In the outer lights doleful angels bear gifts, the Instruments of the Passion. In the right light an angel points a spear towards the green dragon which appears in the lower part of all three lights this representing Evil being overcome by the Coming of the Light of the World. This window given in memory of Janet, widow of the Very Revd A.K.H. Boyd DD DID.
St Giles Cathedral	Edinburgh Midlothian	1910	Robert Lorimer designed the richly decorative Thistle Chapel which was added to the South East of the Choir in 1910. The Thistle Chapel contains a wealth of intricately carved woodwork including large and numerous ceiling bosses, steepled and crested canopies rising above the stalls to each side and heraldic stained glass made by Louis Davis to Lorimer's designs.
St Silas the Martyr	Kentish Town		Davis' window in this church is above the confessional area and is entitled "Hope". The figure of Hope ("Spes" in the inscription-Latin for hope), tip-toes through some daffodils and looks up towards heaven. At the bottom of the window is the inscription "Laus Deo". This church also has some remarkable stained glass by Henry Victor Milner (1866–1944). The church was consecrated on 26 October 1912. The architect was Ernest Charles Shearman. Davis' window for All Saints in Longstanton, Cambridgeshire has an almost identical depiction of "Hope".
Nayland United Reformed Church, formerly Nayland Congregational chapel	Nayland, Suffolk	1912	Davis designed a three-light window for this chapel, working through James Powell and Sons.
Heathfield School Chapel	Ascot, Berkshire	1912 to 1915	Working through James Powell and Sons, Davis designed several windows for this chapel. Image shown in gallery courtesy Paula Lavender.
St James	Barton Hartshorn, Buckinghamshire	1914	Davis completed a two-light war memorial window for this church with the title "The Messenger of Peace". It remembers Lieutenant Archibald Trotter of the Coldstream Guards. The window has St George in the left hand light and a kneeling Angel in the right hand light. Commissioned by Col.Charles W.Trotter, C.B.and the Hon.Mrs.Trotter.O.B.E. of Barton Hartshorn Manor. Archibald was their son. He died on 31 December 1914, aged 22 years and is buried in Le Touret Military Cemetery. The kneeling angel is depicted kissing a dove of peace. St George stands resplendant in a suit of armour painted in blue! In the tracery at the top of the window is the badge of the Coldstream Guards. Interesting to note that Colonel Trotter had used Sir Robert Lorimer (1864–1929) the Scottish architect and garden designer to restore Barton Hartshorn Manor at an earlier date, and given that Davis was a favourite of Lorimer, it is likely that Lorimer influenced Trotter to give Davis the commission for the war memorial window.
St John the Baptist	Pinner, Middlesex	1914	A two-light window entitled "Faith" and "Hope". Here Davis was again working for James Powell & Sons.
Holy Trinity	Blendworth, Hampshire	1911	For this church, Davis designed through James Powell and Sons, a two-light window which served as a memorial to a Blendworth man, Eric Thain, who had drowned in an accident at Inverary on 30 May 1911 aged 17 years. Thain had been a chorister at the church. He also designed for Powell the South window in the church. It is a single light window with the inscription "In pious remembrance of William Anton Margesson, Priest, who died in mid-Africa in 1898, and in the 32nd year of his age."
St John the Baptist	Great Gaddesden, Hertfordshire	1917	Davis' window is the second window in the Nave area. It is of three lights and depicts St Francis of Assisi.
St Peter	St Albans, Hertfordshire	1918	Davis' War Memorial window on the North Aisle, North wall, East, is entitled "Sacrifice" and is in memory of Frederisk Mead who died 11 August 1915, aged 58, and his two sons, Joseph Frederick Mead, Second Lieutenant, 4th Battalion The Royal Fusiliers, educated at Winchester College and Sandhurst who was killed defending the Nimy Ridge at Mons on 23 August 1914. He was 22 years of age. Also remembers Robert John Mead, also a Second Lieutenant but with the 8th Service Battalion The Royal Fusiliers. Also educated at Winchester, he died from his wounds at Armentieres Hospital on 2 August 1915. Mounted below the window is a light brown marble tablet with details of the Mead brothers and the tablet is inscribed with the words "E'en as they trod that day to God so walked they from their birth. In simpleness and gentleness and honour and clean mirth", this a quotation from Rudyard Kipling. The crests of the Royal Fusiliers and Winchester College are at the centre of the inscription. The window was financed and donated by Mrs Mead as a memorial to her husband and her two sons lost in the war. The window is of three-lights. The light on the left hand side depicts Sir Galahad. He stands on the steps of a wayside shrine, before an altar with candlestick, crucifix, chalice and paten. In the foreground is an iris plant known as Swordlily. In the centre light we see Christ crucified and in a white scroll beneath is the inscription "Ecce/Agnus/Dei" – Behold the Lamb of God (John.1.36). Below Christ is the figure of Isaac, who lies horizontally on rocks, his arms and waist roped to a wooden cross. Below him an angel leans down over a knight who kneels on rocks in the foreground. This knight represents Abraham. On the ground, by his knee, is a censer and a wide spiral of grey smoke leads upwards to the bound Isaac. On a black band along the base is the text "In Monte Dominus videbit" – In the mount the Lord shall see.( Gen.XXII.14). In the right hand light the Angel of the Grail is standing in benediction and holds a chalice. The Angel wears mass vestments, an alb without apparel, and a chasuble with a T-shaped red orphrey. It seems that Davis was a friend of the incumbent at the time, Rev.W.E.Chadwick (1910–1925) who asked him to design the window.
St Martin	East Woodhay, Hampshire	1919	Davis executed the five-light East window for this church. The left hand light depicts St Christopher, lights two, three and four depict the Nativity and the right hand light depicts St Michael. In part of the window is an inscription to say that the window was in memory of Walter George Guillemard, a scholar of Winchester and New College Oxford, a Harrow master who died at his home Malverleys on 8 May 1916. In another panel, Phyllis, the daughter of Walter George Guillemard and his wife Olive, is remembered. Phyllis had served in the Army Nursing Service V.A.D, and died on duty on 28 November 1916 aged 25.
St Mary the Virgin	Kelvedon, Essex		Davis was responsible for the "Annunciation" window in the Lady Chapel, this through James Powell & Son. The window is dedicated to two sisters, Jane Browne Frere and Marianne Dalton. Davis designed the window for Powell of Whitefriars who made and installed it. Image in gallery below shown courtesy David Larner.
Dunblane Cathedral	Dunblane	1913 and 1917	His work in Dunblane includes the window above the South-West doorway in the South Aisle. This is a 1917 two-light window in memory of Lt Col John Boyd Wilson. Wilson was an elder of the cathedral and was killed at Gallipoli in 1915. The figures represent St George and Hope. Between the tower and the south-west doorway are the Barty windows, erected in 1917 by the family of Dr and Mrs J W Barty in their memory. The subject of these two windows is the "Nunc Dimitis", or Song of Simeon (St Luke ii: 29–32). It is however Louis Davis' six great choir windows of 1913 that are rightly regarded as some of the best stained glass in Scotland; the four windows called "Allegory", "Chaos", "Earth" and "Humanity", these flanked by the four archangels Michael and Gabriel on one side and Uriel and Raphael on the other. The windows were presented by Sir Robert Younger, later Lord Blanesburgh, in memory of his mother. They portray the "Benedicite Omnia Opera" – the song "O all ye works of the Lord, bless ye the Lord" found in the apocryphal Additions to the Book of Daniel, one version of which is Psalm 148. The windows in sequence are firstly the "Allegory" window which shows the great features of the heavens: sun, moon, stars, clouds and the four winds. Next is the "Chaos" window which shows fire, storms, cold and snow and at the bottom are the names of the five members of Scott's ill-fated expedition to the South Pole of 1912. Next in sequence is the "Earth" window, with representations of animals, grass and water. At the top the dove, symbolising the Spirit of God, flies above the waters. There is a suggestion of salvation in the picture of the ark which carried Noah and his family through the flood. Finally the "Humanity" window completes the series and crowns it, just as man is the crown of creation. Adam and Eve can be seen at the bottom right, with Jacob and David above, and the three young men who sang the "Benedicite". To the left the blessed make their way to the heavenly Jerusalem, and among them are portrayed St Blane, the visionary poet, William Blake(who wrote the words of the hymn "Jerusalem")and Queen Margaret of Scotland who was declared a saint when the cathedral was being built by Clement, St Louis of France and St Francis of Assisi.
St Laurence	Ludlow. Shropshire	1912 and 1928	Davis completed two windows for this church. The fourth window in the North Aisle was inserted in 1912 and commemorated Humphrey, the eldest son of Theophilus Salway. The window was paid for by Mrs.J.D.White. It depicts the Virgin Mary with the Infant Christ, Jacob's dream, an angel with St John the Evangelist (in red cloak) on Patmos and the arms of Salway and others. The second window in the north aisle was inserted in 1928 and given by Mrs.Gratton in memory of Theophilus Salway and his sisters Agnes, Mary and Katharine. The first light depicts an angel (blue) descending upon a kneeling St Agnes. St Agnes was a Roman virgin martyred under Diocletian in A.D.304. Her emblem is the lamb, which is seen at the top of the window. According to legend she was beheaded because the flames in which she was to be burnt would not touch her body. In the second light, Davis depicts the martyrdom of St Stephen. This window is near the site of the former chapel dedicated to that saint. The arms of Salway ( sable, a saltire engrailed or) are featured in the tracery.
St Matthew	Surbiton Surrey	1921	Three-light window depicts the "Nativity".
St Christopher	Haslemere, Surrey		For this church Davis executed the reredos, an egg tempera triptych depicting The Company of Saints which had been displayed at the Arts and Crafts Exhibition of 1912. Eight painted panels of saints, to a design by Louis Davis, are attached below the triptych.
Cheltenham College Chapel	Cheltenham	1919 and 1920	Working through James Powell and Sons, Davis completed two windows for the South side of the Chapel both serving as memorials to Old Cheltonians who had been killed in the First World War. The first was Norman Harry Coghill and the second Harold Rolleston Stables. The first window, that towards the altar, is called the "Merciful", and has as its central picture a powerful representation of God's mercy- the Ark of the Covenant floats beneath a rainbow on a wonderful blue-green sea. On either side of this we see David sparing the sleeping Saul and a depiction of the Parable of the Good Samaritan. Below, and from left to right, we have a personification of Mercy, falling like rain onto a flock of sheep, Orlando, who saved his brother who had wronged him, Prospero, who had spared his enemies when they were at his mercy and finally the knight from a Florentine legend, who spared his brother's murderer on Good Friday and then, not knowing whether he had done the right thing, knelt down to pray before a crucifix, which promptly leaned over and kissed him, so he knew he was right. The window "Merciful" was ordered from Powell on 17 January 1919. The second window, ordered in June 1920, is called the "Pure in Heart", those who, as is said in the Beatitudes, will see God. At the top is Joseph interpreting Potiphar's dream, and Isaiah with the long road stretching behind him. Their vision of God's majesty is seen in two angels with startingly ruby wings. Beneath them are Parsifal, Joan of Arc, a depiction of Purity and finally Sir Galahad. There was a third window commissioned through James Powell and Sons, this the window called "Fortitude". This window was ordered from Powells on 24 March 1924 but by then, Louis Davis was no longer doing work for them and it was Sir James Hogan, Powell's chief designer who designed this window.
All Saints Episcopal Church	St Andrews	1913 and 1923	There are two windows by Louis Davis in this church both through James Powell & Son. The East window, above the high altar, dates from 1913 and shows the Annunication in the left-hand light and the Nativity in the right. The other is the small west window in the north aisle and is titled " Christus Regnabit". This window dates to 1923 and is in the Waterhouse-built part of the church.
St Mary with St Andrew	Rockbeare, Devon	1928	Davis designed a window for this church through Powell & Son. Window by Davis in this church is inscribed "In loving remembrance of Catherine Bolitho born 4th May 1856 died 22nd Jan 1922. This window was given by her children." Image in gallery below shown courtesy Heather May.
St John's Kirk	Perth	1932	This church is rich in stained glass, with much of Douglas Strachan's work in evidence. Davis completed a single light window depicting scenes from the life of King David for the South Nave Aisle. This window was commissioned through James Powell and Sons. It was described in the book "Perth and Kinross" part of the "Buildings of Scotland" series as "a well coloured but sentimental window". The window is known as the Neil Gow Stained Glass Window given that it was the gift of Neil Gow, of Perth, in memory of his parents.
St Lawrence	Waltham St Lawrence, Berkshire	1934	Davis completed a two-light window for this church. The left-hand light depicts the Annunciation and in the right-hand light an Angel lifts a chalice up to Heaven. The window is inscribed "To the Glory of God and in loving memory of Clementina Caroline Lockett Burkill, who died 13 September 1932, aged 80 years". Mrs Burkill was the widow of Albert Robson Burkill, who died 29 November 1913. He had served as a lieutenant in the Essex Militia Rifles in the 1860s and then went into Far East trading. The Burkill family lived at "Paradise", a large house at Paradise Corner, Waltham St. Lawrence. The church also has an Art Nouveau style window, artist unknown, this commemorating Mr. Burkill. Image in gallery below shown courtesy Andrew Hyde.
United Reformed Church	Streatham, Inner London	1935	Davis' three-light window depicts Balzaleel, Solomon and Hiram. It was given in memory of James Carmichael.
St. Peter's Church	Croydon Surrey	1937	Through James Powell & Son, Davis completed the central light of three in this church. Another window with the theme "Noli me Tangere"
All Saints	Longstanton, Cambridgeshire	1938	Three-light window at the East end of the North Aisle depicts Faith, Hope and Charity. Davis' depiction of "Hope" is almost identical to an earlier window at St Silas the Martyr in Kentish Town.
St George's Anglican Church	Hamilton, Ontario, Canada		Davis designed a memorial window in the West wall of the St George's Nave.
Christ Church	Holloway Derbyshire	1919	The glass in the East window (1919) is by Davis.

== List of other forms of works ==
- For All Saints Church in West Lavington, Wiltshire, Davis executed a painting entitled "Virgin and Child" in 1910.
- In 1907, Davis also produced a portfolio of ten drawings, mostly cartoons for glasswork . These include a Study of the head of Beryl; Summer and hermonths, a study prepared for Welbeck Abbey; Virgin and child with butterflies; The Angel of the Christmas tree and Angel of the Rose, three drawings made for decoration in the oratory of Adeline, Duchess of Bedford; a Study of Drapery – The dream of St Martin; The Island of the Hart, a drawing for decoration in the Marquis of Londonderry's private chapel at Wynyard Park, County Durham; Child Angel with Dove, a study for a window at St Patrick's Cathedral, Dublin; The dream of St Anselm and Weeping Angel, the latter designed for a painting on the decorated panels above the back of the altar, at the former church of All Hallows in Southwark.
- In 1952, Edith Davis, Louis' wife, presented a panel featuring St Nicholas to Abingdon Chapel, this as a memorial to her late husband. The panel is the artist's copy of his panel, coloured in a cold dark blue, but relieved by some gold, and brown, appropriately called the North Wind. It came from Davis's series of great choir windows in the Lady Chapel of Dunblane Abbey illustrating the Benedicite. The Abingdon panel is likely to have been Davis's copy of the Dunblane window which he made for the 1924 British Empire Exhibition at Wembley. To remember this local artist, Abingdon School currently awards Louis Davis art exhibitions and scholarships.
- In Leamington Spa Art Gallery and Museum is a Davis watercolour "Study for an Altarpiece."
- At Holyrood House there is a stained glass panel by Davis depicting St Margaret of Scotland, which is displayed in the newly restored oak-panelled oratory or prayer niche of Mary, Queen of Scots. In Mary's time, a window in this recess looked down directly onto the west entrance of Holyrood Abbey Church. The original ceiling panel of this small recess is decorated with the Cross of St Andrew encircled by a Royal Crown. In Davis' design, St Margaret (c.1046–93) stands in a colourful, flower-filled meadow, with her husband, Malcolm III, behind her. She holds a scroll bearing a plan of Dunfermline Abbey, where their marriage took place in 1070. It was St Margaret's son, David I, who founded the Abbey at Holyrood in 1128. This panel of St Margaret had been presented by the Duke of Atholl to King George V in 1927, in gratitude for the King's support in establishing the Scottish National War Memorial at Edinburgh Castle in 1927.
- In the Stained Glass Museum at Ely is a design for a three light stained glass window for St Matthew's Church, Surbiton. The centre light shows the Virgin Mary and the Jesus Child. The outer lights shows angels, one holds a spear pointed at the large serpent which appears at the bottom of the three lights. This was executed in around 1920.
- At St John the Baptist's Chapel in Matlock Bath, there is a Davis stained glass window at the east end. The chapel was built in 1897 for Mrs Louisa Sophia Harris and was designed by Guy Dawber. Since being declared redundant, in 2002 the chapel was taken into the care of the charity, the Friends of Friendless Churches.
- In Stanmore Hall, near Harrow, William Knox D'Arcy (1849–1917), a great supporter of the Arts and Crafts movement, had some stained glass designed by Davis.

== Gallery ==
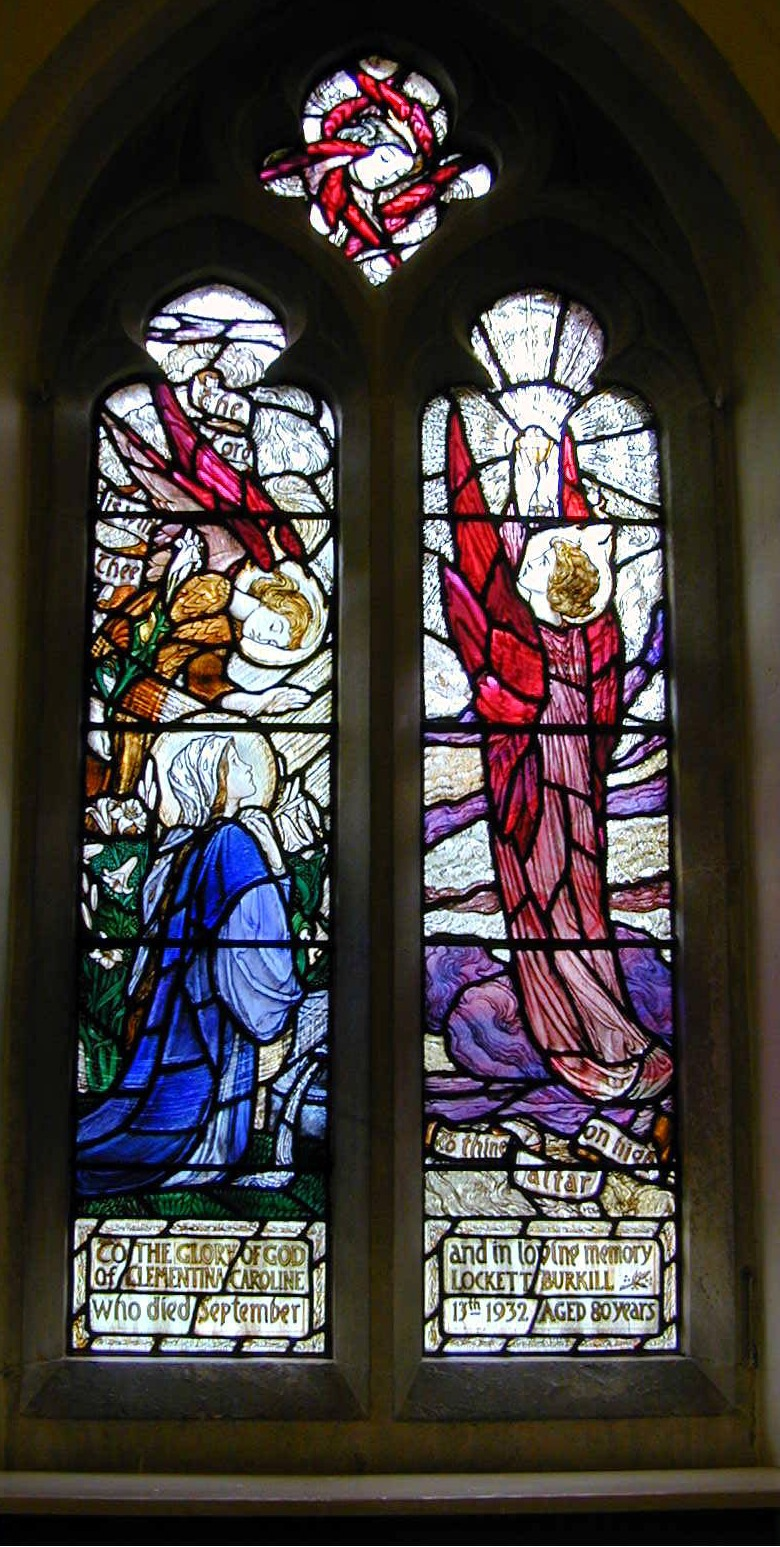
Davis window in St Lawrence church Waltham St Lawrence. Berkshire

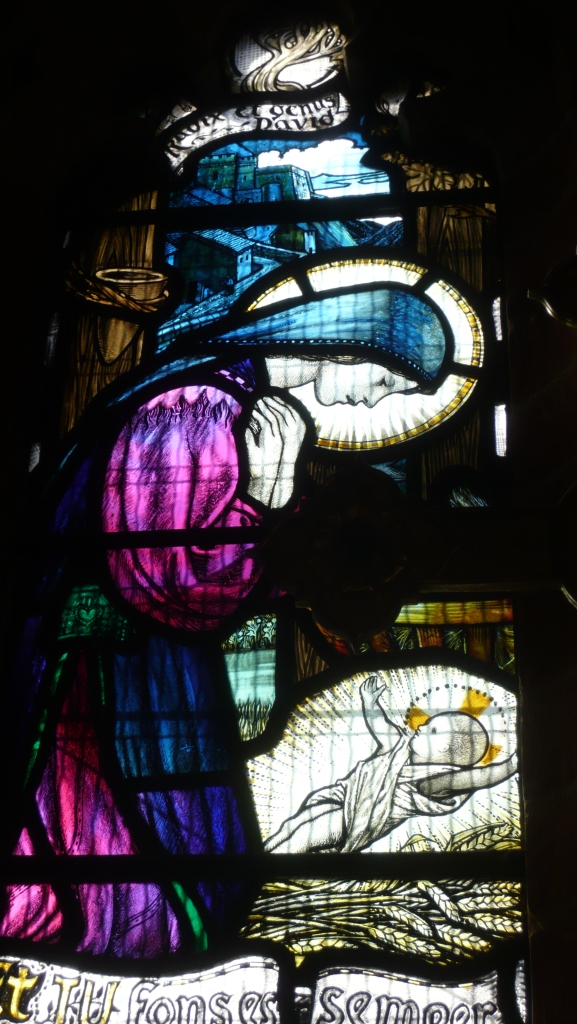
Left hand light of window St John's Seven Kings.

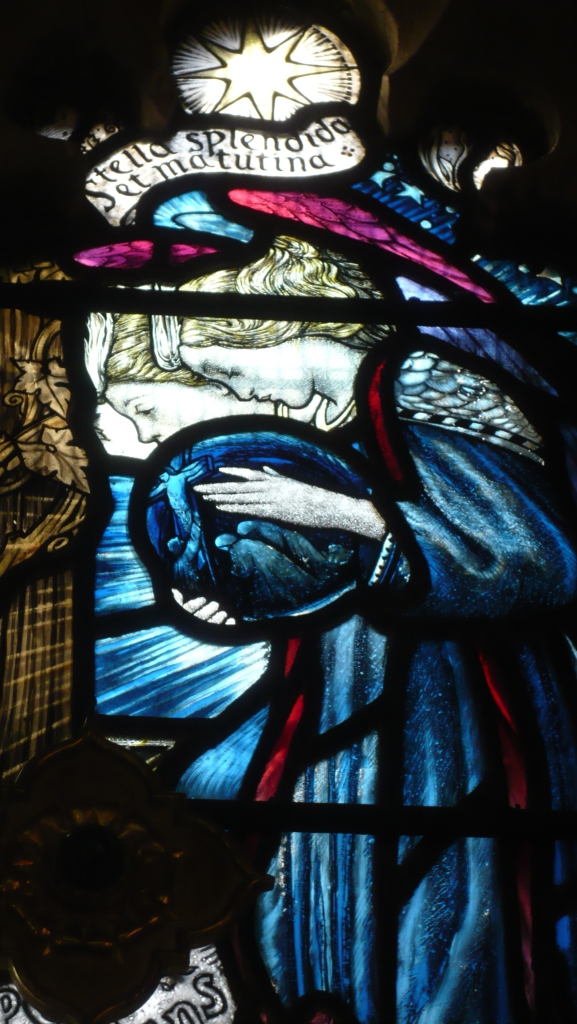
Right hand light of window St John's Seven Kings.

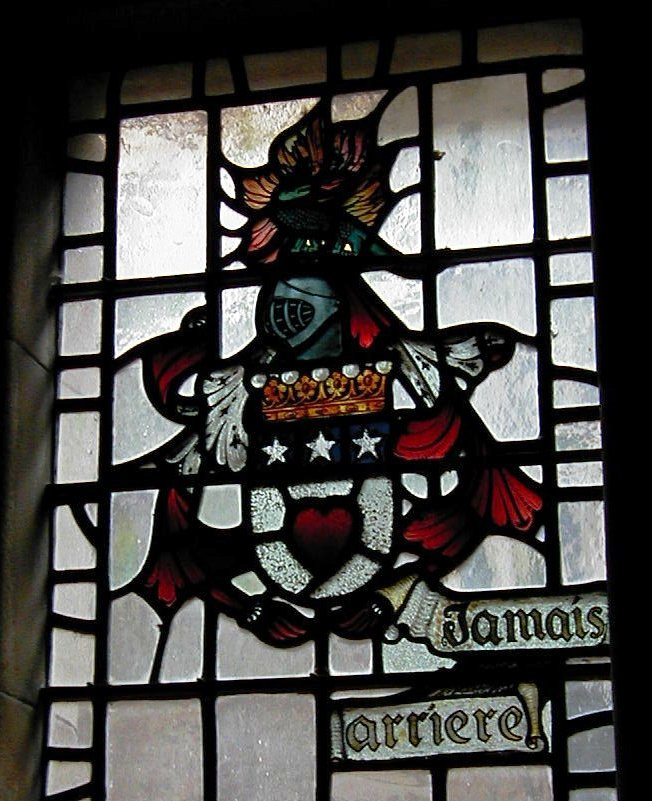
One of windows featuring Coats of Arms at Ardkinglas

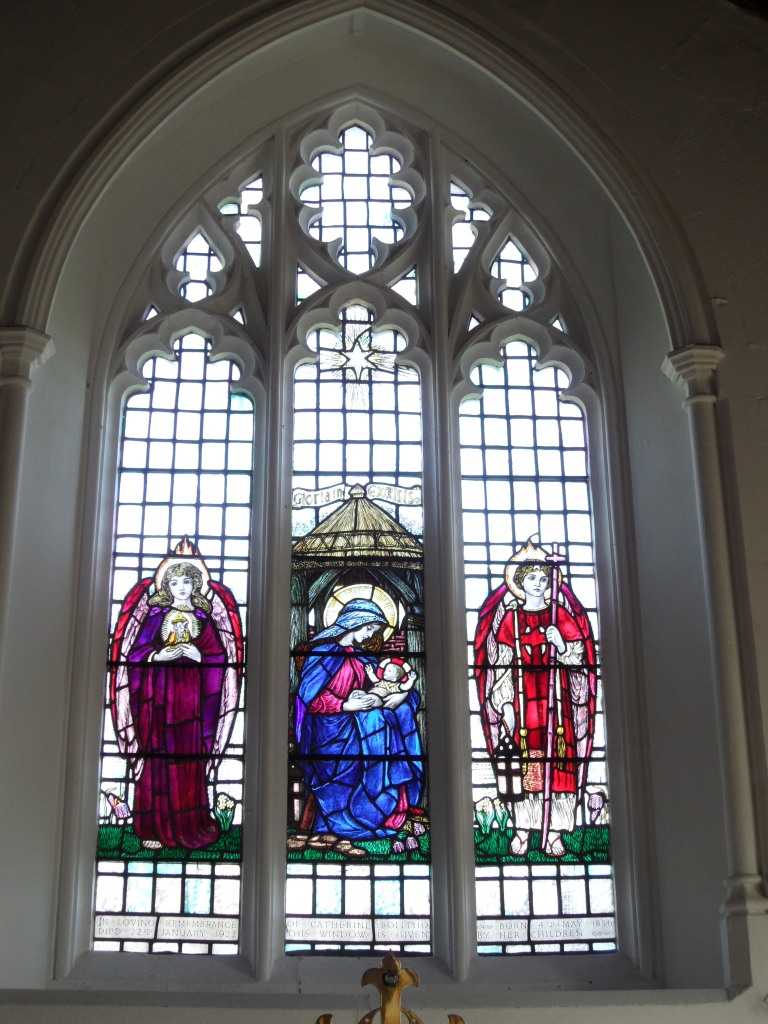
Window in St Mary's Rockbeare.Devon.

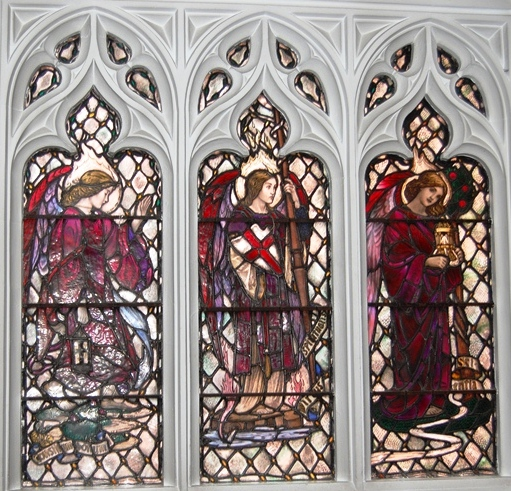
Window at Heathfield School Chapel

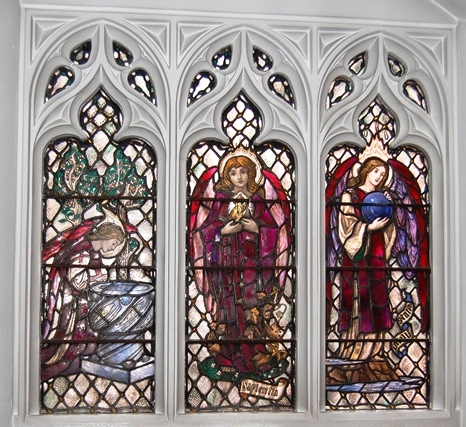
Window at Heathfield School Chapel

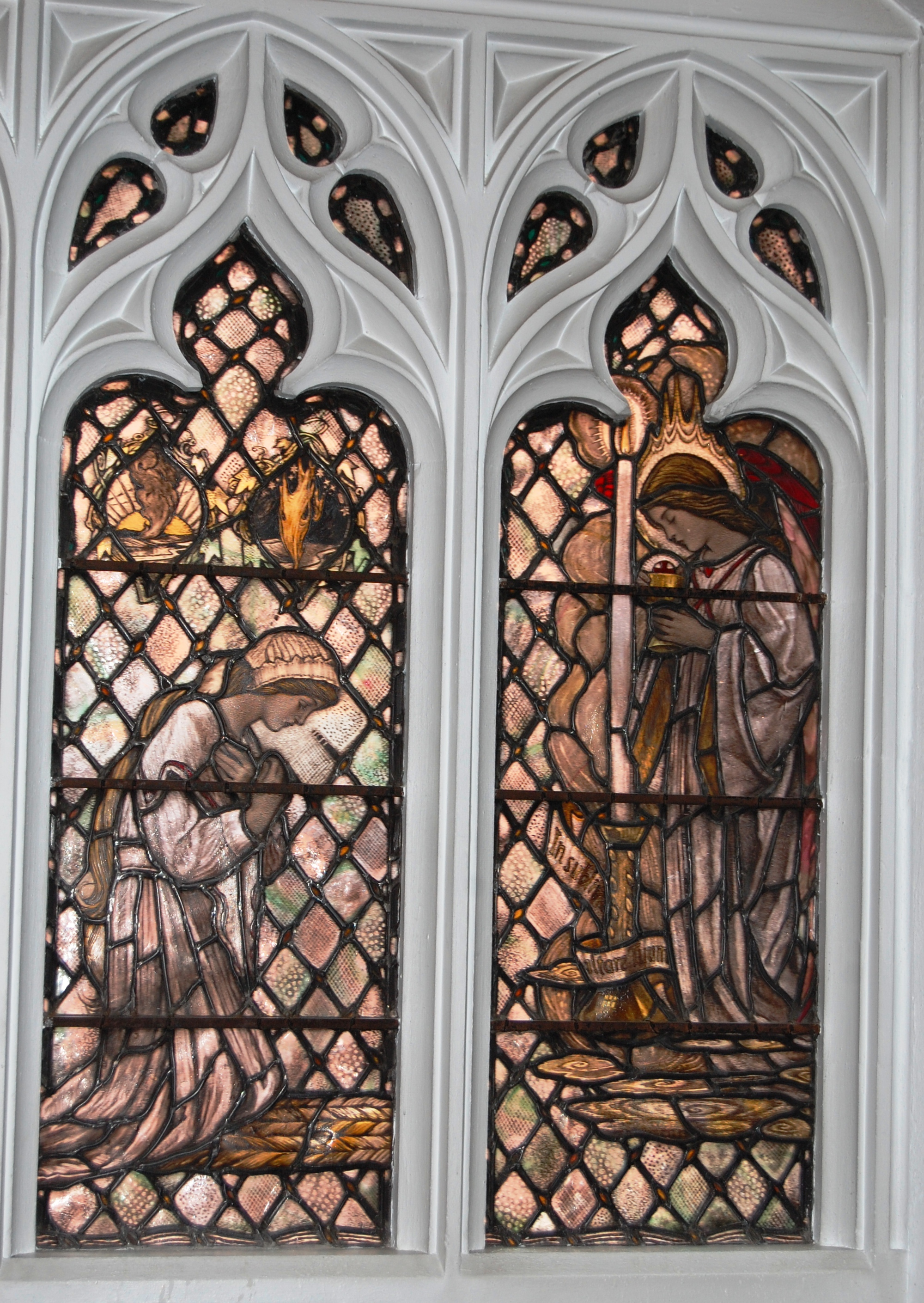
Window at Heathfield School Chapel

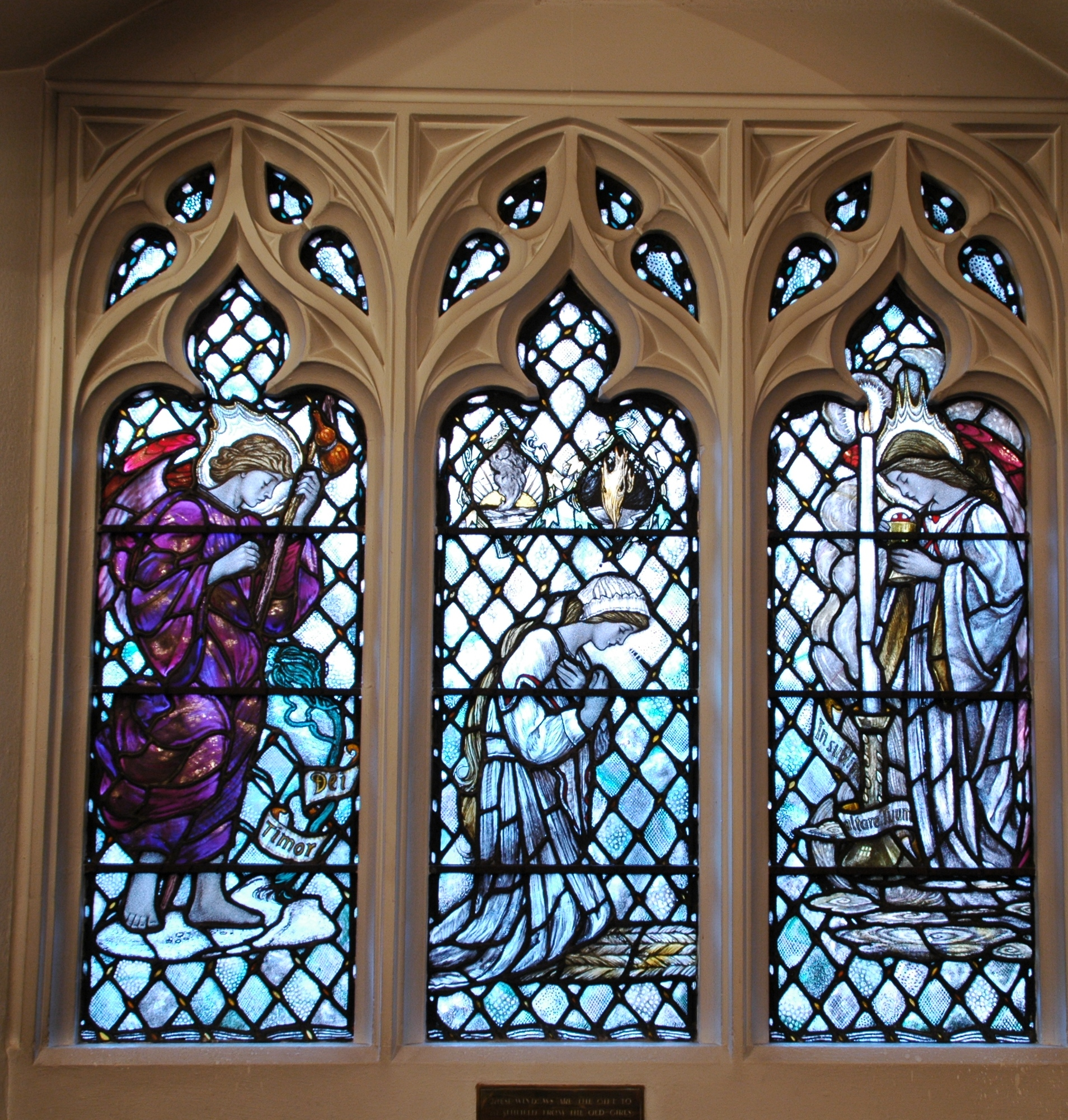
Window at Heathfield School Chapel

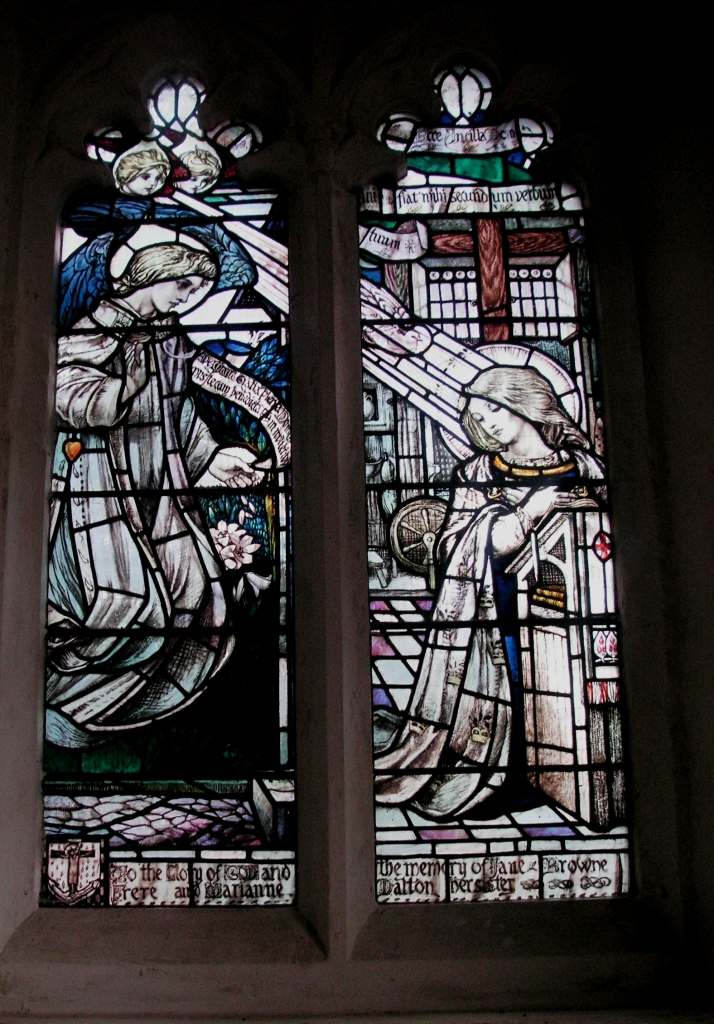
Window in St Mary the Virgin, Kelveden, Essex.
