= St Michael and All Angels Church, Southwick =

St Michael and All Angels Church
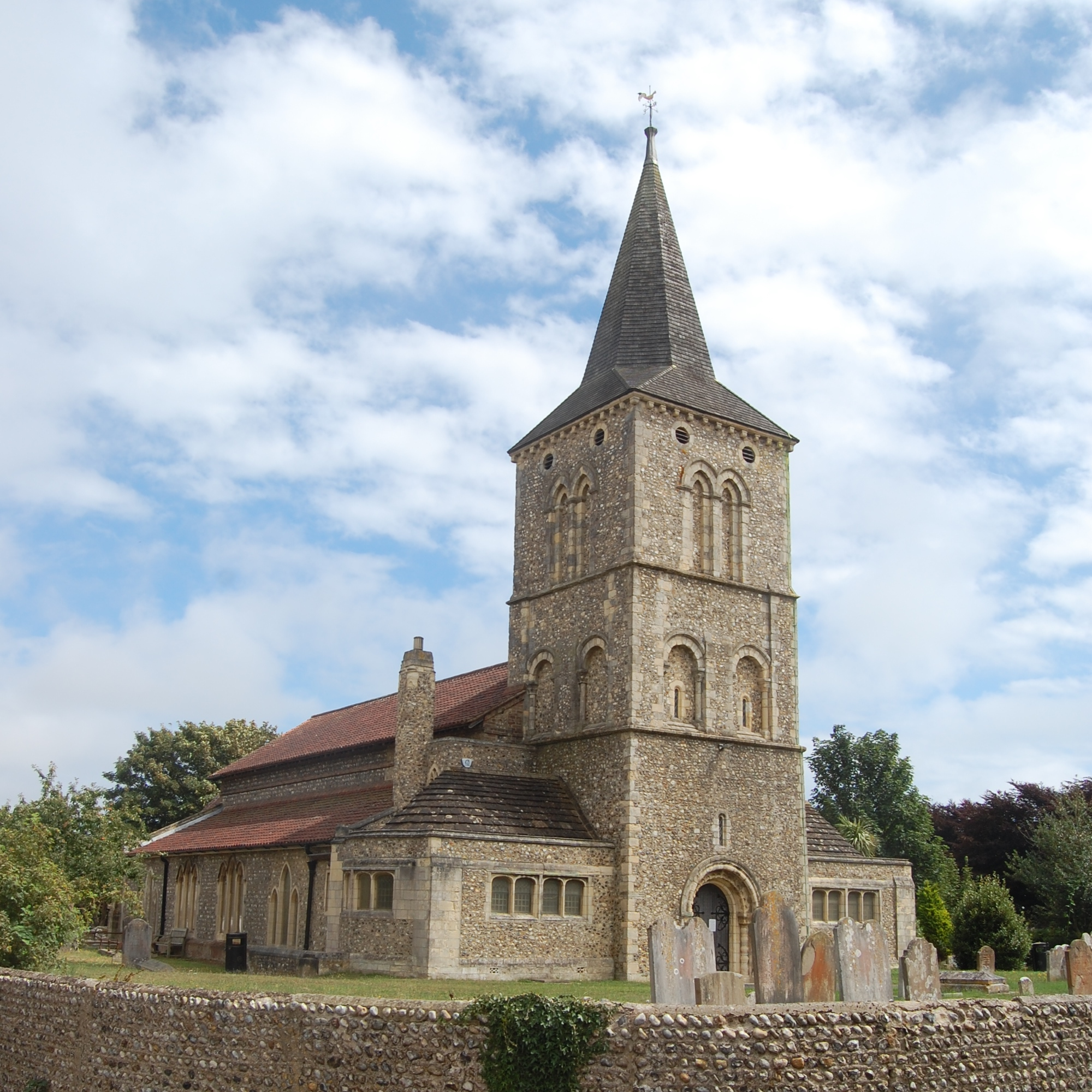
- The church from the southeast
- St Michael and All Angels Church
- 50.8349°N 0.2413°W
- Location: Church Lane, Southwick, West Sussex
- Country: England
- Denomination: Church of England

History
- Former name: St Margaret's Church
- Status: Parish church
- Founded: By 11th century
- Dedication: Michael the Archangel
- Dedicated: 18th century

Architecture
- Functional status: Active
- Heritage designation: Grade II*
- Designated: 19 July 1950

Administration
- Province: Canterbury
- Diocese: Chichester
- Archdeaconry: Chichester
- Deanery: Rural Deanery of Hove
- Parish: Southwick, St Michael and All Angels

Clergy
- Rector: Jonathan French

St Michael and All Angels Church is an Anglican church in the town of Southwick in the English district of Adur. It was rebuilt in the 12th and 13th centuries, with some Anglo-Saxon era structural work remaining; a church may have existed on the site as early as the 10th century—before the ancient settlement of Southwick took that name. The church, which has been damaged by fire and bombing, is the area's parish church. English Heritage has listed it at Grade II* for its architectural and historical importance.

== History ==
The Romans settled in the area that became Southwick: a large villa was in use for nearly 300 years until the 4th century, and no more development took place until the late Saxon era. The earliest record of the name "Southwick" came in 1073, when it was part of the large manor of Kingston Buci estate to the west. This covered several nearby settlements as well as the village of Kingston Buci, and may have been founded as a Celtic estate.

A church from earlier in the Saxon era—probably a wooden structure—stood on the site of the present building earlier in the Saxon era, but by the time of the Domesday survey in 1086 a stone structure was in place. Southwick was not identified as a separate entity in the Domesday Book, and the church was almost certainly controlled by St Julian's Church in Kingston Buci. In the late 12th century or 1225 (sources differ), the advowson was conveyed to the Knights Templar, who by this time were also patrons of the Church of St Mary the Blessed Virgin in nearby Sompting. It was then transferred to another religious order, the Knights Hospitaller, in around 1365 before becoming Crown property after the Dissolution of the Monasteries in the 16th century.

As built in the 11th century, the church had a nave, chancel and tower at the west end. The lowest level of the tower, incorporating the entrance doorway, remains from that era. All three stages of the tower were originally thought to have been Saxon, but later analysis has determined that the middle and upper stages date from the late 12th or early 13th century.

Around the same time, the rest of the church was rebuilt. The nave was renewed and had an aisle and chapel added on the south side, and the chancel was remodelled twice (first in about 1130, and again in the 13th century when lancet windows were added). A chancel arch and wooden chancel screen followed in the 14th century. A porch was in place in the early 17th century, and may have replaced the aisle and chapel on that side.

A fire destroyed the nave and roof in 1830, although the chancel and tower were undamaged. Architect John Garrett designed a new four-bay nave with north and south aisles in a lean-to style, rounded arches and lancet windows in groups of three. A vestry and a replacement for the old south chapel were built later in the 19th century.

The churchyard was extended in the late 19th century, and a lychgate was added in 1908.

The church was hit by a bomb during a Second World War bombing raid on 21 February 1941. Although it did not explode, it travelled through the tower and wrecked it. A bomb disposal unit failed to find the bomb despite extensive digging, and ordered the tower to be demolished because it was structurally unsound and they needed to widen their search area. Because of the tower's historical and architectural value, it was taken down stone by stone and stored so it could be restored and re-erected later. In January 1943, two years after the bombing, the bomb disposal team found the device embedded under the churchyard by the outside wall of the north aisle. It was removed, defused and put on display inside the church for a time.

After the war ended, the War Damage Commission paid for the tower to be rebuilt. The individually numbered stones and timbers were retrieved, and in 1949 John Denman executed a precise rebuilding of all three stages and the broached spire. He also built vestries on both sides.

== Architecture ==
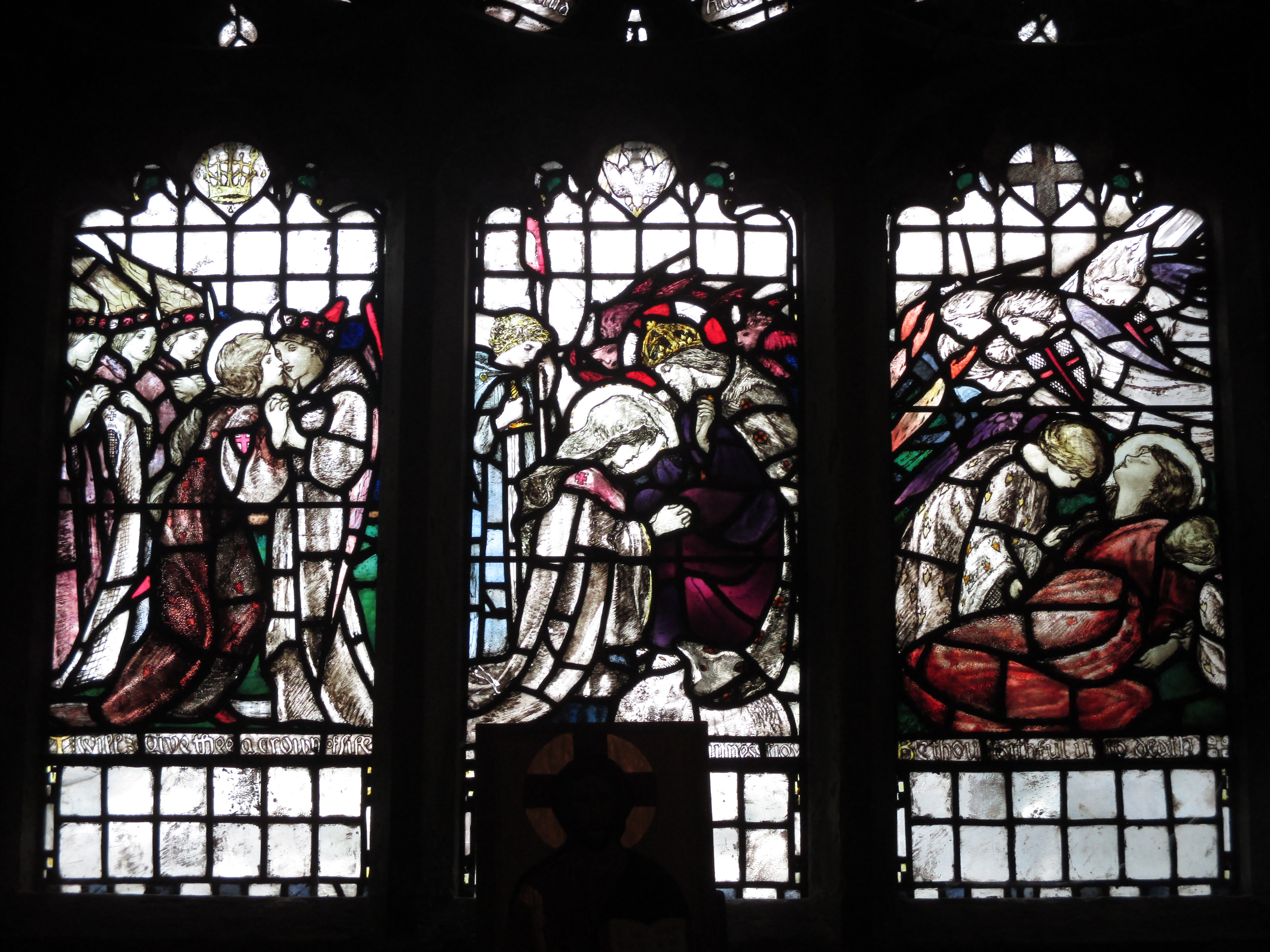
The east window of the north aisle, designed by Louis Davis

St Michael and All Angels Church is a flint-built structure with dressings of stone. Most of the flint has been renewed, although there is still some 11th-century work around the entrance door. The roof is laid with a combination of flat tiles and pantiles.

The three-stage tower, topped with its shingled spire, stands at the west end between two vestries with rounded walls. The entrance is in the lowest stage of the tower; above it the roofline of the original 11th-century church can be discerned. Inside is the nave with its north and south aisles and south chapel (now used to house the organ), and the chancel with a restored chancel arch (originally built in the Norman era using clunch, a common building material in Sussex). In the north wall of the chancel, a 14th-century aumbry can be discerned.

The tower has rounded-headed windows in its middle stage and tall, much narrower rounded lancets in the upper stage. The lancet windows in the chancel, inserted in the 13th century, underwent 19th-century restoration and have stained glass by Charles Eamer Kempe. The nave also has lancets, put in during the 1835 rebuilding, and several windows in the aisles were installed as memorials during the Victorian era. The east window is contemporary, and its stained glass may be by the Clayton and Bell firm. Ken Adams of the Cox & Barnard firm of Hove designed a memorial window for the north aisle in about 1950, showing the Presentation of Jesus at the Temple.

Internal fittings include an elaborately carved pulpit with some early 17th-century panels, an organ restored in the mid-1970s and a substantial square font which is believed to date from the 13th century.

== Status ==
St Michael and All Angels Church was listed at Grade II* by English Heritage on 19 July 1950. Such buildings are defined as being "particularly important ... [and] of more than special interest".

== See also ==
- List of places of worship in Adur
