= Louis Davis (painter) =

English painter

- Born: 28 May 1860; Abingdon, Oxfordshire
- Died: 1941 (aged 80–81)
- Education: Christopher Whall
- Known for: Illustrator, water colourist, stained glass artist
- Notable work: Works of Louis Davis
- Movement: Pre-Raphaelite, Arts and Crafts Movement
- Spouse: Edith Webster

Louis Davis (May 1860 – 1941) was an English watercolourist, book illustrator and stained-glass artist. He was active in the Arts and Crafts Movement, and Nikolaus Pevsner referred to him as the last of the Pre-Raphaelites.

== Personal life ==
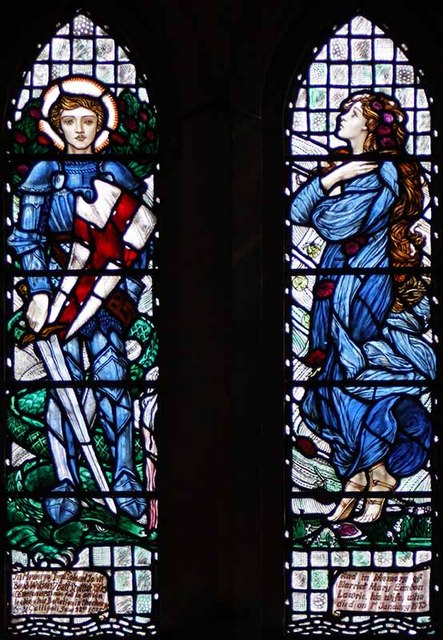
Louis Davis, stained glass window in Dunblane Cathedral

Louis Davis was born on 28 May 1860 and raised in Abingdon, Oxfordshire on East St Helen Street. He was the son of Marianne and Gabriel Davis. His mother, also known as Mary Ann, was from Ewelme, Oxfordshire. His father was a manufacturer, with an interest in the Davis Engineering and Launch Building Company, which built and refurbished boats, barges and canals. Gabriel Davis was also a grain, alcohol and coal merchant. Louis Davis had two older brothers, Arthur and David, and a younger brother named Oliver.

Davis married the much younger Edith Jane Webster in 1901 in Tewkesbury, Gloucestershire. Due to the similarity between the faces of women in his works and that of a picture of Edith, it is probable that she was his model for much of his glass work. The couple had no children, but Edith's sister, Ethel, lived with the couple and was a companion and housekeeper for a period of time.

Edith and Louis were both injured in an accidental gas fire and the resulting fumes in 1915. Davis seemed to have suffered a stroke, lost his ability to speak, and occasionally required a wheelchair for mobility. Edith fully recovered from the incident.

Davis died in 1941, after which Edith sold their home and studio and returned to East Anglia where she was raised. She died in the late 1970s.

== Education ==
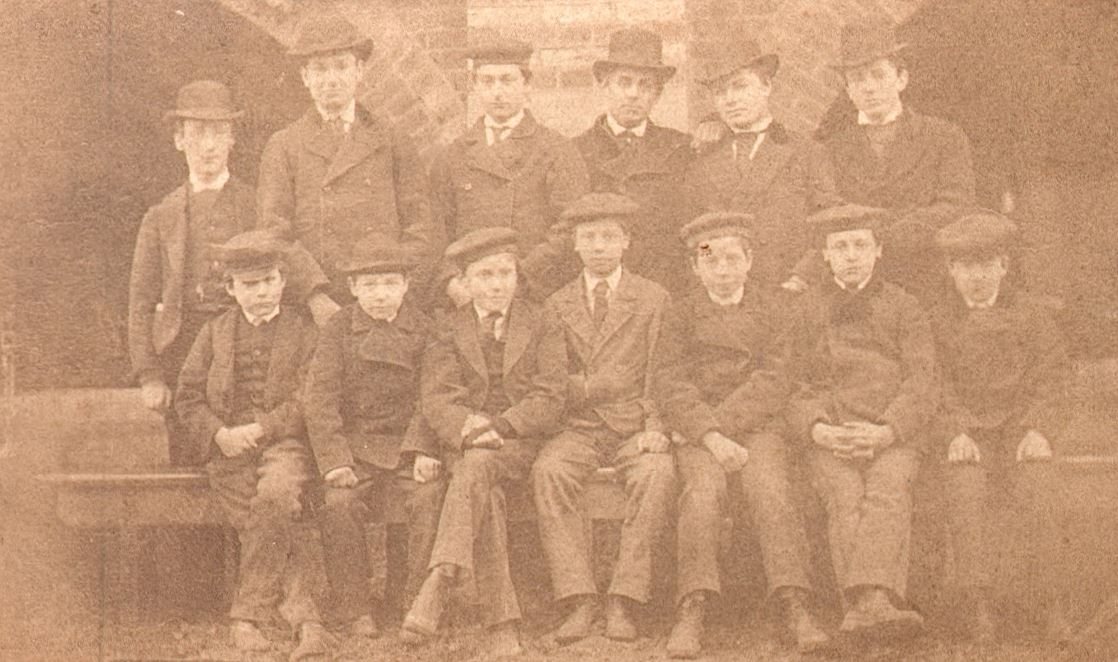
1871 Abingdon School day boys, Davis sitting front row, second left

Davis was educated at Abingdon School from 1870 to 1875. Recognised as talented, he was awarded a foundation scholarship based upon his artistic skill in 1871.

In 1891 he became a student of the glass artist, Christopher Whall, at his combined home and studio in Dorking. One of Whall's first students, Davis lived with his mentor's family for a time. Davis assisted Whall on one of the windows commissioned for St Mary's Church in Stamford, Lincolnshire.

== Career ==
Davis knew William Morris, Edward Burne-Jones, and Dante Gabriel Rossetti. He was a member of the Art Workers Guild and the Society of Painters in Tempera.

=== Illustrator and painter ===
His first artistic fields starting around 1886 were illustration, such as his work for the English Illustrated Magazine, and watercolours. His work was exhibited often, but he had an increasing interest in stained-glass work and by 1911 worked exclusively with glass.

=== Stained glass ===
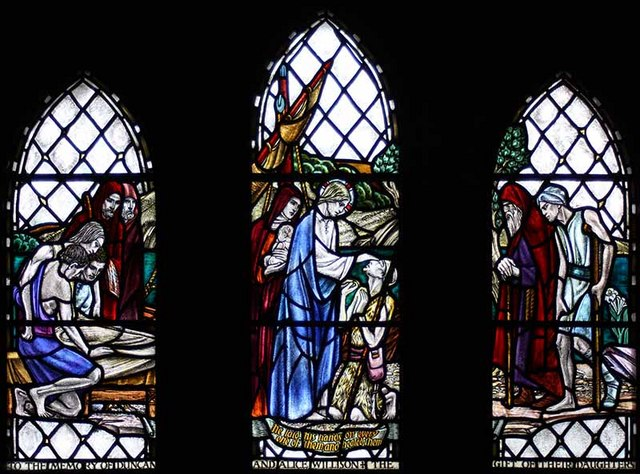
Louis Davis, window at Dunblane Cathedral

A few years after having worked with Christopher Wall, Davis worked in London with Mary Lowndes and Alfred J. Drury at Lowndes and Drury. He worked first at their premises in Chelsea, then from 1906 at their Glass House studio in Fulham. When the volume of work that Davis commissioned exceeded his ability to have the works made, he contracted with the London-based James Powell & Sons to make the works, particularly relying on principal glass-painter Thomas Cowell to interpret and execute the designs. Davis then maintained his own studio at Ewelme Cottage, Pinner.

Davis photographed images for Whall's 1905 book, Stained Glass Work, and his friends Edward Woore and Karl Parsons made illustrations for the book.

Having suffered from the accidental fire and resulting fumes in 1915, Davis used or reworked previous designs with the assistance of Thomas Cowell from James Powell & Sons for his commissions. Some of his post-1918 work included a Cheltenham College World War I memorial window and, in Rockbeare in Devon, a window for St Mary's Church.

=== Works ===
Notable works by Davis include:

Church	Location	Date(s)	Subject and notes
St John the Baptist's Chapel	Matlock Bath, Derbyshire	1897	Sacrament of Baptism, East Window
Paisley Abbey	Paisley, Renfrewshire	1908	Benedictine Window
St Colmon Parish Church	Colmonell, Ayrshire	1910	St Margaret of Scotland
Dunblane Cathedral	Dunblane, Perthshire	1915	Benedictine Windows

== Legacy ==
For his use of vibrant colours, Nikolaus Pevsner referred to Davis as the last of the Pre-Raphaelites. In 1935 for a review of his exhibit in London, the Oxford Mail said that: "Mr Davis, who was born at Abingdon, is one of the last remaining Pre-Raphaelites. He knew Sir Edward Burne-Jones, William Morris, Dante Gabriel Rossetti and others."

The Abingdon Parish Magazine wrote in their obituary of him: "His colour and design satisfy the sense of beauty, and the actual craftsmanship will always be a wonder to those who understand the art of glass-making."

In their obituary of Davis, The Times wrote: "Mr Davis may be said to have inherited the side of the pre-Raphaelite movement which was concerned with medieval glamour and Celtic twilight rather than with the method of fidelity to nature... Davis was so thoroughly imbued with the spirit of his school that he used all its devices and mannerisms with an easy, natural skill, and the sentiment of his pictures never seemed forced or affected..."

== See also ==
- List of Old Abingdonians
