= Carleton Castle =

Castle in South Ayrshire, Scotland

- Lendalfoot, South Ayrshire, Scotland; UK grid reference NX 13302 89521
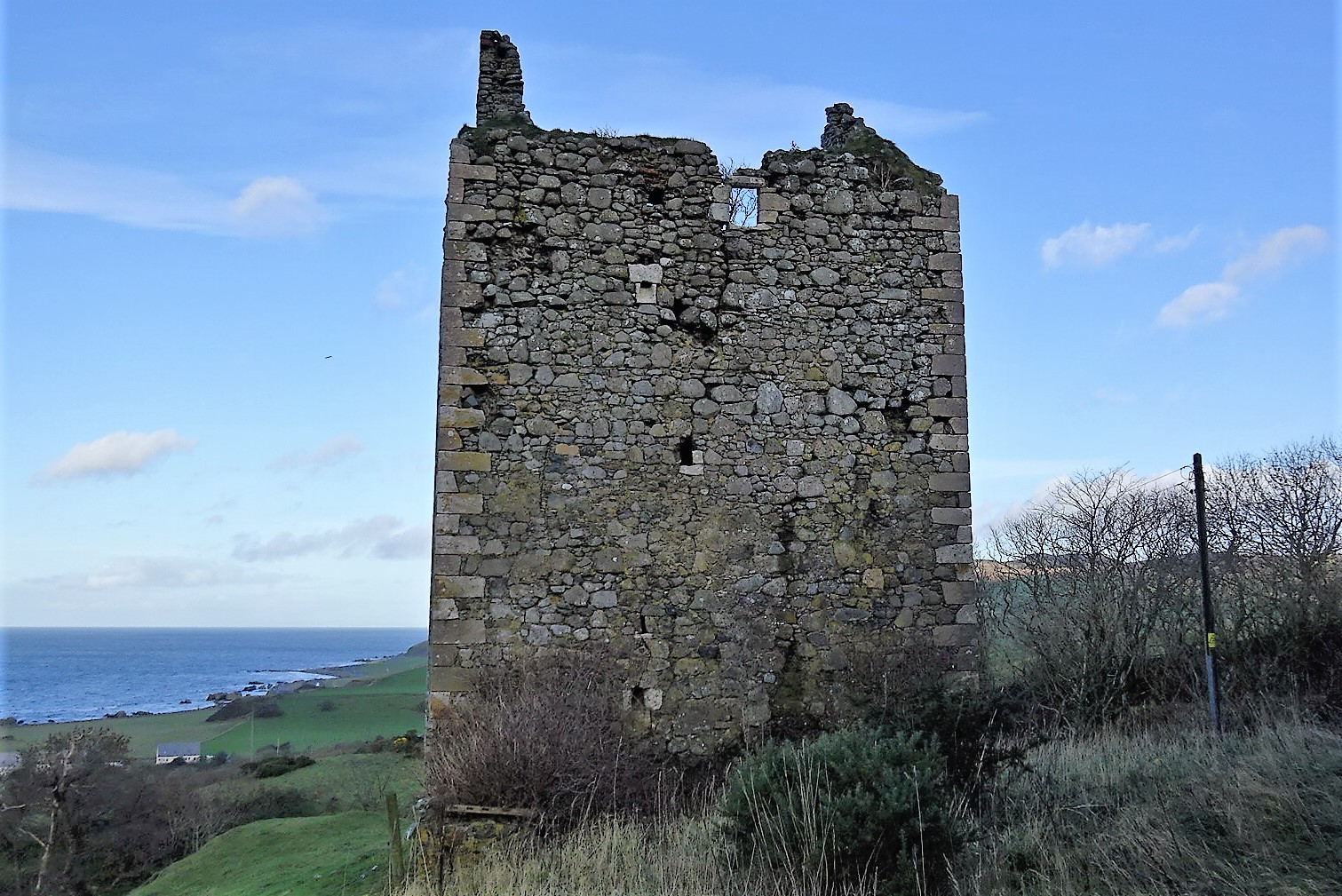
- Remnants of the castle's keep

Site information
- Type: A tower castle and barmakin
- Owner: Little Carleton Farm
- Open to the public: No
- Condition: A ruin

Location
- Carleton Castle
- Coordinates: 55.1647°N 4.9325°W

Site history
- Built: 15th century
- Built by: Cathcarts of Killochan
- In use: 15th to early 18th century
- Materials: Stone

The ruins of the five storey high 15th century Carleton Castle lie in a prominent position above the village of Lendalfoot located on Carleton Bay, parish of Colmonell in the old district of Carrick, now South Ayrshire, about 6 miles (9.7 Km) south of Girvan, Scotland.

== Carleton Castle and Little Carleton Fort or Motte ==
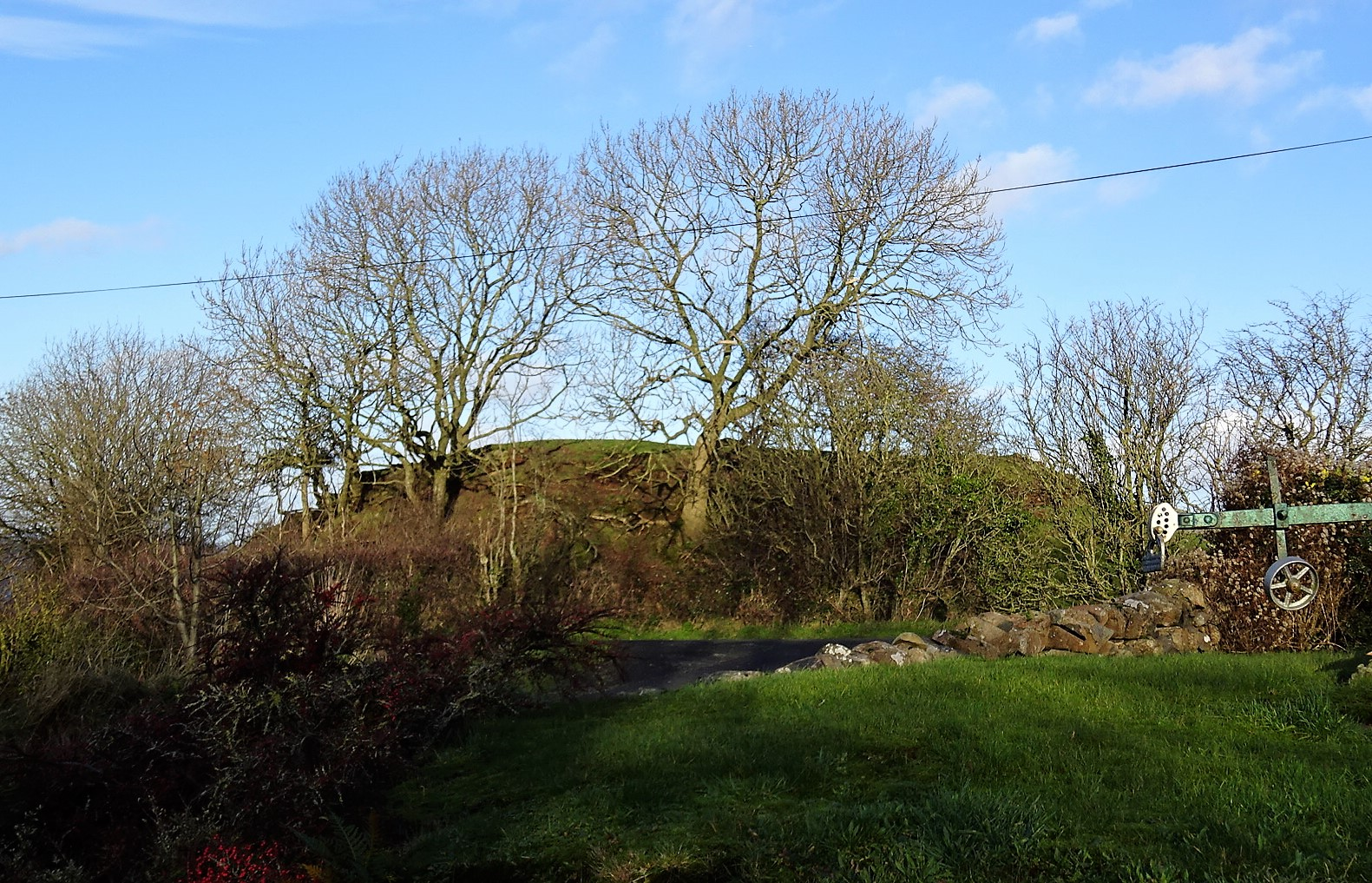
The Little Carleton Motte.

Carleton Castle is a Category B Listed Building of the 15th-century five-storey tower and barmakin, once held by the Cathcarts of Killochan that stands overlooking the village close to the Games Loup cliffs. The long abandoned tower ruins still stand, minus the parapet and a collapsed section of wall that has been partly rebuilt at some more recent stage with internal plastering applied that suggests a later use as a dwelling or store. At the back of the tower pigsties-type ruins survive that were still roofed in the 19th century according to OS maps. This small tower had only one private apartment reached via a stair from a window in the great hall, the entry to the oblong tower itself being originally via a door at first floor level with a wooden ladder or stair. The six-foot-thick (1.8 m) wall at the entrance may have had a stair within it that gave access to the cellar, great hall and a probable kitchen level. In the south-east corner a wheel stair connected the hall to the cellar. A prominent feature on the side facing the farm is a garderobe or privy shute.

The barmakin or walled courtyard existed with towers at the angles on the area between the two relatively deep glens created by small un-named rivulets. The castle guarded and controlled a mountain pass as well as the old road Portpatrick road that then ran along the high ground. The tower had two vaults, one over the great hall and the second over the ground floor. 19th century engravings show that substantially more of the great hall vaulted ceiling survived at that time. Red sandstone appears to have been selectively used as a decorative feature in the upper vault, window arches, etc.

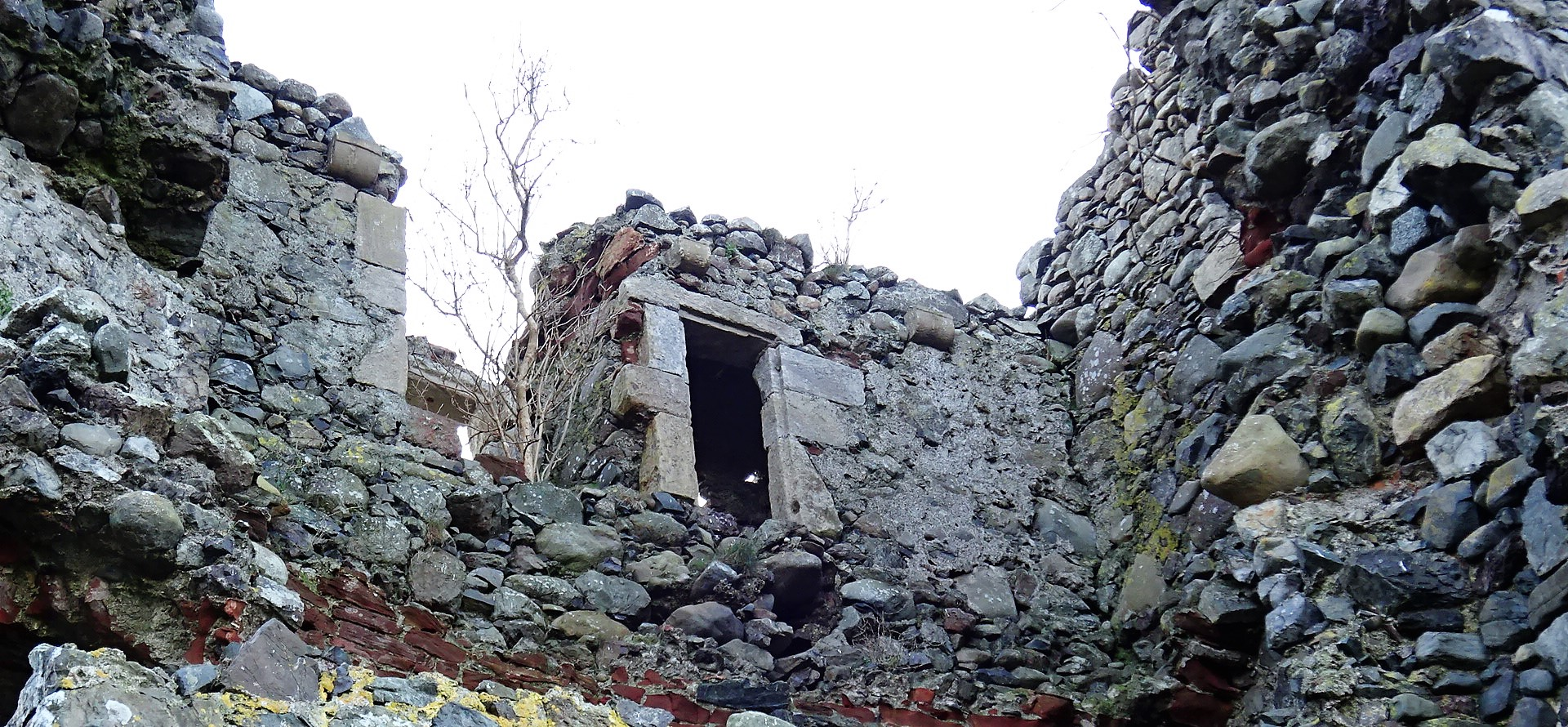
Details of the upper storey of the tower

Blaeu's map of the 1660s shows the castle as intact with a pale or fence on the side of the castle not demarcated by the two deep glens. A Karltoun Mill and Mains are shown, both probably associated with the Cathcarts as lairds, the mains farm being, as was usually the case, set aside for supplying food to the laird, his family and servants. John Adair records the castle in his map of 1685. Herman Moll's map of 1745 records Karleton (sic) and shows the old inland road to Portpatrick running close by. In 1775 Carlton (sic) is shown, not seemingly as a ruin, with the Portpatrick road now following the coastline. The 1775 road map by Taylor and Skinner is the first to clearly record the castle as a ruin although still held by a Cathcart baronet.

Carleton is typical of the other Carrick castles such as Dinvin, Dow Hill, Duniewick. The Cathcarts also held Little Rigend and Camregan castles in East Ayrshire.

=== Little Carleton Motte ===
A substantial 5-metre-high (16 ft) earth mound, 20 metres across, is known as the Little Carleton Fort or Motte with a circular ditch and a once palisaded bank built some centuries prior to the stone castle stands across from Little Carleton Farm, damaged by the construction of the lane to the village. It was also held by the Cathcarts. Standing close to the castle the motte may have served as the moot hill where the laird's barony court met. No place name evidence for a gallows hill has been noted.

Carleton's name may derive from 'carl or churl' the serfs' dwelling, however in the Whithorn Priory records it is recorded as 'Cairiltoun', the 'dwelling of the Cairils' who in 1095 it is said emigrated from County Antrim to Carrick.

=== The legend of Sir John Cathcart and the murdered heiresses ===
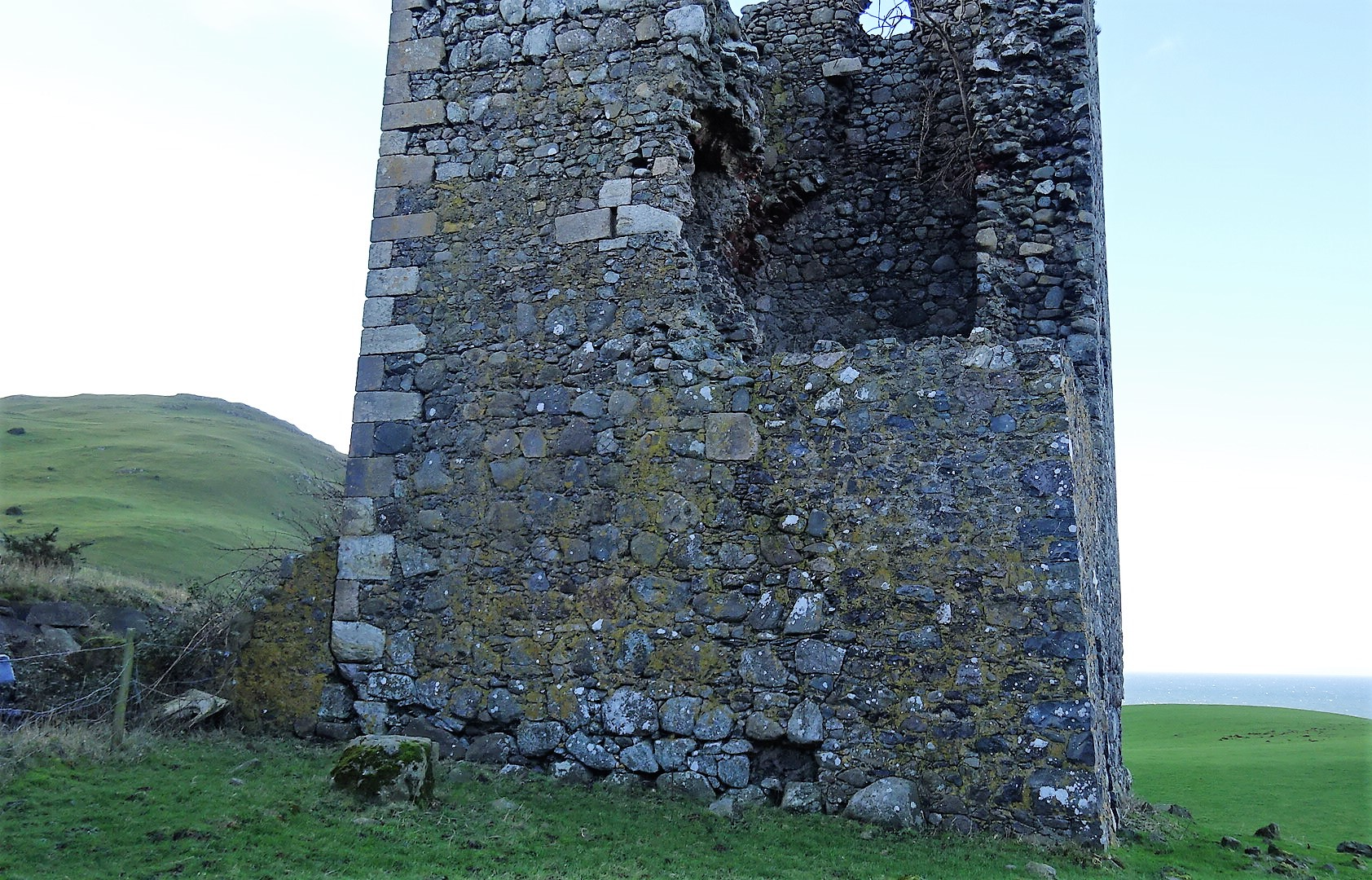
Carleton Castle tower showing the collapsed area and rebuilt section with new entry door.

A legend derived from the ballad May or Mary Culzean exists in several versions in different books. The essence of the story is that Sir John Cathcart of Carleton Castle was in the habit of enriching his estate through marrying heiresses. The steep Games Loup cliffs stand close to the castle and one by one his brides met their end by accidentally falling from the path that ran along the edge.

Mary Kennedy of Culzean was Sir John's ninth heiress bride and one evening whilst walking along the Games Loup her husband informed her that she was to meet her end, but that he would keep her valuable jewel and gold thread enriched clothes. Mary told her husband to act like a gentlemen and to turn his back to preserve her dignity whilst she undressed. Upon his turning she grabbed his arm, spun him around and cast him off the cliff to his death. The ghostly screams of Sir John or his eight murdered wives are said to have been heard emanating from the castle.

== The Cathcart lairds ==
A John Cathcart of Carleton did exist, however he lived at Killochan Castle and it is not known how the legend became attached to his name. John's wife was Helen Wallace and he had at least two sons, John and Robert who were probably born at Killochan Castle. Robert Cathcart is considered to have been the author of the scholarly "Historie of Kennedyis".

Carleton was a possession of the Cathcarts from the time of King Robert I (11 July 1274 – 7 June 1329) and in the 1860s Sir Reginald Cathcart of Killochan had charters dated 1324 and another from King Robert II dated 1386.

== The Lousey or Lausey Knowe ==
On the south side of the Lendal Water stands an artificial mound that is recorded as the Lousey or Lausey Knowe. A local tradition has it that the women of the district used this site to de-louse their children's hair whilst another interpretation is that the name derives from the Scots language for a fire or signal hill, linked to the security and military activities of the castle.

== Carleton Hill ==
Carleton Hill rises to 520 feet or 158 metres from the coastal road and is the site near its summit of earth banks, a probable ancient fort.
