= Old Town Hall, Southwick =

Municipal building in Southwick, West Sussex, England

Old Town Hall
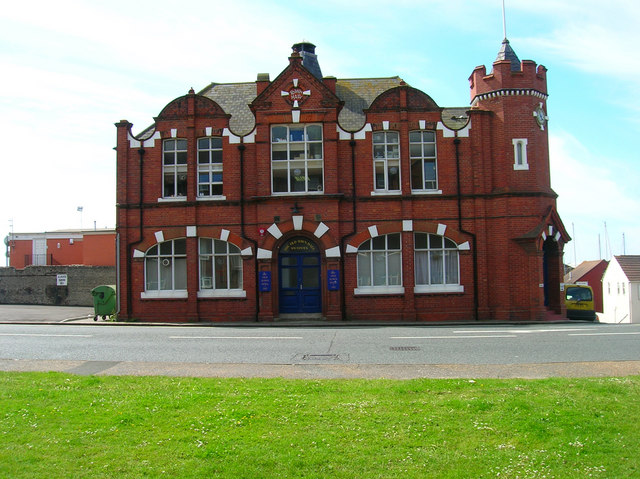
- Old Town Hall, Southwick

- Shown in West Sussex
- 50.8314°N 0.2349°W
- Location: Albion Street, Southwick

History
- Built: 1906

Site notes
- Architect: George Walter Warr
- Architectural style: Baroque Revival style

The Old Town Hall, is a former municipal building in Albion Street in Southwick, West Sussex, England. The building, which is now used as offices, was the meeting place of Southwick Urban District Council.

== History ==
Following significant population growth, largely associated with the seaside tourism industry, the area became an urban district in 1899. The new council decided to commission a town hall for the area: the site they selected was the forecourt of an early 19th century malthouse. The building was designed by the district surveyor, George Walter Warr, in the Baroque Revival style, built in red brick with stone dressings and was completed in 1906.

The design involved an asymmetrical main frontage with three bays facing onto Albion Street; the central bay, which slightly projected forward, featured a doorway flanked by pilasters supporting voussoirs on the ground floor, a casement window on the first floor and a pediment above, with a blind oculus inscribed with the words "Town Hall" in the tympanum. The outer bays were fenestrated by bipartite segmental windows on the ground floor and by bipartite sash windows on the first floor and there were segmental pediments above. On the right of the main section there was a castellated octagonal tower with a pedimented door on the ground floor and lancet windows on the first floor. A clock, which had been donated by a local resident, was installed in the tower. Internally, the principal room was the council chamber.

The town hall was extensively used as a community events venue and regular users included the Southwick Bowling Club who held their first meeting there in February 1910. The thriller film, Ghost Ship, was filmed in the local area in 1952 and included shots of the town hall as well as of Shoreham Harbour canal and the Lady Bee Marina.

The building continued to serve as the meeting place of the urban district council for much of the 20th century but ceased to be the local seat of government when the enlarged Adur District Council was formed in 1974. The positive contribution of the building to the built environment was recognised in 1976, when a small conservation area was created stretching from the town hall in the west to the Schooner Inn in the east. The town hall was subsequently used as a warehouse, before being converted for commercial use as offices. The works to convert the offices involved the creation of a south-facing balcony at the back of the building overlooking the Lady Bee Marina.
