= Lendalfoot =

Village in South Ayrshire, Scotland

Coordinates: 55.1690°N 4.9358°W

Lendalfoot: Scots: Lendalfit
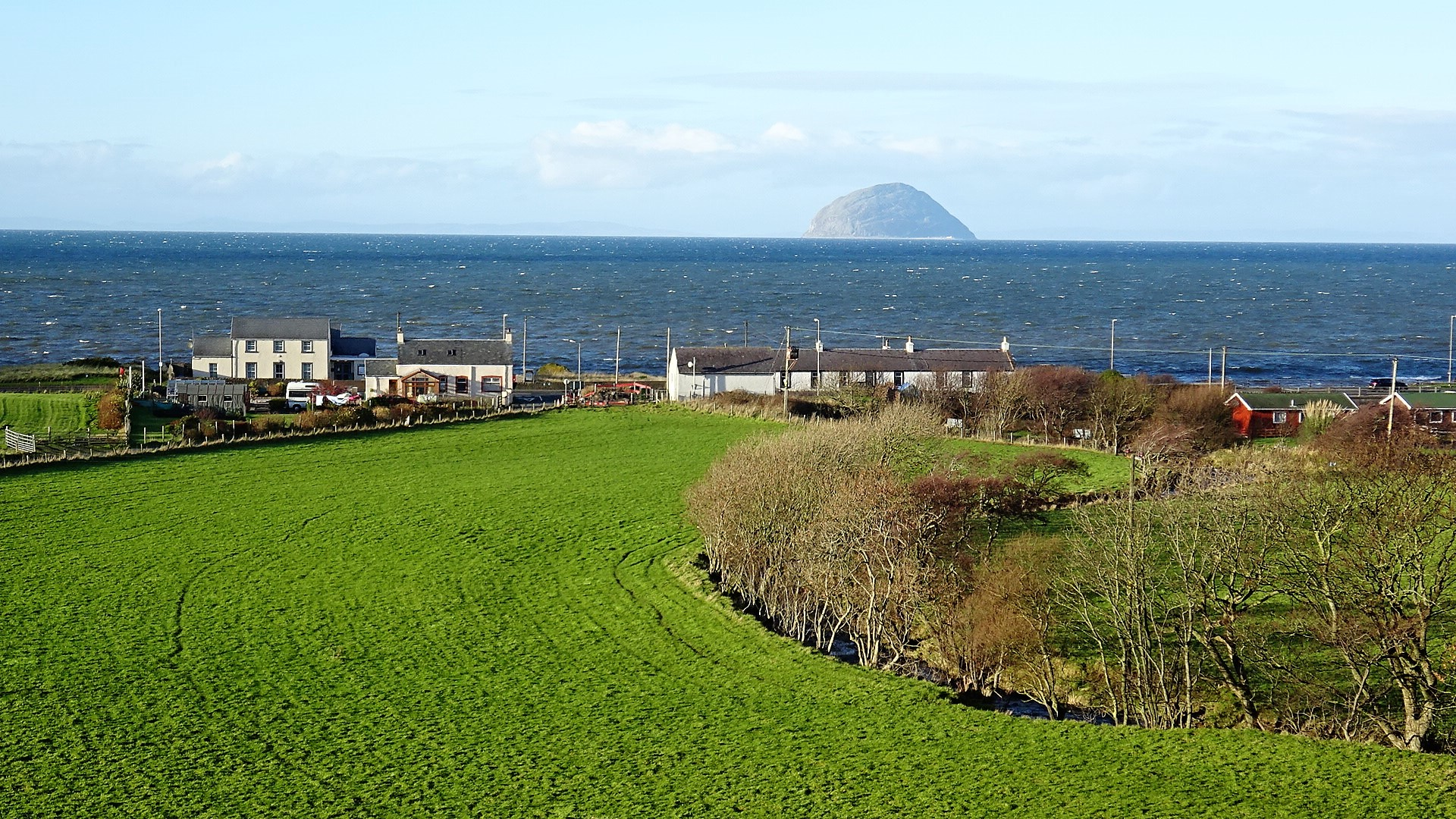
- Lendalfoot Village

- Location within South Ayrshire
- OS grid reference: NX131900
- Council area: South Ayrshire
- Lieutenancy area: Ayrshire and Arran
- Country: Scotland
- Sovereign state: United Kingdom
- Police: Scotland
- Fire: Scottish
- Ambulance: Scottish

Lendalfoot is a small village located on Carleton Bay, parish of Colmonell in the old district of Carrick, now South Ayrshire, about six miles (ten kilometres) south of Girvan, Scotland. This is mainly a farming district, lacking in woodland, with a low population density. The village sits astride the A77 that runs north to Girvan and south to Cairnryan and Stranraer. Carleton Hill rises to 520 feet or 158 metres from the road and is the site near its summit of earth banks, an ancient fort.

The Lendal Water rises from Loch Lochton and runs around four miles (six kilometres) before reaching the village and the sea at Carleton Bay.

Lendalfoot is the closest Mainland Scotland village to Ailsa Craig.

== History ==
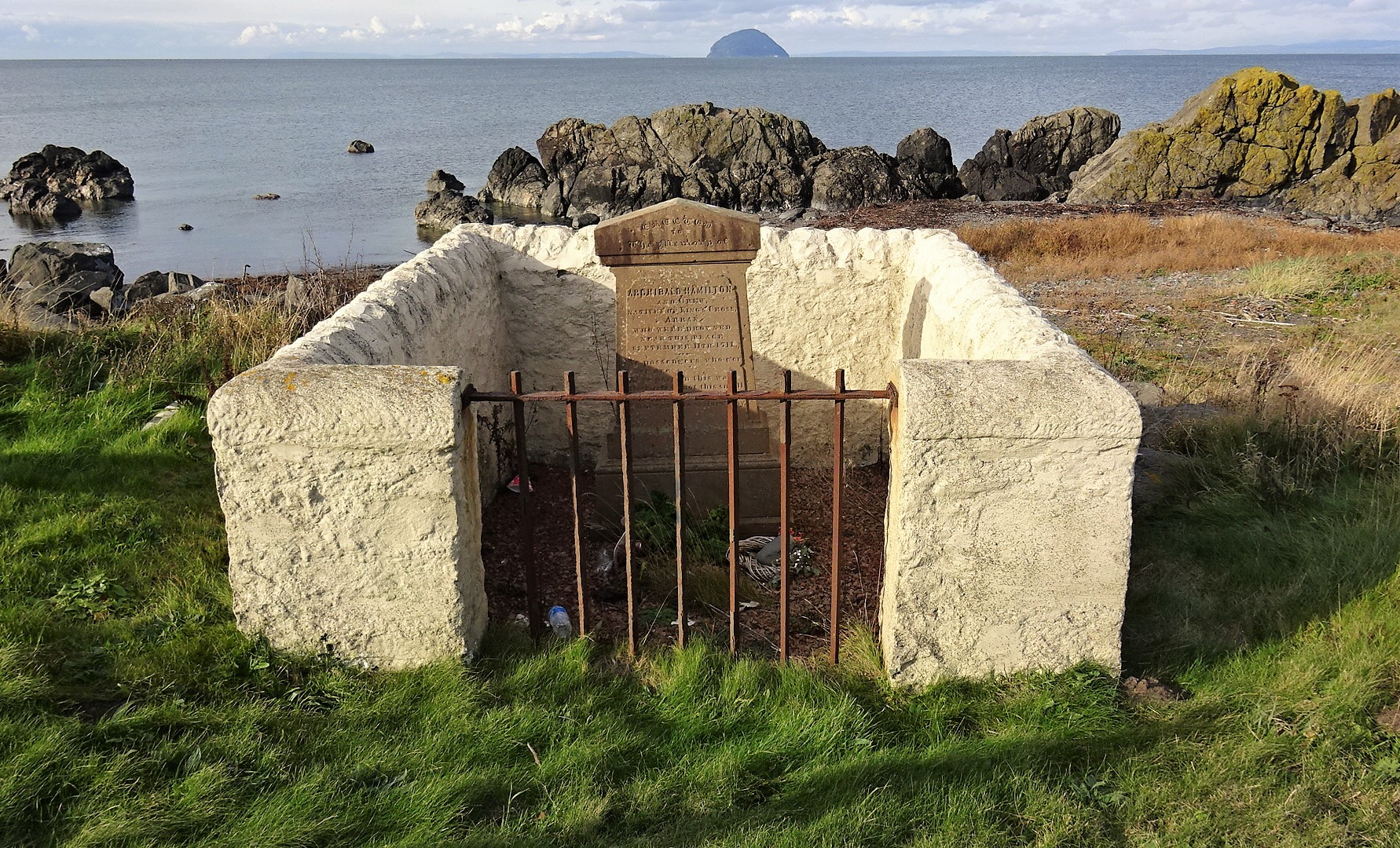
The memorial to Archie Hamilton and his crew

The village once had a post office and also a school that now serves as the community centre. A row of old farm workers cottages stands on the side of the road with back walls facing the sea. Carleton Terrace lies to the south of the village centre and dates from around 1933 when the Hamilton Estates made land available for what were then holiday homes, mostly built from wood at first, later on many were rebuilt in stone. The village has no church of its own however, as stated, it is part of the Colmonell Parish.

The Kittyfrist Well stands on the old coast road from Girvan, once a reliable source of water for travellers. This inland route was replaced by the modern day coastal course made possible by "Kennedy's Pass" forced through the rocks using explosives. The "Forest of Rocks" is a term used for the numerous sea stacks along this section of the coastline. Two of the sea stacks had the appearance of human figures and were called the 'Old and the young Laird'.

Next to the ruins of one of several hay rees on the raised beach area near the Lendal Water stands an old sea stack that is named on the OS map as the 'Deafstone'. Many Cornish miners came to Scotland and in Cornwall this term referred to rock that was deaf or useless.

A memorial stands on the side of the road with its back to the sea, consisting of a gravestone-like carved stone surrounded by a white painted wall. This structure commemorates the wrecking of a ship on this rocky shore and the drowning of Archie Hamilton and his crew from King's Cross on Arran on 11 September 1711.

Charles Berry (1852–1909) was an ornithologist and naturalist with a particular interest in the migratory behaviour of wheatears (Oenanthe oenanthe) who lived in the area and is commemorated on a memorial standing close to the Lendal Water on a low mound.

== Carleton Castle and Little Carleton Fort or Motte ==
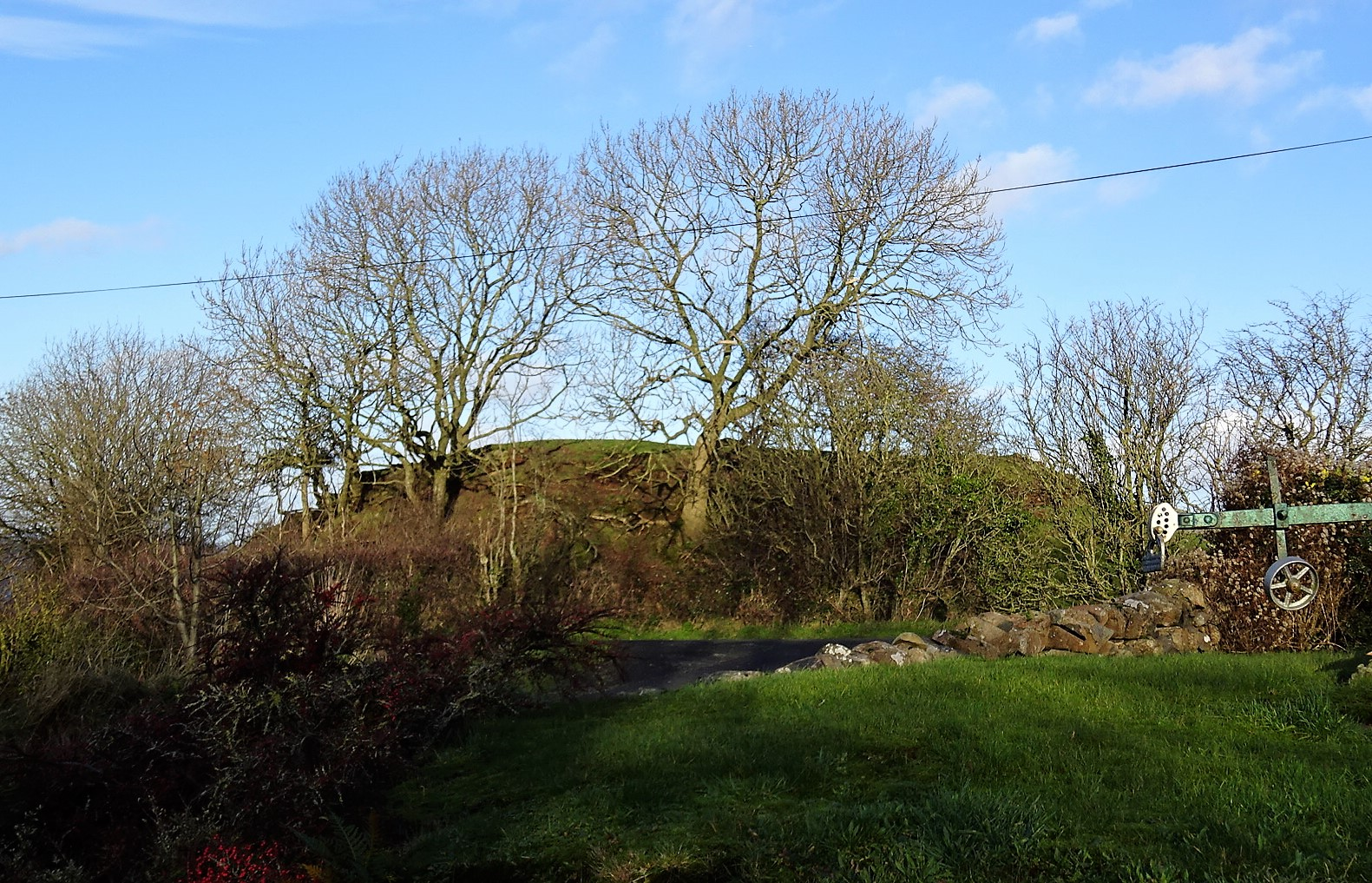
The Little Carleton Motte.

Carleton Castle is a 15th-century five-storey tower and barmakin, once held by the Cathcarts of Killochan that stands in a prominent position overlooking the village close to the Games Loup cliffs. The tower ruins still stand, apart from a collapsed section of wall that has been partly rebuilt at some stage and internal plastering suggests a later use as a dwelling. At the back of the tower pigsties type ruins survive that were still roofed in the 19th century according to OS maps. The barmakin or walled courtyard existed with towers at the angles on the area between the two glens and their burns. It guarded and controlled a mountain pass as well as the road along the raised beach. The tower had two vaults, one over the great hall and the second over the ground floor.

A substantial earth mound, the Carleton Fort or Motte with a circular ditch and palisaded bank built some centuries prior to the stone castle stands across from Little Carleton Farm, damaged by the construction of the lane to the village. Standing close to the castle the motte may nave served as the moot hill where the laird's barony court met. No place name evidence for a gallows hill has been noted.

=== Sir John Cathcart and the murdered heiresses ===
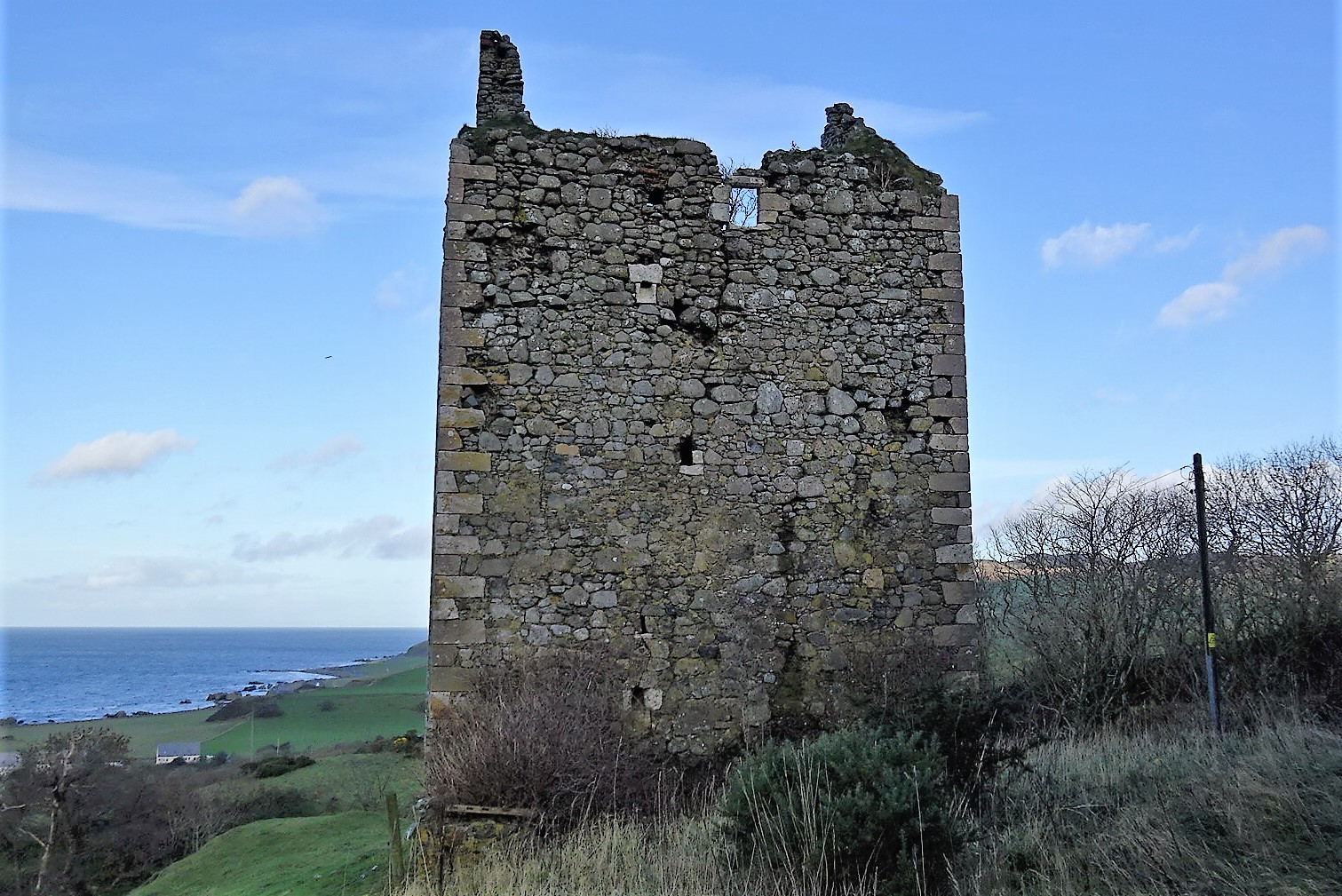
Carleton Castle tower

A legend derived from the ballad May or Mary Culzean exists in several versions in different books. The essence of the story is that Sir John Cathcart of Carleton Castle was in the habit of enriching his estate through marrying heiresses. The steep Games Loup cliffs stand close to the castle and one by one his brides met their end by accidentally falling from the path that ran along the edge. Mary Kennedy of Culzean was his ninth heiress bride and one evening whilst walking along the Games Loup her husband informed her that she was to meet her end, but that he would keep her valuable jewel and gold thread enriched clothes. Mary told her husband to act like a gentlemen and to turn his back to preserve her dignity whilst she undressed. Upon his turning she grabbed his arm, spun him around and cast him off the cliff to his death.

A John Cathcart of Carleton did exist, however he lived at Killochan Castle and it is not known how the legend became attached to his name. John's wife was Helen Wallace and he had at least two sons, John of Killochan and Robert of Nether Pinmore.

=== The Lousey or Lausey Knowe ===
On the south side of the Lendal Water stands an artificial mound that is recorded as the Lousey or Lausey Knowe. A local tradition has it that the women of the district used this site to de-louse their children's hair whilst another interpretation is that the name derives from the Scots language for a fire or signal hill, linked to the security and military activities of the castle.

== Placenames ==
The settlement name refers to its location at the confluence of the Lendal Water with the sea at Carleton Bay. Lendal is said to derive from the Scottish Gaelic: lean dail, meaning "marsh meadow". Carleton may derive from "carl" or "churl" (serfs') dwelling, however in the Whithorn Priory records it is recorded as "Cairiltoun", the "dwelling of the Cairils" who in 1095 it is said emigrated from Antrim to Carrick.

== Carleton Port and fishery ==
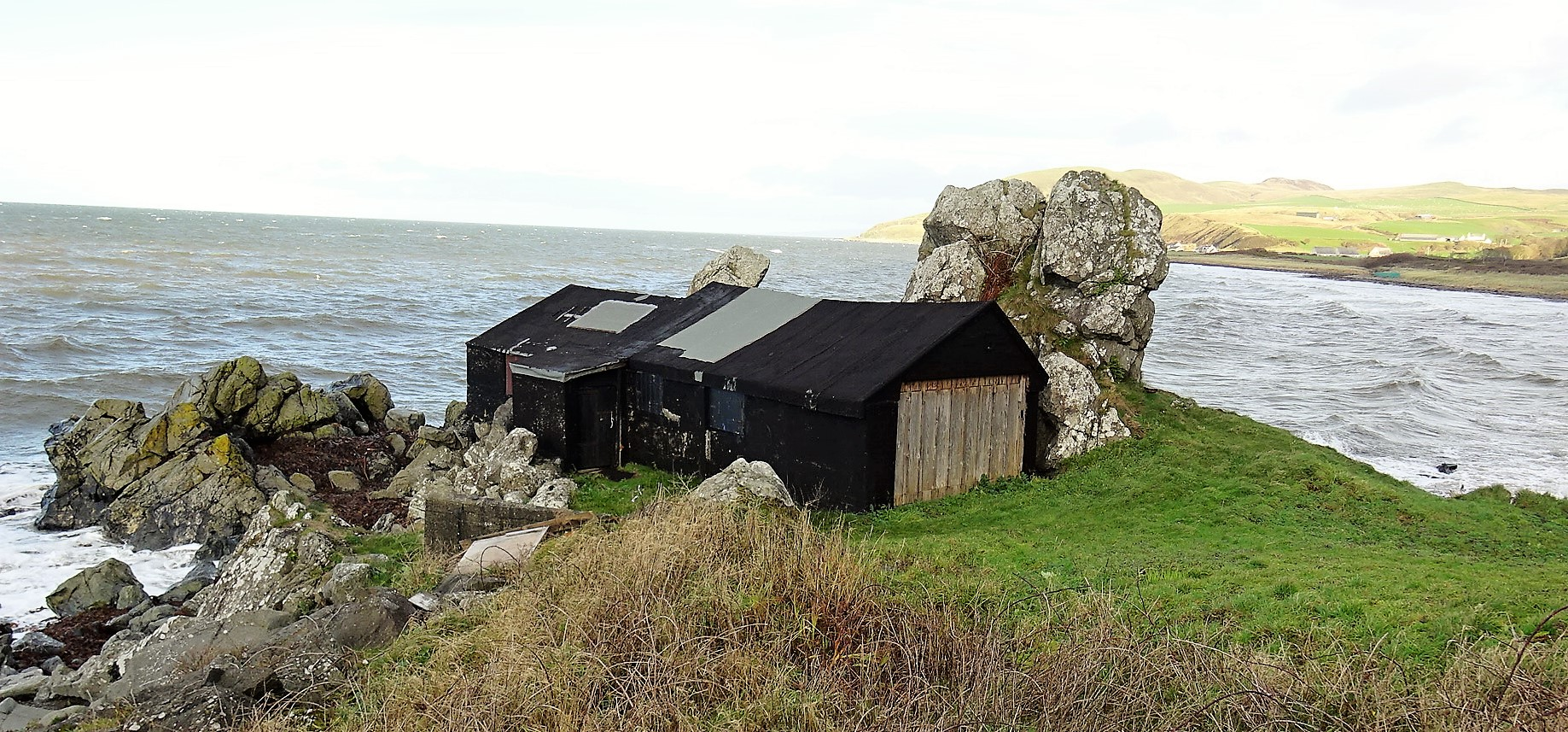
The old Salmon or Black Hut

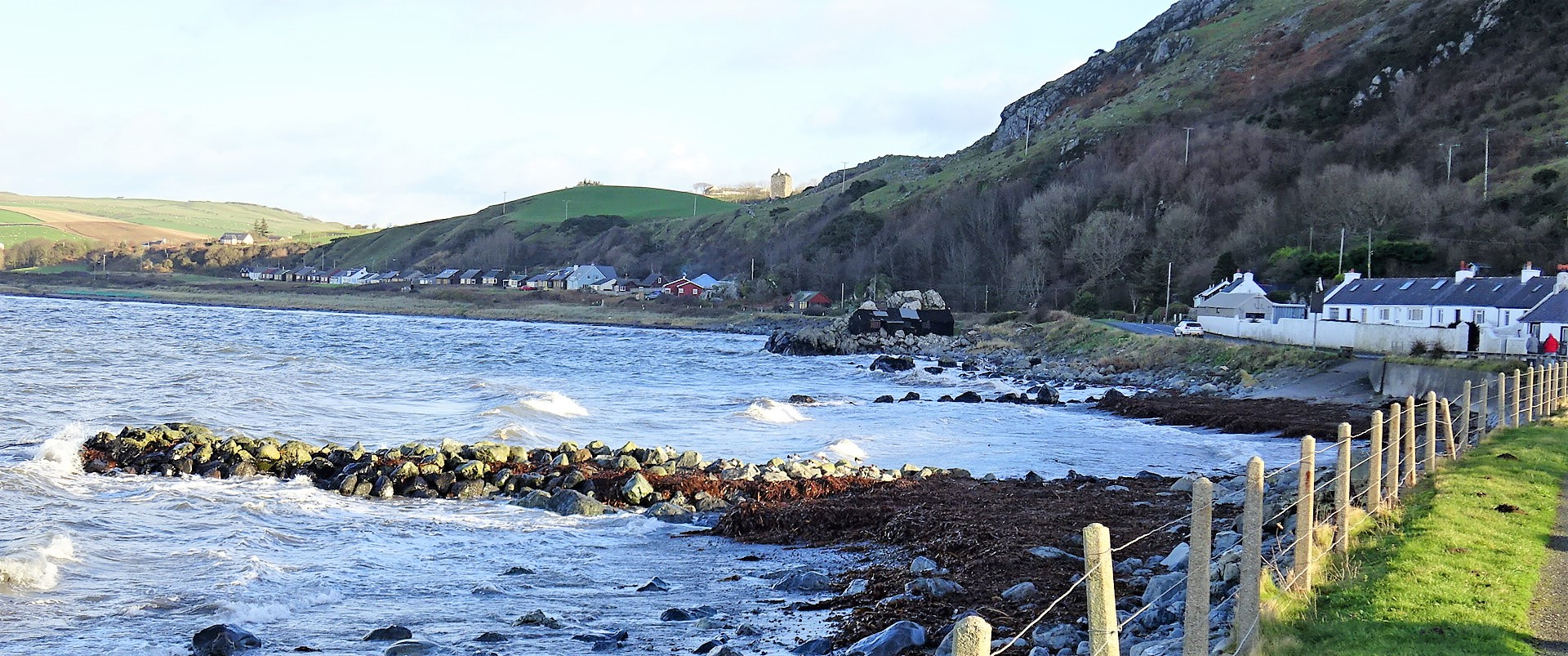
Carleton Port and Carleton Fishery

A small port was located at Carleton Port, used until the 1950s judging from old photographs, consisting once of a mast for drying nets, a concrete slip way, a winch, break waters built from stones cleared to give a sandy landing area and the "Black or Salmon hut" built onto an old sea stack, dating from at least 1938 where the fishermen kept their nets, etc. In 1832 the Carleton Fishery was built, consisting of a row of fishermens cottages that survive as private dwellings. One of the last fishermen had the nickname 'Mahogany', presumably from his sun and weather beaten skin colour. The remains of an old boat still lies close to the black hut (datum 2018).

== The Varyag Memorial ==
This memorial with parking area, preserved anchor, seating, etc. stands just beyond the Carleton Fishery and has a plaque that reads:-

"Here 500 metre off the coast, the Russian Cruiser Varyag, which won glory in the Russo-Japanese War of 1904–1905, found its last resting place.

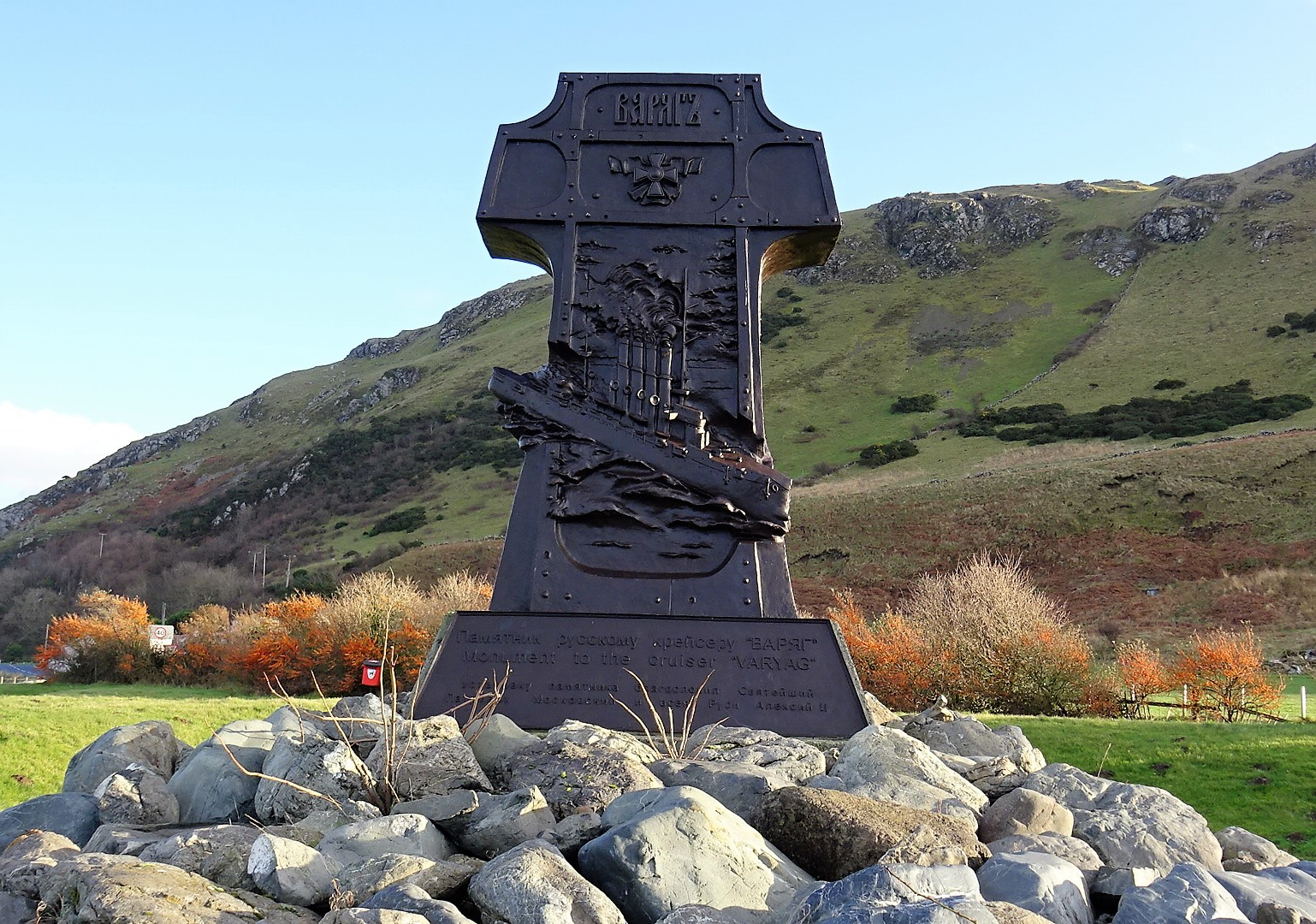
The Imperial battle cruiser Varyag Memorial

On January 27, 1904, the 1st Rank Cruiser Varyag and the Gunboat Koreets were blockaded by a Japanese squadron of 15 vessels at the Korean port of Cremulopo. They were offered the opportunity to surrender and turn down the flag. But the Russian seamen rejected the ultimatum and accepted an uneven battle. Varyag and Koreets suffered extensive damage during the battle. With no apparent possibility of continued resistance, the Russian seamen scuttled the ships and returned to Russia on board foreign vessels.

In 1905 Varyag was raised by the Japanese and was introduced into their navy under the name of Soya, in 1916 the cruiser was repurchased by Russia and got back its previous name. In 1917 she was sent to Britain for repair, but because of the revolution and civil war in Russia, the legendary ship was set adrift. In 1920 Varyag was sold by Britain for scrap. En route for dismantling she grounded near Lendalfoot and subsequently sunk.

The exploits of the cruiser Varyag, which makes us bow our heads to the valor of Russian seamen, will always remain in the memory of grateful future generations.

== Sources ==
- Campbell, Thorbjørn (2003). Ayrshire. A Historical Guide. Edinburgh : Birlinn. ISBN 1-84158-267-0
- Dobie, James D. (ed Dobie, J.S.) (1876). Cunninghame, Topographized by Timothy Pont 1604–1608, with continuations and illustrative notices. Glasgow: John Tweed.
- Love, Dane (2003). Ayrshire : Discovering a County. Ayr : Fort Publishing. ISBN 0-9544461-1-9.
- Love, Dane (2009). Legendary Ayrshire. Custom : Folklore : Tradition. Auchinleck : Carn.
- MacKenzie, W.C. (1931). Scottish Place-Names. London : Kegan Paul
- Smith, John (1895). Prehistoric Man in Ayrshire. London : Elliot Stock.
