= Southwick, West Sussex =

Town in West Sussex, England

Coordinates: 50.836°N 0.239°W

Southwick
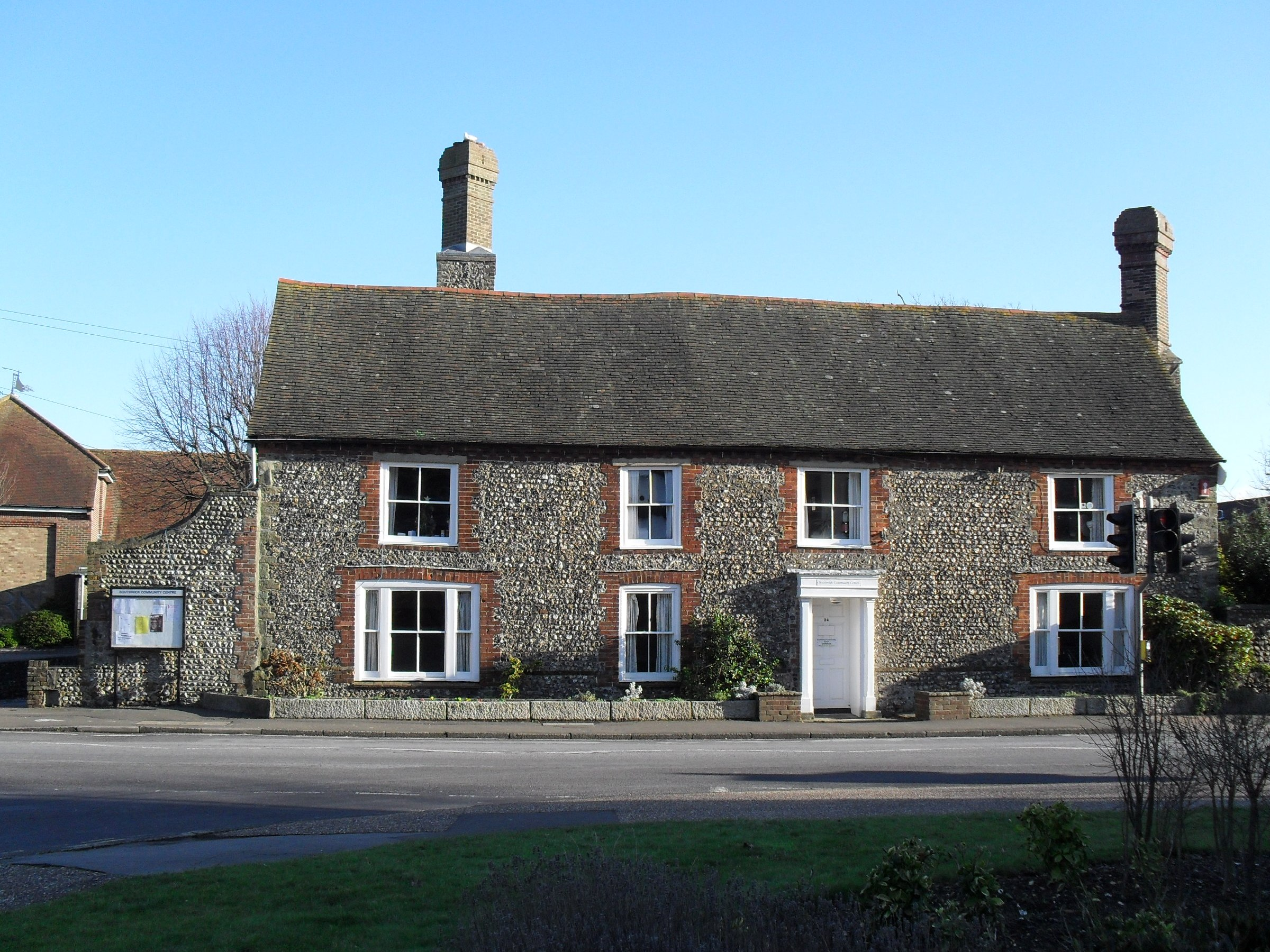

- Location within West Sussex
- Area: 3.33 sq mi (8.6 km^{2})
- Population: 13,195 2001 Census
  - Density: 3,962/sq mi (1,530/km^{2})
- OS grid reference: TQ241055
  - London: 46 miles (74 km) N
- District: Adur
- Shire county: West Sussex
- Region: South East
- Country: England
- Sovereign state: United Kingdom
- Post town: BRIGHTON
- Postcode district: BN42
- Dialling code: 01273
- Police: Sussex
- Fire: West Sussex
- Ambulance: South East Coast
- UK Parliament: East Worthing and Shoreham

Southwick (/ˈsaʊθwɪk/) is a town in the Adur district of West Sussex, England located five miles (8 km) west of Brighton. It covers an area of 863.7 ha (2,134 acres). In 2001 it had a population of 13,195.

The town is loosely divided into three sections: south of Brighton Road is the harbour with its associated industries and businesses; north of Brighton Road up to Old Shoreham Road is mainly residential properties dating from the middle of the nineteenth century to the 1950s; and the area between Old Shoreham Road and the South Downs being the most recent to be developed, also largely residential.

The main road which passes through the town is now designated the A259 coast road. The A27 road bypasses the town to its north.

== History ==
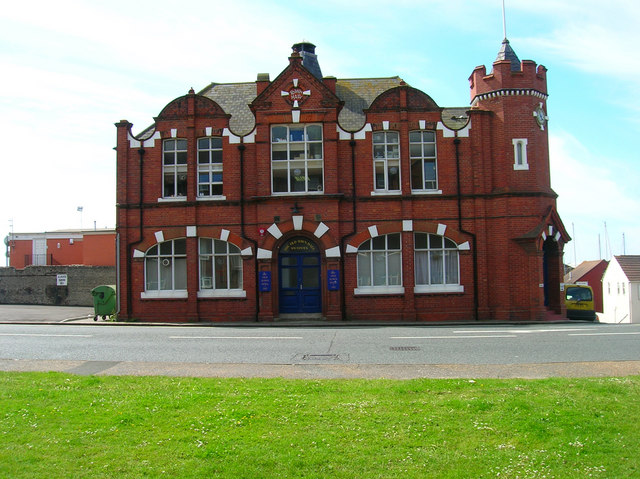
The Old Town Hall

Southwick was recorded in the Domesday Book (1086): Nigel holds Esmerwick of William. Azor held it of King Edward. Then, and now, it vouched for one hide and a half. There is land for 4 ploughs. In demesne are 2 ploughs, and 4 villeins and 6 bordars with 2 ploughs. In the time of King Edward it was worth 40 shillings, and afterwards 30 shillings. Now 4 pounds. In that excerpt, the village is referred to by its Saxon name, Esmerewick, meaning East pool hamlet. The village was first recorded as Southwick in 1309.

The town grew as the coast became a popular holiday destination, many of the properties being tourist accommodation. The railway arrived in the town on 12 May 1840, being the original terminus.

Beneath Manor Hall Road lies a first century AD Roman villa. It was an elaborately decorated lavish residence similar in design to Fishbourne Roman Palace. The site was acquired by the Sussex Archaeological Trust in 1931 and part of the villa was opened to the viewing public during summer months. In 1953–4 the site was sold to a property developer and in 1965 the Methodist church on Manor Hall Road was built. The site has now been developed for housing.

There is a tradition that King Charles II stayed overnight at the cottages on Southwick Green before escaping to France. The Old Town Hall in Albion Street was completed in 1906.

== Community ==
The town's open-air shopping centre, Southwick Square, is home to many traditional and local businesses as well as some larger chains, and is central to the village since its expansion north of the Old Shoreham Road in the middle of the twentieth century. Before that the main shops were located on Albion Street, the main coast road. Adjacent to 'the Square', as it is known locally, is the Southwick Community Centre, and Southwick Library, which was rebuilt for 2007.

=== Education ===
Primary schools are Eastbrook Primary Academy on Manor Hall Road (formerly Manor Hall First and Middle schools), Holmbush Primary Academy and Herons Dale School, a community special school, both in Hawkins Crescent (just on the Shoreham side of the Shoreham/Southwick border), and Glebe Primary in Church Lane. The main secondary schools for this catchment area are in Shoreham-By-Sea: King's Manor Community College (comprehensive), now rebranded Shoreham Academy and Shoreham College (public). Some children may go further afield and attend Portslade Community College, St Andrew's CE High School for Boys or Davison High School (for Girls) in Worthing, Cardinal Newman Catholic School in Hove, or Steyning Grammar School.

=== Transport ===
Southwick is served by Southwick railway station on the West Coastway Line, which connects to Southampton westbound and Brighton eastbound.

700 Coastliner busses operated by Stagecoach also run across the south of the town across the A259 operating services to Brighton to the east and Worthing across to Littlehampton to the west. Brighton & Hove busses also operate the 46 service from the town to Hollingbury (Brighton).

=== Recreation ===
There is a leisure centre and recreation ground in Old Barn Way, which is home to Southwick Football Club.

Southwick Hockey Club has a local clubhouse, although the home pitch is in Portslade.

The Green, once common land central to the old village, consists of two separate fields divided by a short road of the same name. The smaller southern field, also home to the town's war memorial located in the south-eastern corner, is often used for local cricket matches. The larger northern field contains a small children's playground and is most often used for general recreation and is also the location where travelling fairgrounds and local fairs will set up during the summer and autumn months. There is also some parkland off Cross Road, just south of the Old Shoreham Road. North of the Old Shoreham Road, there is Quayside, once home to the Quayside Youth Centre which burned down in May 2005 and since re-built.

Unusually for a town of its size, Southwick has a theatrical scene thanks to the Barn Theatre, an 18th-century barn building converted into a theatre in 1951 and thoroughly revamped in 1998.

== Media ==
Local news and television programmes is provided by BBC South East and ITV Meridian. Television signals are received from the Whitehawk Hill TV transmitter. Local radio stations are BBC Radio Sussex on 95.3 FM, Heart South on 103.5 FM, Capital Brighton on 107.2 FM, and More Radio Worthing on 107.7 FM. The town is served by the local newspapers, Shoreham Herald and The Argus.

== Religious life ==
=== Churches ===
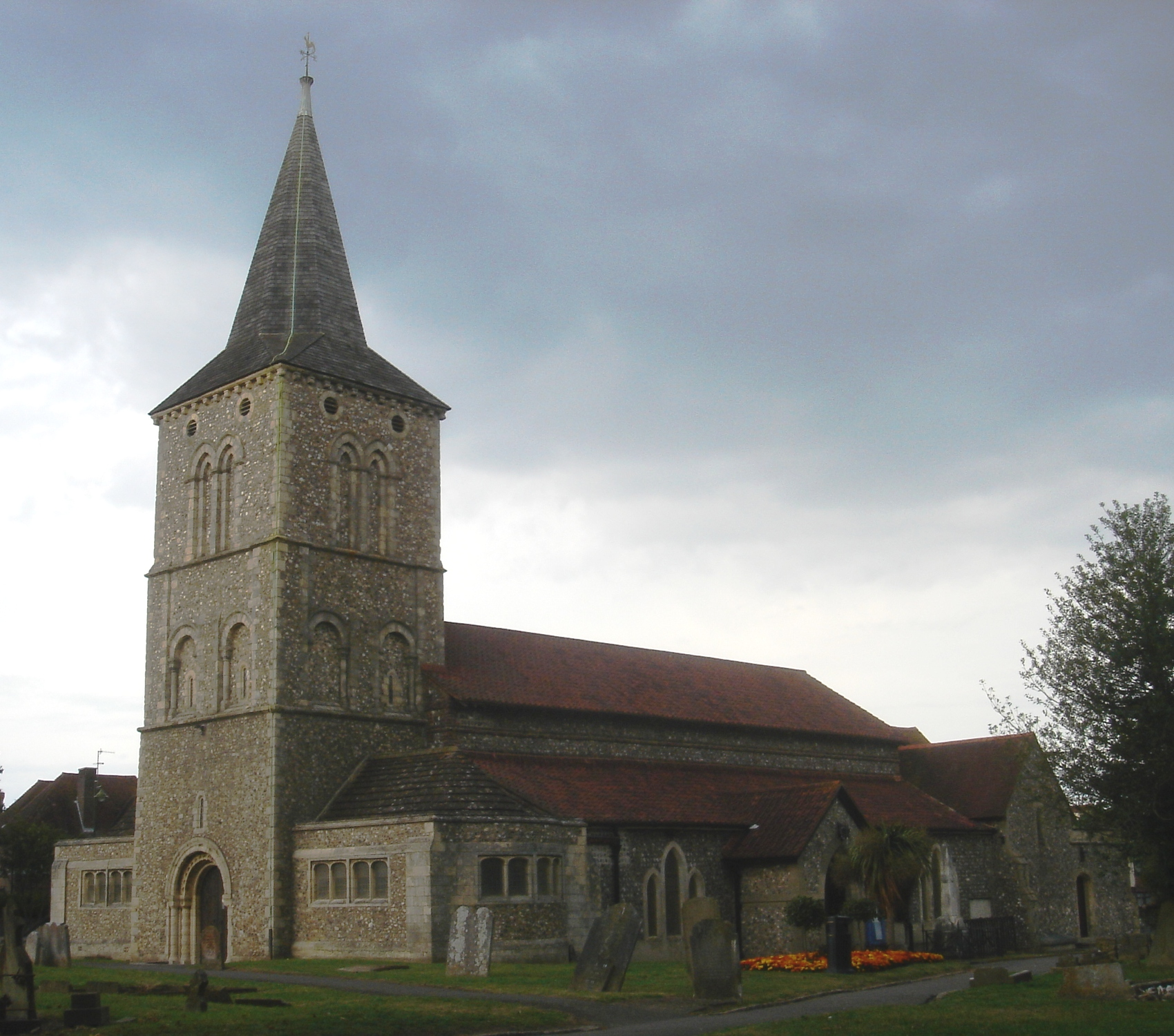
St Michael and All Angels Church

There are several churches in Southwick: St Michael and All Angels in Church Lane, St Theresa of Lisieux (RC) in Downland Avenue, Southwick Methodist Church in Manor Hall Road and Southwick Christian Community Church in Roman Crescent.

== Notable residents ==
- Attila the Stockbroker, punk poet, grew up in Southwick and lives there today.
- Dame Clara Butt, celebrated contralto, was born at 27 Adur Terrace.
- Thérèse Lessore, artist, born in Southwick
- S. P. B. Mais, author, journalist, and broadcaster
- Ralf Rangnick, German football player and manager
- George Albert Smith, pioneer film-maker, lived in Roman Crescent.
- Wing Commander Ken Wallis, leading exponent of autogyros, lived in Church Lane.
