= Colmonell =

Village and civil parish in Scotland

Coordinates: 55°07′59″N 4°54′28″W

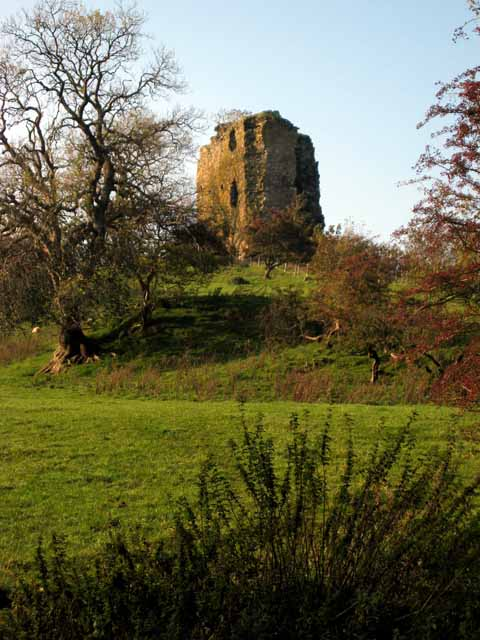
- Craigneil Castle, Colmonell

- Location within South Ayrshire
- OS grid reference: NX147859
- Council area: South Ayrshire
- Lieutenancy area: Ayrshire and Arran
- Country: Scotland
- Sovereign state: United Kingdom
- Post town: GIRVAN
- Postcode district: KA26
- Dialling code: 01465
- Police: Scotland
- Fire: Scottish
- Ambulance: Scottish
- UK Parliament: Ayr, Carrick and Cumnock
- Scottish Parliament: Carrick, Cumnock and Doon Valley

Colmonell (Scottish Gaelic: Cill Cholmain Eala; meaning the church of St. Colman of Lainn Eala – in Lynally, County Offaly, Ireland) is a small village and civil parish in the Stinchar Valley, South Ayrshire, Scotland. The nearest town is Girvan, 11 miles (18 kilometres) away.

The River Stinchar runs through the valley and the Colmonell area boasts three ruined castles: Craigneil Castle (thirteenth century), Kirkhill Castle (sixteenth century) and Knockdolian Castle (sixteenth century).

The village has a small primary school, pub, fire station and village church.

With a small population, Colmonell is a close community. The village has an annual Church Fete in August and an agricultural show the same month. In June there is the annual gala day, or "Fun Day", which is run by the Community Association. This has been extended in recent years to become a "Fun Week" during which a range of activities are arranged for the local community.

Colmonell church was remodelled internally in 1899 by Robert Lorimer. Lorimer also designed the village war memorial in 1922.

Lendalfoot and Carleton Port lie within the parish of Colmonell and have no church of their own. The 15th-century Carleton Castle stands above Lendalfoot with the Little Carleton Fort nearby.
