= List of works by Paul Woodroffe =

- Born: 1875; India
- Died: 1954 (aged 78–79); Eastbourne
- Education: Educated at Stonyhurst and then studied at the Slade School of Art from 1893 to 1896 and then was a pupil of Christopher Whall until 1901.
- Known for: Stained Glass
- Notable work: See list below. His most important commission was for fifteen windows for St Patrick’s Cathedral in New York.

This is a listing of the major works of Paul Woodroffe (1875–1954).

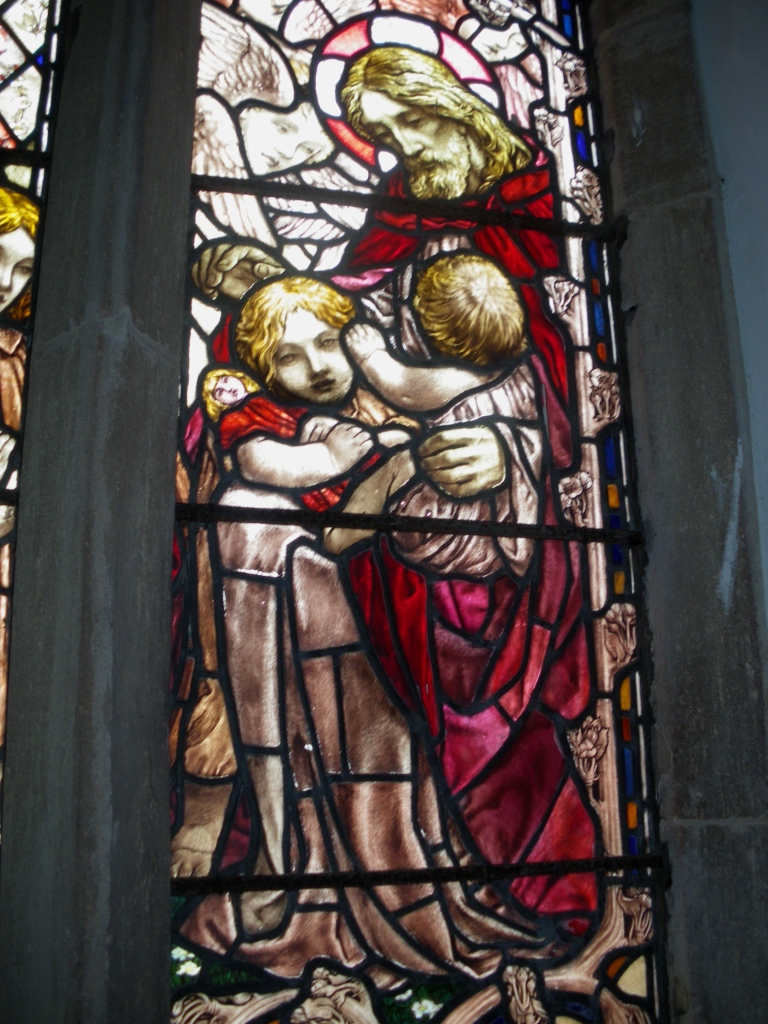
Woodroffe work in Herringswell

== Works ==
=== St Paul ===
This church in Bedford, Bedfordshire has a 1908 three-light Woodroffe window in the South Chapel area which depicts the Virgin & Child, St Francis and St Clare. The window is in memory of Lettice Mary Shaw who died in 1904.

=== St Mary ===
For the North Nave area of this Frensham, Surrey church Woodroffe completed a two-light window in 1917 depicting the Annunciation and in memory of H. & P. Baker.

=== St Joseph Roman Catholic Church ===
For this Bishop Stortford, Hertfordshire church Wodroffe executed two windows in 1906. Both were single light windows and depict the Blessed Virgin Mary.

=== St John the Evangelist ===
For St John the Evangelist Church, Brentford in London, Woodroffe completed an East window in the form of a trefoil and depicting St John.

=== St Ignatius Roman Catholic Church ===
Stamford Hill, Outer London

This church in Stamford Hill, Outer London, has a 1915 three-light East window that is by Woodroffe and depicts the Annunciation, the Crucifixion, the last Supper and the Resurrection. Woodroffe completed a second window for the South Aisle area. This is a single light and depicts St George and St Charles Borromeo.

=== Church of St Mary ===
For this Pembroke Dock, Pembrokeshire church, Woodroffe executed a two-light window depicting the Saints David and Patrick in 1929. The window is on the East wall of the Chancel and in the right hand light David is depicted standing with a boy, whose arms are stretched up towards him and in the left hand light Patrick is seen impaling a snake.

=== Our Lady of Lourdes and St Joseph ===
Woodroffe completed two windows for this Leigh-on-Sea, Essex church. A window depicting Sir Thomas More was executed for the South Aisle in 1933, and a window for the porch was completed in 1940. Despite appearances to the contrary, Our Lady of Lourdes and St Joseph is a 20th-century church, its construction having been authorised in 1918 after tireless work by Canon Francis Gilbert to have a church built on the site. The Canon even designed the church tower himself with its peal of eight bells. During construction a large white stone carved from rocks at Gallipoli was placed into the church to honour the dead of that ill-fated World War One campaign.

=== St Mary's Catholic Church ===
The architect of this church in Uttoxeter, Staffordshire was Augustus Welby Pugin, and it was opened in 1839. The South Aisle has windows by Woodroffe erected in the period 1915 to 1938, and the war memorial window in the Narthex is also his work. The three-light window in the South Aisle is a memorial to Captain Oswald J Bamford who served with the 6th Battalion North Staffs Regiment. He was killed at Loos on 13 October 1915 aged 38 years. Oswald has no known grave and is commemorated on Panel 103 of the Loos Memorial. The window was donated to the church by his wife, Daisy. It is a three-light, traceried window. The left-hand light depicts Oswald, King of Northumbria. The sword behind his head symbolises that he died in battle, and he holds a baton topped by a right hand. This represents the story that his hand remained incorrupt after his death because he had used it to give food to a starving man. The centre light depicts St. Mary. The right-hand panel shows St. Margaret of Scotland, revered as an example of an ideal wife, and the inscription records the fact that the panel was donated by Oswald's wife. Her full name was Olga Daisy Beatrice Bamford, and a single daisy appears in this panel close to the figure of St. Margaret. St. Margaret carries loaves in her apron, symbolising her concern for the poor. The inscription reads "Deo gloria Mariae honor piae memoriae Oswald Bamford in bello occisi Octr 13 1915 R.I.P. amans uxor posuit." The war memorial window in the Narthex is also of three-lights. The centre panel shows the Archangel Michael, who, according to the apocalypse, vanquished Satan. He appears in battle armour and carries the scales of Justice, symbolising the Last Judgement. In the left-hand panel of the memorial window is St. Joan of Arc, representing the French Allies. St George is depicted in the right-hand light. The window carries the inscription "Militibus Catholicis civitas Uttoxeter qui in bello 1914-18 vita dederunt concines grato animo posuerunt R.I.P." A second window in the South Aisle was dedicated to members of the Bamford family, including Henry and Julian Bamford, Oswald's brothers. The centre panel shows St. Mary. She is flanked on either side by the two martyrs Thomas More and John Fisher. Thomas More was the "Man for all Seasons" and Chancellor of England, and behind him in the window we can see the Tower of London, where both he and John Fisher were imprisoned and executed. Behind Fisher's figure, Woodroffe has included Fisher's Cathedral church of Rochester. This church also has stained glass made by Messrs. Wailes, Hardman and Mayer & Co of Munich. Bamford was incidentally educated at Stonyhurst.

=== Church of our Lady and St Peter ===
In a five-light East window in this church in Leatherhead, Surrey the centre light depicts the Incarnation, and Our Lady is shown holding the child Jesus. The two lights to the right depict the Annunciation, and we see the archangel Gabriel delivering God's message to the Virgin Mary that she had been chosen to be the Mother of God. The left-hand two lights are a Pietà in which the dead Christ, taken down from the Cross, is held in the arms of his grieving Mother with St John nearby. Shafts of light come down from heaven and onto the Head of Mary, and in two small centre lights are angels who hold banners with the words "Jesu mercy, Mary help." This window was commissioned by Sir Edward Hulton as a memorial to his parents and sister and bears the inscription "In loving memory of Edward Hulton, his wife Mary, and their daughter Mary Ellen. May they rest in peace." This small Catholic church was built in 1923 largely due to the generosity of the newspaper mogul, Sir Edward Hulton. A second window depicts St. Bernadette kneeling before the Blessed Virgin Mary. There is another five-light west window which shows Mary with Jesus, and in the right-hand lights the three wise men and the shepherds in the two lights to the left. In another window of two lights, Woodroffe shows Peter being given charge of the church, and this is inscribed "Pray for the soul of Sir Edward Hulton. Mindful of his many generous gifts. RIP." Apart from Woodroffe's windows, which featured in the Royal Mail Christmas issue stamps in 1992, the church has Stations of the Cross by Eric Gill which are similar to those in Westminster Cathedral. The Saxon-style baptismal font is by Gill's nephew, John Skelton. The church was built in 1923 and also has excellent stained glass by Caroline and Tony Benyon.

=== Dovers House ===
In 1926 Woodroffe purchased Dovers House in Westington, Gloucestershire as an investment. He left his mark in the shape of a stained glass roundel of Little Miss Muffet.

=== St Michael ===
For this church Macclesfield, Cheshire, Woodroffe executed a three-light window in the vestry. The window's central light depicts a scene from the boyhood of Christ; he is shown in the carpenter's shop, sweeping up the shavings. In the left hand light Woodroffe depicts Joseph with mallet and chisel and in the right hand light we see Mary who is spinning. The photograph shown is courtesy Matthew Hyde. The adjacent window is incidentally by Christopher Whall. All the stained glass in the church, except for some tiny medieval fragments, dates from the period 1900-1920 and as well as Whall includes some late work by Morris & Co as well as windows from Shrigley & Hunt, Kempe, and two very big windows by Powells.

=== St Ethelbert ===
St Ethelbert in Herringswell, Suffolk has a marvellous collection of stained glass including three Whall windows and one by Jeremy Brett. Woodroffe's "Suffer little children" is therefore in good Arts and Crafts company. Woodroofe's window is situated in the Chancel North wall. In Woodroffe's composition he includes a doll carried by the little girl, as she approaches Christ.

=== St Catharine's Roman Catholic Church ===
This Chipping Campden, Gloucestershire church was built in 1891 in the Victorian Gothic style has several windows by Woodroffedating to 1925. One in the south aisle is dated 1925. Richard Lynch-Staunton's daughter, Frances Juanita "Dorothy" Lynch-Staunton, married Woodroffe in 1907. Both Richard and his wife died in the 1920s and have stained glass windows in St Catharine's in their memory. They are buried in the St Catharine Churchyard. The window includes the inscription "Of your charity pray for the soul of Marion Lynch-Staunton who died October 2nd 1928."

=== St Patrick's Cathedral ===
For this Cathedral in New York the stained-glass windows in the Lady Chapel were designed and made in Chipping Campden, England, by Woodroffe between 1912 and 1934. It was in 1909 that Woodroffe was asked to submit designs for the glazing of the chapel by Archbishop (later Cardinal) Farley. Woodroffe chose the theme of "The Mysteries of the Rosary". As well as Biblical subjects several of the windows depict early American missionaries and clergy associated with the history of New York's Catholic community. For some of the panels, designed after the Great War, Woodroffe introduced a topical note: one of them shows a Bolshevik iconoclast, complete with peaked hat and red flag, toppling a cross from the top of a church.

=== Court Farm ===
Mary Anderson was a well-known American stage actress who lived at Court Farm, High Street, Broadway, Worcestershire. She was a devout Roman Catholic and had a chapel built in her attic, with stained-glass windows designed by Woodroffe.

=== St Mary ===
Woodroffe's East window for this Goudhurst, Kent church depicts Christ on the Cross in the centre light with angels on either side. In the right-hand light are two figures from "The Noble Army of Martyrs". In another superb three-light window, Woodroffe executed a "Christ in Majesty" with the words "Love me" beneath the central figure of Christ.

=== St Dunstan ===
For this Cranbrook, Kent church Woodroffe executed a four-light traceried window which depicts (left to right) King David, the Blessed Virgin Mary, St Cecilia and St Michael, the Archangel.

=== Holy Trinity ===
For this Caister-on-Sea, Norfolk church Woodroffe executed a 1901 East window described by Nikolaus Pevsner and Bill Wilson in The Buildings of England- Norfolk 1: Norwich and North-East as "Arts and Crafts depiction of Christ with fishermen." Window commemorates the 1901 life-boat disaster.

=== St Anthony of Padua ===
For this Rye, East Sussex church Woodroffe executed a single-light window in 1918 which depicts St Anthony. Another dated 1916 features St Michael.

=== St Tarcisius ===
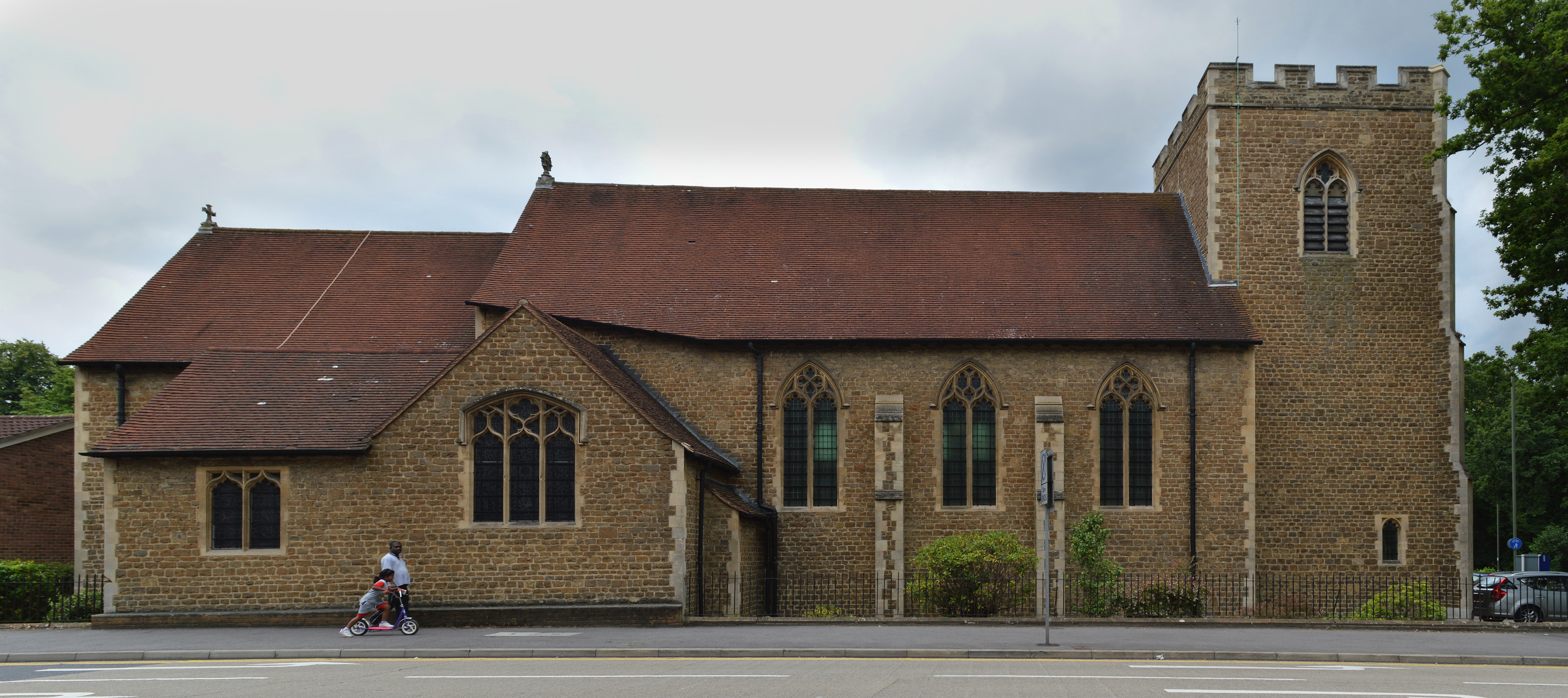
Church of St Tarcisius, Camberley

St Tarcisius Church, Camberley, was built between 1923 and 1926 primarily as a memorial to Catholic British Army officers who lost their lives in World War I. It was designed by the architect F A Walters, and is a Grade II Listed Building. It was built of Bargate coursed stone rubble with Bath stone dressings and has a tiled roof. St Tarcisius was a martyr of the early Christian church who lived in the 3rd century. He died at the hands of a mob rather than deliver to them the Blessed Sacrament, which he was carrying. Woodroffe completed three windows for this church. The first was installed in 1923 and depicts the Visitation, the second of 1935 is a five-light traceried window depicting the Crucifixion, and the final 1945 window of two-lights has the theme "Noli me tangere". St Tarcisus also has stained glass by Edward Woore and Harry Stammers.

=== Stonyhurst College ===
Stonyhurst College was founded by the Jesuits at St Omer and moved to Bruges and Liege before moving to a site next to the Lancashire village of Hurst Green in the Ribble Valley in 1794. For his old college, Woodroffe designed with B. Kirby the memorial to the dead of the Second Boer War (1899 to 1902) which is a bronze plaque reading: "TO THE GREATER GLORY OF GOD, IN HONOUR OF OUR/ LADY, AND IN LOVING AND LASTING MEMORY OF/ THOSE SCHOLARS OF STONYHURST WHO GAVE THEIR LIVES FOR THEIR COUNTRY IN THE WAR/ IN S. AFRICA 1899 - 1902/ (Names)/ MAY THEY REST IN PEACE,/ FURTHER, TO BRING TO MIND A GREAT COMPANY/ OF OLD STONYHURST BOYS WHO IN THE SAME/ CAMPAIGN LEFT FOREVER AN EXAMPLE OF/ CATHOLIC LOYALTY AND SOLDIERLY SERVICE/ WORTHY OF THE TRADITIONS OF THIS COLLEGE." The top of the plaque depicts Christ rising from the tomb. The border features acorns, oak leaves and shields bearing the crests of St Omer, Bruges, Liege and Stonyhurst. These are places where the college had been situated. The plaque remembers the six old boys who were killed. It was unveiled on 27 July 1904 by Lt. Gen Kelly-Kenny.

=== Church of the Holy Name of Jesus ===
The Church of the Holy Name of Jesus, Manchester, is of a typical counter-Reformation style, with short sanctuary, large pulpit in the congregation, confessionals, etc., although it is dressed as a 14th-century Gothic building. Other styles have been introduced throughout the years, one being that of the Arts and Crafts movement in the first half of the 20th century. The great window in the south transept, the Memorial Window for parishioners who died in the First World War, is by Paul Woodroffe

=== St Francis Xavier ===
For St Francis Xavier Church in Liverpool, Woodroffe executed a window which depicts St Francis Xavier giving a blessing, and the inscription reads "ST FRANCIS XAVIER APOSTLE OF THE INDIES PRAY FOR US"

=== Leicester Royal Infirmary Chapel ===
The hospital's Victorian chapel was designed by William Beaumont Smith and has many dedications to past nurses and medical staff. It has a three-light west window by Woodroffe depicting the Nativity. In the centre light the Star of Bethlehem shines down on Mary who cradles Jesus in her arms. In the left hand light are shepherds one carrying a flute. In the right hand light Woodroffe depicts the three wise men.

=== Our Lady Immaculate & St Joseph ===
For this Prescot, Merseyside church, Woodroffe executed a two-light window in 1903.

=== St Mary ===
Woodroffe executed a two-light traceried window for this church in Frensham, Surrey depicting the Annunciation. Window is in memory of Henry Baker of Simmondstone and his wife.

=== St John’s Roman Catholic Church ===
Four-light window for this Alton, Staffordshire church thought to be Woodroffe's first commission. Includes St George complete with St George's flag.

=== St Mary ===
Two single-light windows were executed for St Mary's Church in Edith Weston, Rutland.

=== St Matthew ===
Two-light traceried window executed for this church in Sutton Bridge, Lincolnshire in 1902. The window is above the Lady Chapel altar and depicts one of the post-resurrection appearances of Christ to His disciples. The inscription reads, "To the Glory of God & in memory of Henry Thomas Fountaine, M.A." (in the left hand light) and "Vicar of this Parish A.D. 1880-1901" (right hand light).

=== SS Mary and Michael ===
Woodroffe executed a two-light window for this church in Great Urswick, Cumbria. The window is situated in the West wall of the church and is known as the Maids' Window. It was presented to the church in 1913 by The Girls' Friendly Society, which was an extensive international organisation for Christian girls and young women which still exists in some places. On the stone sill under the window is the following inscription: "Guinevere Kennedy, Marguerite her sister and with other Maidens have given The Maids' Window. Commenced Sept 11 1912, completed Jan. 24 1913."

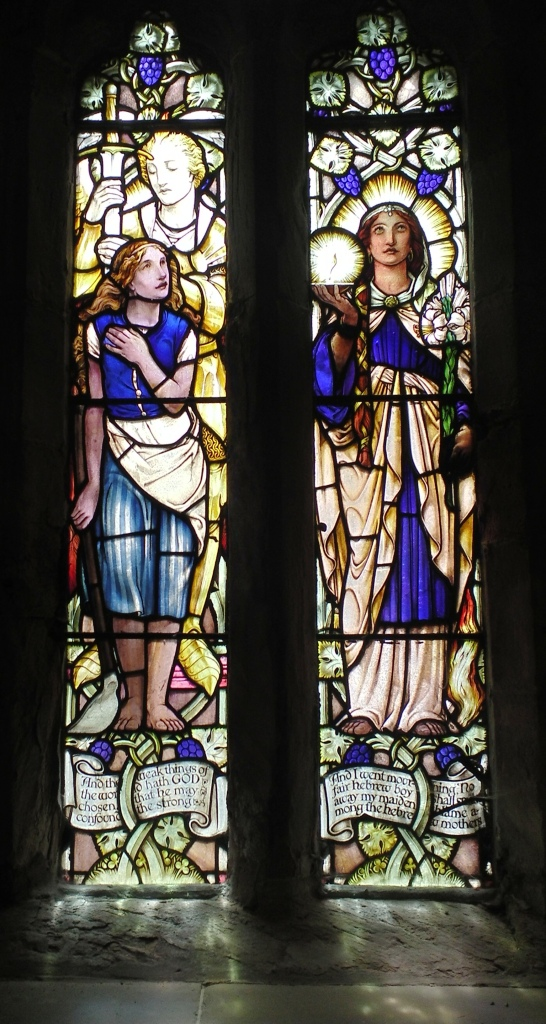
The Maids' window, Great Urswick

The church underwent a major refurbishing during the period 1908 - 1912, and one of the major additions was the installation of a new wooden organ casing, choir pews, reredos and archway to the chancel, as well as other works, all carved by Alec Miller of the Chipping Camden Guild. These are greatly admired and rightly so. The inscription at the bottom of the left-hand light reads, "And the weak things of the world hath GOD chosen that he may confound the strong." (Corinthians 1-27), and that at the bottom of the right-hand light reads "And I went mourning, “No fair Hebrew boy shall smile away my maiden blame among the Hebrew mothers.” this being a quotation from Tennyson.

=== Holy Trinity ===
Woodroffe's work in this Hadley, Shropshire church includes a light depicting the Madonna and child.

=== St John's Roman Catholic Church ===
In this Trowbridge, Wiltshire church, Woodroffe executed a window dedicated to Margaret Paton.

=== St Lawrence ===
Another redundant church managed by the Churches Conservation Trust. Woodroffe has a window in the South Aisle area which depicts Christ washing the disciples' feet and the healing of Jairus' daughter. The church is in Evesham, Worcestershire.

=== St Andrew's Church ===
This Fulham Fields church has a rood and beam designed by Aston Webb and reredos by Harry Hems. Woodroffe executed a window in the church's side chapel. The window is a memorial to a Mrs. Wright by her children.

=== St Andrew ===
Three-light window executed for this West Kensingtonchurch.

=== Our Lady of Compassion ===
Woodroffe executed a single-light window for this church in Formby Lancashire .

== Lost works ==
=== St Mary with St John ===
The foundation stone for the church in Edmonton, Greater London was laid on July 22, 1905, by Samuel Forde Ridley, MP. The church was designed by Charles Henry Bourne Quennell, whose wife painted the pictures on the pulpit in the church. Wodroffe executed some windows for the church but the church was demolished in 1954 to make way for road widening and a housing scheme, and Woodroffe's windows were lost.
