= St Ethelbert's Church, Slough =

St Ethelbert's Church
- Our Lady Immaculate and St Ethelbert's Church
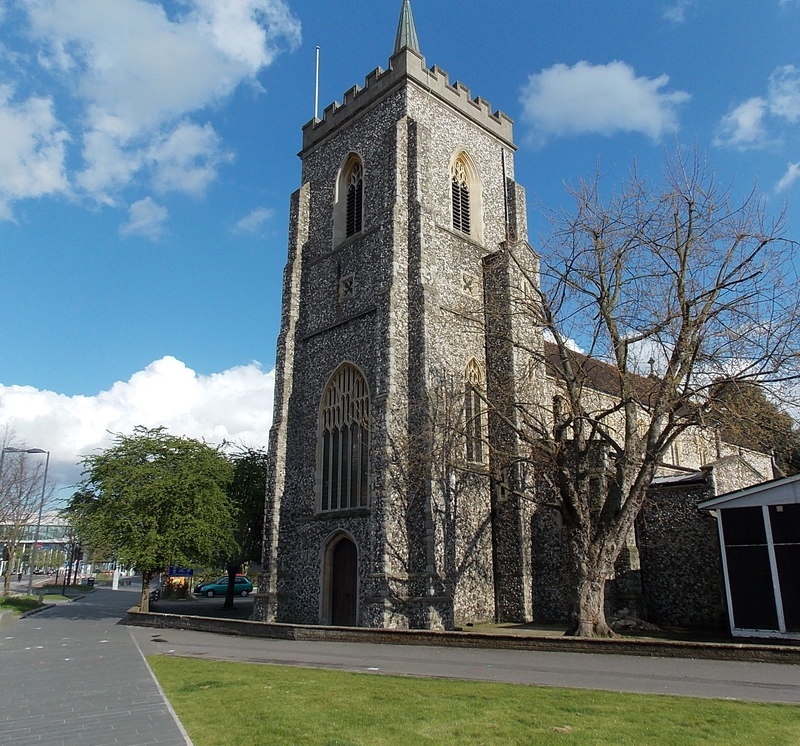
- St Ethelbert's Church
- 51.5101°N 0.5941°W
- OS grid reference: SU 97665 79953
- Location: Slough
- Country: England
- Denomination: Roman Catholic
- Website: St-Ethelberts.co.uk

History
- Status: Active
- Dedication: Mary, mother of Jesus; Æthelberht of Kent
- Events: 1885: First church

Architecture
- Functional status: Parish church
- Heritage designation: Grade II listed
- Designated: 3 August 1984
- Architect: Benedict Williamson
- Style: Gothic Revival
- Groundbreaking: 1 July 1908
- Completed: 20 April 1910

Administration
- Province: Westminster
- Diocese: Northampton
- Deanery: Slough
- Parish: Our Lady and St Ethelbert

St Ethelbert's Church or Our Lady Immaculate and St Ethelbert's Church is a Roman Catholic parish church in Slough, Berkshire, England. It was built from 1908 to 1910 and designed by Benedict Williamson. It is located on the corner of Wellington Street and William Street in the centre of the town. It is in the Gothic Revival style and is a Grade II listed building.

== History ==
=== Foundation ===
In the early 1880s, an Italian priest, Fr Joseph Clemente, became the chaplain at St James' School in Baylis House. While her was there he worked on getting a permanent Catholic church in the town. With others, he raised funds and bought a disused warehouse and stable on Herschel House. In 1885, the former warehouse and stable became St Ethelbert's Church.

=== Construction ===
In 1888, Fr Clemente moved permanently from the school to the church. The next year, in 1889, he bought the site of the present church for £1,050. However, raising funds for the construction of the church was more difficult. In 1908, thanks to a donation from the superior of the Bernardine Cistercians of Esquermes attached to St Bernard's Catholic Grammar School in Slough, in memory of her parents. On 1 July 1908, the foundation stone of the church was laid. The architect was the priest Fr Benedict Williamson who also designed St Ignatius Church, Stamford Hill and Our Lady of Perpetual Help Church, Fulham. He was assisted by Fr J. Francis Drake, the chaplain at the convent. The builders were Messrs. Godson & Sons. On 19 April 1910, the church was consecrated and opened the next day on 20 April 1910.

=== Developments ===
In 1912, the statue of Christ the Redeemer was bought for the church. It is situated by the side entrance facing the street. It was blessed by Pope Pius X and was originally designed to stand at Westminster Cathedral. In 1980, the rood screen was moved to behind the altar, the baptismal font was moved in front of the sanctuary and the ambo replaced the pulpit. The work was done by the architect Anthony New who worked for Seely & Paget.

== Parish ==
The church is its own parish and has three Sunday Masses at 9:00am, 11:00am and 6:30pm.

== See also ==
- Diocese of Northampton
- List of Catholic churches in the United Kingdom
