= A. H. Skipworth =

English architect (1861 – 1907)

Arthur Henry Skipworth (known as Henry Skipworth) (6 September 1861 – 12 April 1907) was an English architect, who mostly designed church fittings (particularly reredoses) as well as some churches.

== Early life ==
Skipworth was born in Bilsdale, Yorkshire in 1861. (Note: Skipworth's brother had been born in Croxby, Lincolnshire, and the records were subsequently confused in some of the literature.) He was the son of the Rev Arthur Bolland Skipworth and his wife Eliza Mary (née Browne). Arthur Bolland Skipworth was the rector of the parish, and a chess editor and notable player. Eliza Mary Browne was the daughter of George Browne of Nun Monkton Hall and a proctor of the Ecclesiastical court of York; her younger brother was the Rt Rev George Forrest Browne. His parents' marriage was unhappy, and by the early 1870s they had separated. When Arthur Bolland Skipworth died in 1898 he left nothing to his wife or his two sons, and everything to his married mistress. Young Henry was educated at Oakham, where his uncle, the Rev Grey Skipworth, was second master.

== Career ==
Skipworth was articled to G.F. Bodley of Bodley & Garner, remaining as his assistant thereafter. By 1889 he had established his own practice at 5 Staple Inn, London, sharing an office (but not a practice) with his fellow Bodley pupil Edward Prioleau Warren. Warren described him as "a consummate draughtsman of a minute and delicate order".

Most of his works which came to fruition were church fittings, with only a small number of churches and church restorations completed. He drew up plans for a number of churches that were not realised. Notably, these included a new chapel for the Community of the Resurrection in Mirfield (1906). His obituary in The Builder explained that "[h]is style of design was too original and too delicate and refined to appeal much to the average church committee". Other unrealised designs included churches for Cockington, Devon, and St Andrew's, Dearnley, Littleborough, Notts.

He was an entrant in the 1901-03 Liverpool Cathedral competition. Judged by Bodley and R Norman Shaw, Skipworth was noted as an honourable mention.

He was a Brother of the Art Workers' Guild from 1894 to 1902 and a Committee member of the Clergy and Artists' Association.

== List of works ==
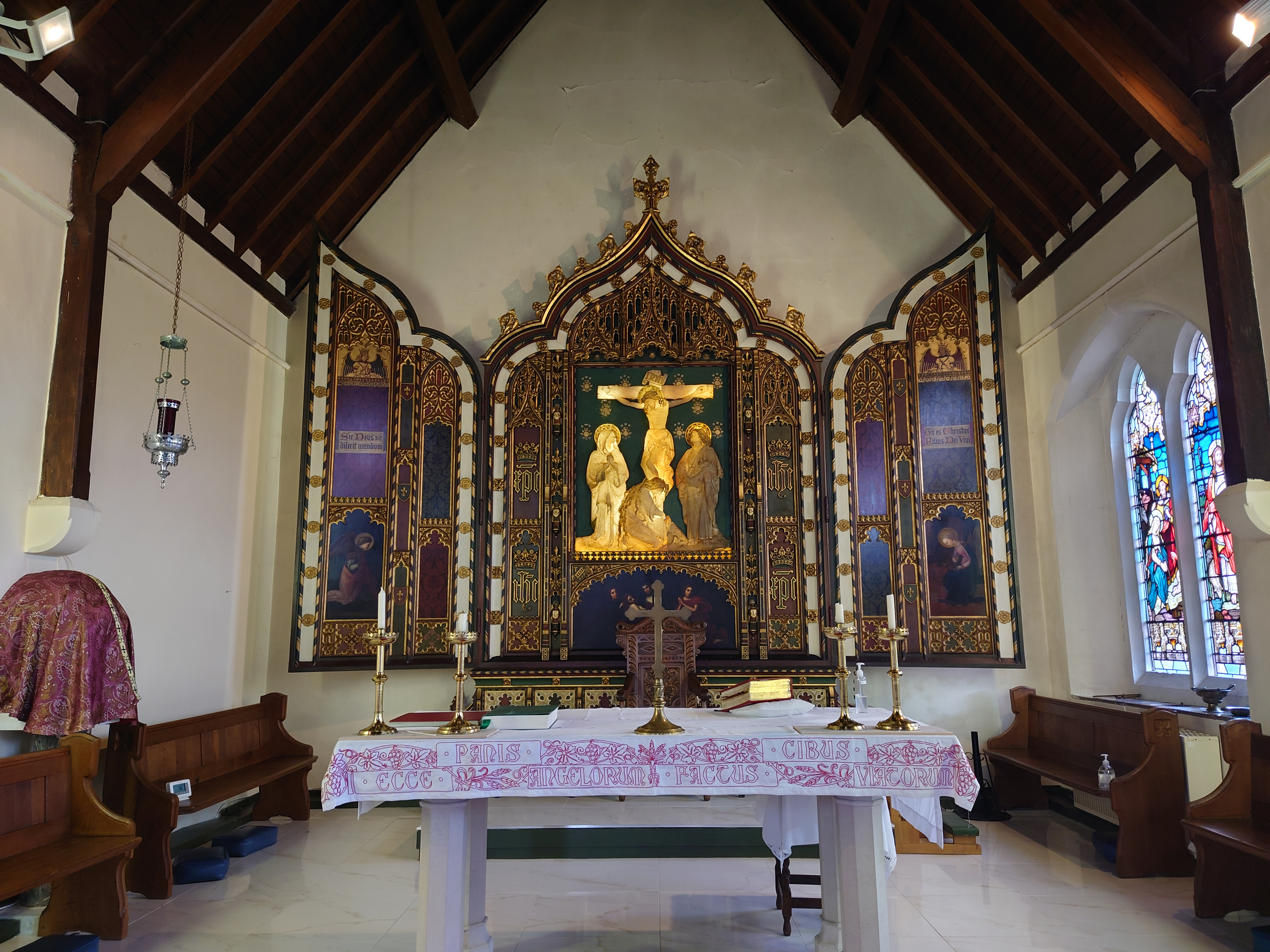
Reredos in Our Lady and St Benedict's Catholic Church, Wootton Wawen

- Reredos, Our Lady and St Benedict's Catholic Church, Wootton Wawen, Warks (1888). Skipworth designed a triptych reredos with alabaster figures, depicting the crucifixion and the annunciation, for St Leonard's, Newark, Notts, in 1888. In 1978 the church was closed and demolished, and the fittings were sold. It was acquired by and installed in Our Lady and St Benedict's Catholic Church, Wootton Wawen.
- Reredos, St Mary's, Elvetham, Hartfordbridge, Hants (1889); since removed.
- Restoration, All Saints', Earsham, Norfolk (1890). The reredos is by Skipworth's friend and collaborator, Reginald Hallward.

Reredos in St Radegund's Church, Grayingham

- Reredos, St Radegund's, Grayingham, Lincs (1892). The reredos has a copper gilt relief of the crucifixion by Conrad Dressler.

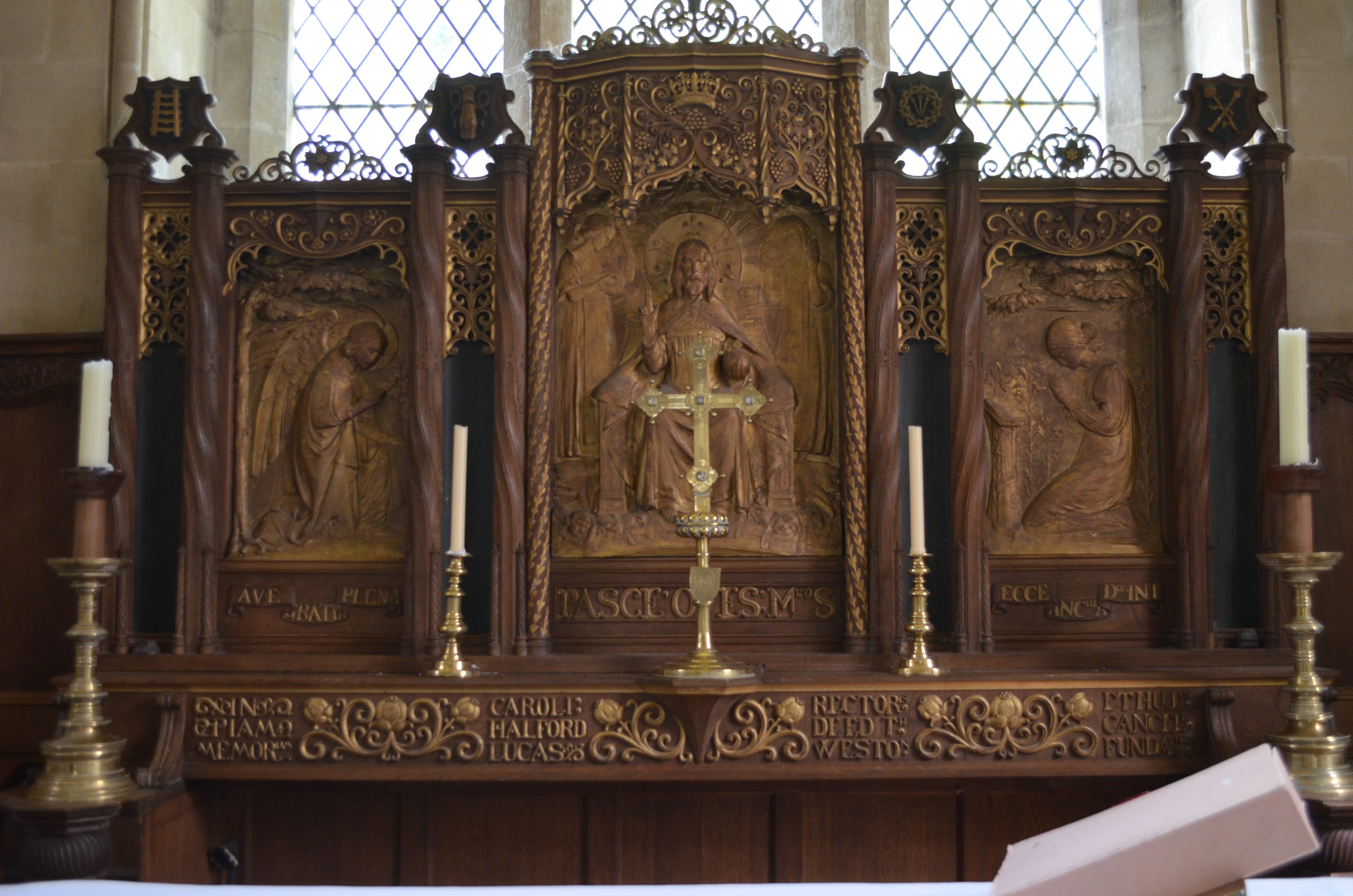
Reredos in St Mary's Church, Edith Weston

- Reredos, St Mary's, Edith Weston, Rutland (1896). The reredos is of gilded oak, with panels by the sculptor Sir George Frampton; it is a memorial to the Rev Charles Halford Lucas.
- Church fittings for St Alban's, Teddington (1896); all since lost during the period of closure from 1977 to 1995. Skipworth designed a banner and a pulpit, the latter with figure panels by Reginald Hallward, a reredos for the south transept, and the organ-case (for an organ built by Lewis & Co).
- St Etheldreda's, Fulham (1896-97); destroyed in WWII and replaced by a church to a design by Guy Briscoe. The altar was sited 17 steps above the nave, providing space for a crypt under the chancel.
- Possibly the reredos, Holy Trinity Catholic Church, Dorchester (1897). Holy Trinity was an Anglican church which was transferred to the Catholic Church in 1976. The reredos was an Anglican fitting. It is recorded as having come from Oberammergau, but also variously by C.E. Kempe, Bodley or Skipworth.

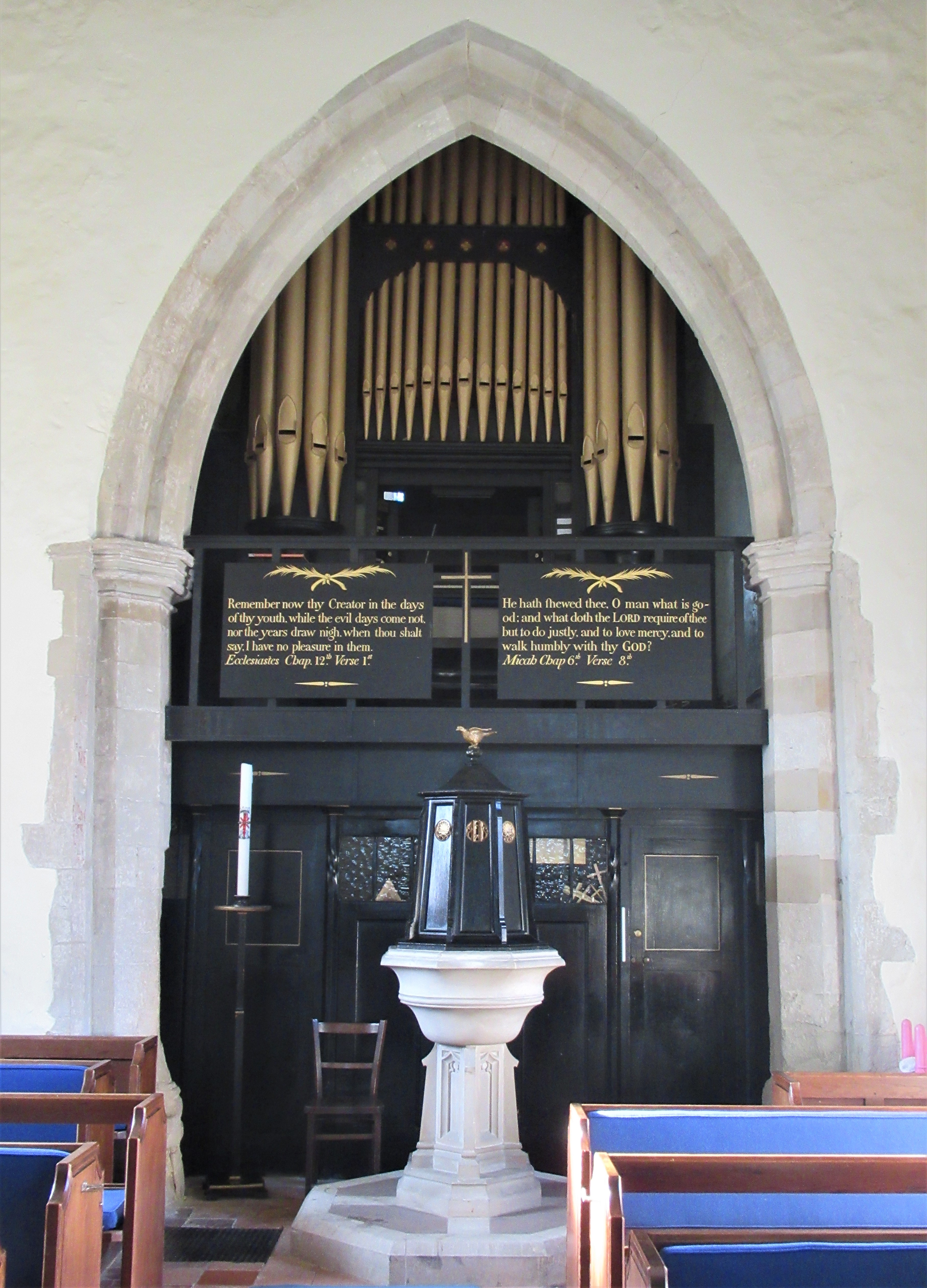
Font and cover in St Mary's Church, Udimore

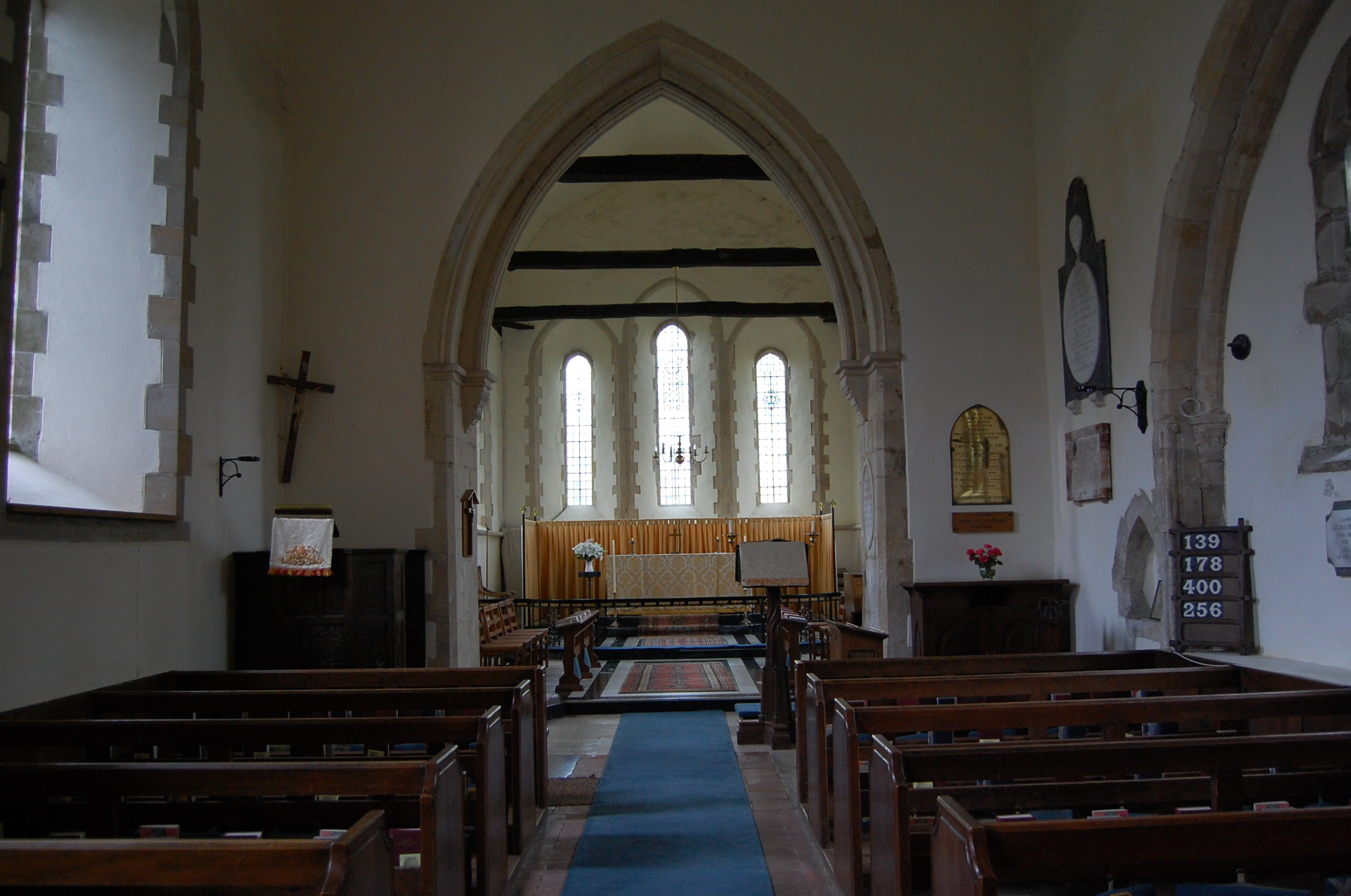
Pulpit (left) in St Mary's Church, Udimore

- Restoration of St Mary's, Udimore, East Sussex (1897-1903). Skipworth also designed the font cover and pulpit.
- Chancel screen, All Saints', Fulham (1898). The chancel screen is of wrought iron.
- The altar, retable and hangings for the Lady Chapel, Rochester Cathedral (1899); all since removed.
- Churchyard cross, St Andrew's, Leasingham, near Sleaford, Lincs (1902). The cross is a memorial to the Rt Rev Edward Trollope, Bishop of Nottingham, Archdeacon of Stow and, for 50 years, Rector of the parish.
- New Rectory, Ingrave, Essex (1905-06); now demolished.
- Restoration of St Andrew's, Nuthurst, completed after his death by John Samuel Alder The organ was rebuilt at the same time by Bishop & Son, and it is likely that Skipworth & Alder were responsible for the organ case. Skipworth refitted the chancel and added the vestry on the north side of the nave.

== Personal life ==
He died in 1907 in Hampstead, aged 45, having suffered ill health for many years, including diabetes, which, before the discovery of insulin, resulted in reduced life expectancy. That ill-health required him to winter abroad. He was unmarried, although his friend and former colleague Edward Warren reported that in his last few months he had become engaged to be married, without identifying the fiancée. He lived in Shorne, near Gravesend.
