= Avebury Priory =

Alien house of Benedictine monks in Wiltshire, England

Coordinates: 51°25′43″N 01°51′33″W

Avebury Priory was an alien house of Benedictine monks in Wiltshire, England, between the early 12th century and the Dissolution.

William de Tancarville, chamberlain to Henry I, granted an Avebury estate (which he had recently received from the King) to the Abbey of Saint-Georges, Boscherville, Normandy in 1114, and a priory was established at Avebury soon afterwards. It was one of two such cells in England: William had also donated the church and manor at Edith Weston, Rutland, in or before the same year, leading to the establishment of Edith Weston Priory. At Avebury the monks did not have control of the parish church which was held by Cirencester Abbey, causing disputes over tithes in the next century.

An inventory made in 1324 found around 600 sheep, two horses and two beds; the abbey typically had three or four monks in England, divided between Avebury and Edith Weston. Most foreign monks were expelled in 1378, and thereafter the land was tenanted by a succession of royal servants who undertook to provide a chaplain to conduct services. In 1411 the lands were granted to the collegiate church at Fotheringhay, Northamptonshire, which held them until the Dissolution in the 1530s.

The names of priors are recorded sporadically between 1336 and 1377, and are listed in the Victoria County History.

The house on the site of the monks' manor house is known as Avebury Manor and since 1991 has been owned by the National Trust. Parts of the Grade I listed house date from c.1557.
