= Henry Southwell =

Henry Southwell may refer to:

- Henry Southwell (politician) (1700–1758), Irish MP for Limerick County
- Henry Southwell (bishop) (1860–1937), Anglican Bishop of Lewes
- Harry Southwell (cricketer) (1830–1890), English cricketer
