= Hugh Arnold =

English stained glass artist

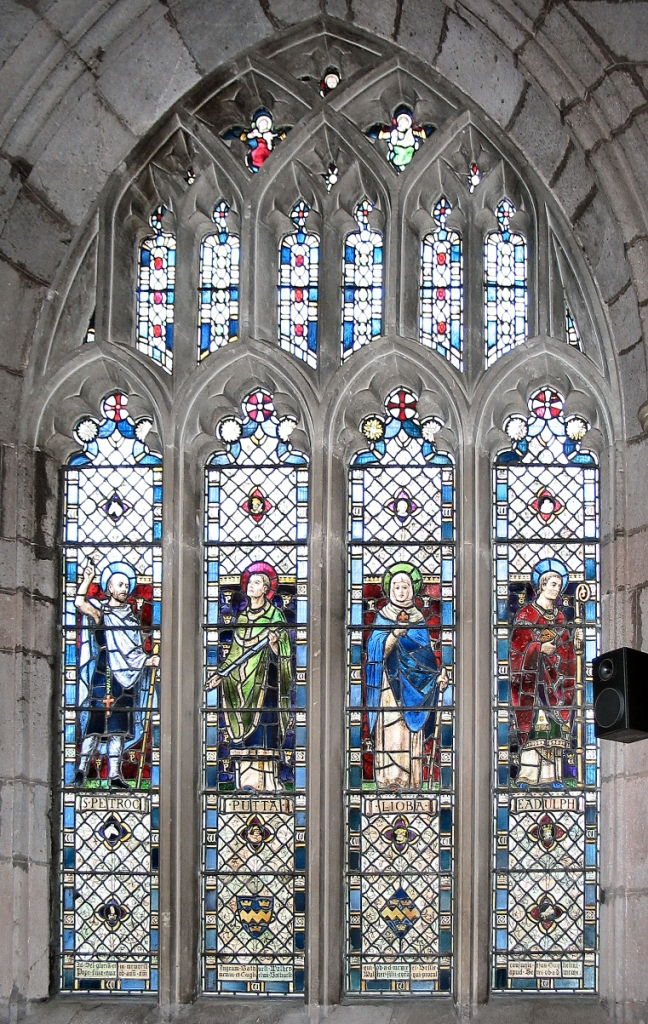
- Church of the Holy Cross, Crediton window
- Born: 1872; Wimbledon, England
- Died: 11 August 1915 (aged 42–43); Gallipoli, Turkey
- Education: Trained under Christopher Whall
- Known for: Stained Glass, Writer
- Notable work: See below

Hugh Arnold (1872 – 11 August 1915) was an English stained glass artist. Arnold was educated at the Slade School of Fine Art before attending the London County Council (LCC) Central School of Arts and Crafts where he studied under Christopher Whall from 1989 to 1903. He designed stained glass windows for James Powell & Sons and also did some independent work. Arnold died at Gallipoli while an officer in the Northumberland Fusiliers.

Some of Arnold's works were:

- St Cuthbert in Kirkby-in-Furness, Cumbria – This church has an Arnold window in the chancel area which depicts St Aidan and St Cuthbert.
- St Barnabas in Great Tey, Essex – In 1900 a window which was made by James Powell & Sons to Arnold's design. It is a five-light window east window which depicted angels.
- St John the Baptist in Wimbledon, Outer London – In 1914 another Arnold-designed window was executed by James Powell & Sons. It is a two-light window in the south side of the nave. The window was created in memory of Charles Thomas Arnold, Hugh's father, who was one of the first trustees of the church. In one light, Arnold depicts Christ in Gethsemane with an angel and includes the text "Not my will, but thine be done". In the other light The Last Supper is depicted with the text "This is my blood which is shed for you".
- Holy Trinity in Coalbrookdale, Shropshire – In 1902 James Powell & Sons executed an Arnold-designed three-light window in the south east area of the church.
- Church of the Holy Cross in Crediton, Devon – In 1913 Arnold designed windows that reflected the church's history. The parish church dates mainly to the 15th century but has some 12th- and 13th-century remnants. In a roundel, Arnold depicts the Anglo-Saxon Cathedral which Eadulph had begun to build on the site of the present church. Below is another roundel where the Charter granted by King Edward the Elder is depicted. The coats of arms of the donors, Mr. and Miss Ingram Walker, are included in the design. Hugh Arnold was their brother-in-law. The window's inscription records that the window is in memory of Ingram Bathurst Walker and Bessie, his wife, the daughter of William Pope, and Wiliam Bathhurst Walker, their son.
- Holy Trinity, in Millom, Cumbria – In the Huddleston chapel there is a three light window depicting the archangels Gabriel, Michael and Raphael created by Hugh Arnold in 1908 as a memorial to John & Jane Harker of Salthouse Farm.
- Wythburn Church in St John's, Castlerigg and Wythburn, Cumbria – Hugh Arnold east window dating to 1906 which depicts St Peter.
- St Mary in Edith Weston, Rutland – There are Arnold-designed windows in the chancel.
- St Padarn in St Padarn's Church, Llanbadarn Fawr, Ceredigion – An Arnold window, created in 1904, is in the south wall of the nave. It is entitled "Justice, Wisdom, Reverence and Love". The text around the window reads - "The path of the just is as the shining light that shineth more and more unto the perfect day". The inscription beneath the figure and above and below the dedication reads "For Christ His Sake; Ubi Thesaurus Ibi Cor". The window was given in memory of Griffith Humphrey Pugh Evans, Knight (1840–1902).
- All Saints, Nynehead – Arnold carried out work on the church's armorial window.

Some of his windows are on display at the Stained Glass Museum at Ely, being lancet windows depicting Queen Victoria and Edward VII which Arnold made in 1910 for St Mary Magdalene in Barnstaple, Devon.

== Other work ==
Arnold wrote a booklet on the stained glass of Balliol College Chapel. He was also the author of a study of medieval glass published in 1913 titled Stained Glass of the Middle Ages in England and France.

== Life ==
Arnold was the son of Charles Thomas and Annie Jane Arnold. His father was a solicitor. His mother was the sister of architect Thomas Graham Jackson. He was the husband of Mary Leslie Arnold née Walker, of 85, Bedford Gardens, Kensington, London.

Arnold volunteered at the start of the First World War in August 1914 and was commissioned in December 1915. Lieutenant Arnold of the 8th (Service) Battalion, the Northumberland Fusiliers, died on active service at Gallipoli in August 1915. His name appears on the Helles Memorial which commemorates the 20,956 Commonwealth servicemen of the Gallipoli campaign with no known grave.

Some of his paintings are in Wimbledon Museum.
