= Edith Weston Priory =

Alien house of Benedictine monks in Edith Weston, Rutland

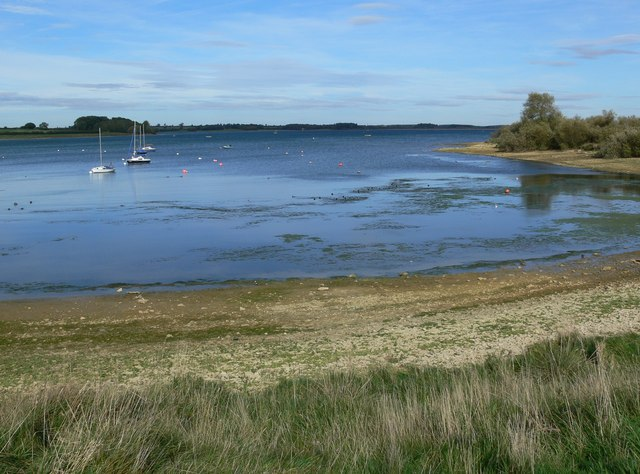
- Where the priory once stood is now this shallow bay in Rutland Water

- Location within Rutland
- Interactive map of Edith Weston Priory

Monastery information
- Order: Benedictine
- Established: 1114
- Disestablished: 1394
- Mother house: Abbey of Saint-Georges, Boscherville, France
- Diocese: Diocese of Lincoln

Site
- Location: Edith Weston, Rutland, England
- Coordinates: 52.6405°N 0.6347°W

Edith Weston Priory was a small alien house of Benedictine monks in Edith Weston, Rutland. The French parent house of Abbey of Saint-Georges, Boscherville was founded by Ralf de Tanquerville, chamberlain to William the Conqueror, about the year 1050. By 1114 his son William donated the church and manor at Edith Weston, and a small cell of monks was set up to collect the rents and intercede for the founder's soul.

The cell was one of two in England: William founded Avebury Priory in Wiltshire around the same time. Like all alien houses, control (and revenues) passed to the Crown in time of war with France, and it was during one of these periods that the priory closed. The last known Prior was in 1361, and by 1394 the church and manor had been sold to St. Anne's Priory, Coventry, bringing the priory to an end.

Pevsner was dismissive of the priory, saying that Brooke Priory was the only monastery in Rutland as "Edith Weston hardly counts as one".

The earthwork remains probably now lie below the waters of Rutland Water.

== Priors of Edith Weston ==
Only a few names are known:

- John, 1295–1298
- Hugh de Altifago, 1324–1326
- Robert de Cunebaud, 1339–1355
- William de Beauvey, 1355
- Robert, 1361
- John, 1375, 1379

Robert de Cunebaud is known as a delinquent whose abuses were used to justify widespread suspicion of alien cells
