= St Casimir's Lithuanian Church =

St. Casimir's Lithuanian Church
- Roman Catholic Church of St Casimir
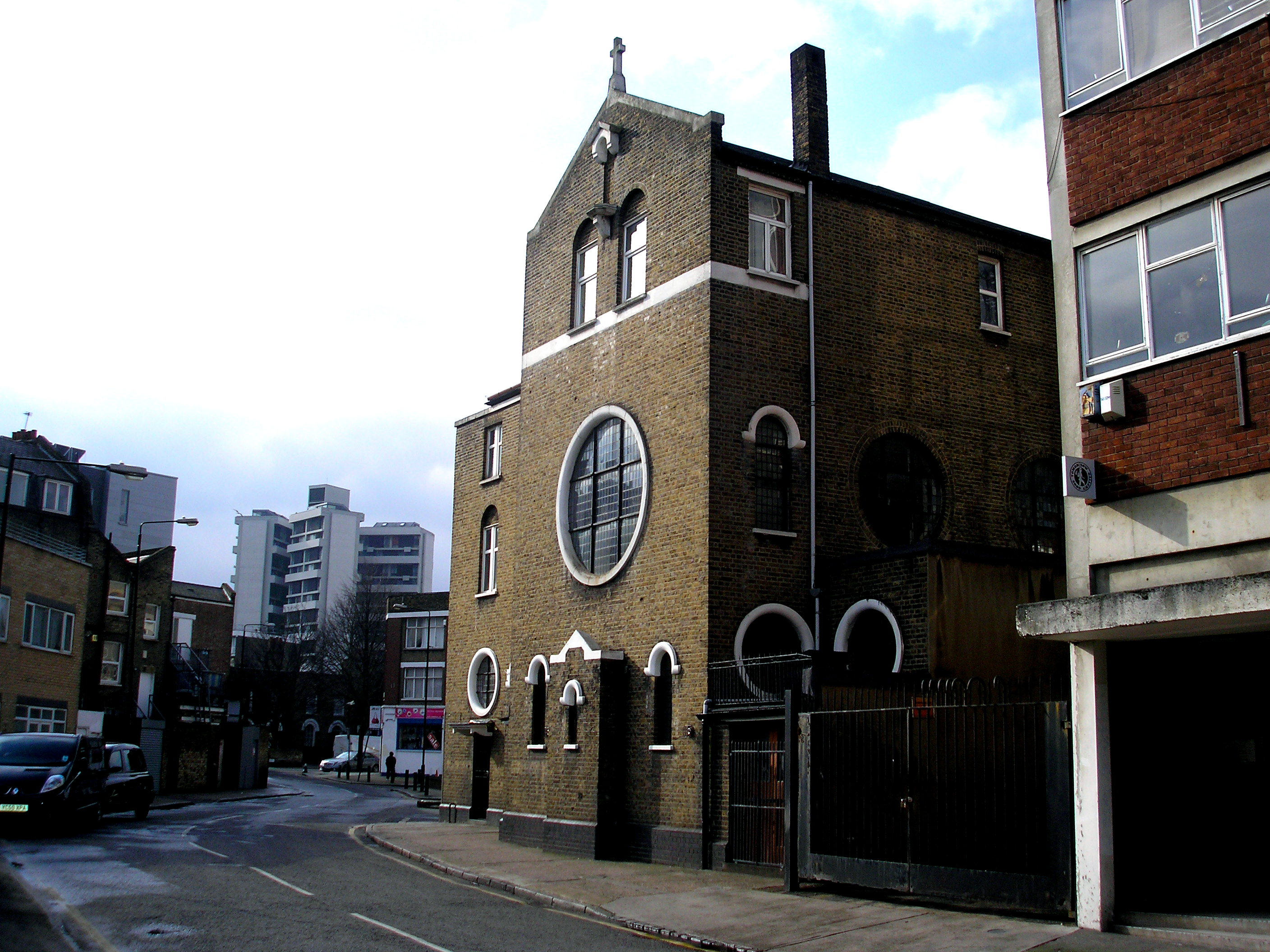
- St. Casimir's Lithuanian Church
- 51°31′58″N 0°03′34″W
- Location: London
- Country: England
- Denomination: Roman Catholic

History
- Dedicated: 1912

Architecture
- Architect: Benedict Williamson

Administration
- Diocese: Westminster

Clergy
- Priest: Petras Tverijonas

St Casimir's Lithuanian Church is in Bethnal Green, London, England.

== History ==
The mission was founded in 1901, with a church on the corner of Christian Street and Cable Street. Fr Boleslas Szlamas had his quarters at 197 Whitechapel Road. The present church dates from ten years later, during the rectorate of Fr Casimir G. Matulaitis. It was opened by Cardinal Bourne on 10 March 1912. The Mass on this occasion was said by Fr Benedict Williamson, who was the architect of the church. For the Lithuanians, Williamson designed a building of London stock brick.

== Architecture ==
Detail of church interior

Beyond a south-east porch, the layout of the church is easily read, with nave, aisles and chancel all within three bays. There are no aisle windows, but circular windows appear in the north wall and throughout clerestory. The interior is dominated by the huge, cheerful, brightly painted altarpiece depicting the Coronation of Our Lady carved in wood. It is said, though it is much disputed, that it was shown at the Great Exhibition of 1851 as an example of Tyrolean craftsmanship and was, at one time, destined for Westminster Cathedral. Our Lady is attended by angels in various attitudes in piety and prayer. A golden, winged crown hovers above Her head. The seated figures of Christ and God the Father look on from above and behind Her. The Holy Spirit in the form of a dove sheds rays of light out towards cherubim who are half concealed in the clouds that form the background of the whole tableau. Father Williamson's taste is less evident in other parts of the church. The statue of St. Casimir located to the right of the altar is a piece of fine art made in Lithuania from Ancaster limestone by famous Lithuanian sculptor Antanas Žukauskas in 2009.
