= Paul Woodroffe =

British book illustrator and stained-glass artist

Paul Vincent Woodroffe (25 January 1875 – 7 May 1954) was a British book illustrator and stained-glass artist.

== Early life ==
Woodroffe was born in Madras (present-day Chennai), one of nine children of Francis Henry Woodroffe, a judge in the Madras Civil Service, and his wife Elizabeth (née Dunman). The family returned to England in 1882 when his father died. In 1887, Paul was sent to Stonyhurst College.

In November 1892 he sat and passed the entrance examinations for the Royal Military Academy at Woolwich, but in that year there were more successful applicants than places available, and he enrolled instead as a full-time student at the Slade School of Fine Art in Bloomsbury. At this time the family lived in Alton Castle in Alton in Staffordshire, sharing it with another Catholic family, the Moorats. Joseph Samuel Moorat (1864–1938) was an accomplished writer of songs, and his music was said to have been the inspiration for much of Woodroffe's work as an illustrator.

== Early work ==
Woodroffe's first illustrated book, entitled Ye Booke of Nursery Rhymes, was published in 1895 whilst he was still at the Slade, and on leaving the Slade he concentrated on further book illustration and then stained glass, and was to work with books and windows for the rest of his life. Woodroffe was a prolific illustrator. His work included illustrations of Shakespeare, Bible stories, children's books, and illustrations of Roman history. In the late 1890s he worked as a pupil of the stained-glass artist, Christopher Whall. His earliest commission for stained glass is thought to have been in 1901 for St John's Catholic Church at Alton in Staffordshire. Like all of Woodroffe's windows prior to 1905, this window would have been made in the workshop of Lowndes and Drury of Park Walk in Chelsea. Woodroffe made full use of "slab glass".

In 1902, Woodroffe was elected a member of the Art Workers' Guild. 1902 was a seminal year for Woodroffe as this was the year that Charles Robert Ashbee's Guild of Handicraft and Essex House Press moved from the East End to Chipping Campden in the Cotswolds where Woodroffe had been a frequent visitor from the mid-1890s when Joseph and Lilian Moorat had acquired a house at Westington, just outside Chipping Campden. While staying with the Moorats Woodroffe would use a small thatched cottage nearby as a studio. When the Moorats left Westington in 1904, Woodroffe purchased the cottage, employed Ashbee to enlarge and adapt it to include a small studio and he moved into the house in November 1904 and was to live there for more than thirty years.

== Later career ==
It was in 1909 that Woodroffe was to receive his most important commission when he was asked to design and make fifteen windows for the Lady Chapel of St Patrick's Cathedral in New York. The first window was made and installed in 1912, but the outbreak of war in 1914 and the enlistment of many of Woodroffe's staff temporarily interrupted the work.

Another more unusual commission at this time was to design windows for the private attic chapel of the American actress Mary Anderson, who settled in Court Farm, Worcestershire, after enormous success on the London stage in the 1880s. During the Great War, Woodroffe served as an Assistant Inspector in the Ministry of Munitions based at Derby. After the war, the studio went back to working on the New York commission. Woodroffe also managed to do illustrations for the Shakespeare Head Press run by his friend Bernard Newdigate. Woodroffe and Newdigate had been pupils together at Stonyhurst. His last recorded work was that in 1945 for a Roman Catholic church at Camberley, Surrey. The New York commission was completed in 1934. In 1935, Woodroffe moved to Jayne's Court, Bisley near Stroud, where he continued to accept commissions for stained glass. In 1939 he moved to Coaxdon Hall at Axminster, Dorset, where he lived for the duration of the Second World War.

== Family ==
In 1907 Woodroffe married Dorothy Lynch-Staunton, the daughter of a local landowner. They had four children. Two daughters died in infancy and there were two sons, Martin and Michael.

Martin F. Woodroffe stood as the New Party candidate for the Chatham Division in the 1931 General Election.

== Death ==
In the early 1950s Woodroffe and his wife moved to Berkley Cottage at Mayfield in Sussex. Paul Woodroffe died in Eastbourne on 7 May 1954.

== List of stained-glass works ==
=== England ===
- St. Paul's Church, Bedford, Bedfordshire
- St. Michael's Church, Macclesfield, Cheshire
- St. Mary and St. Michael's Church, Great Urswick, Cumbria
- Our Lady of Lourdes and St. Joseph Church, Leigh-on-Sea, Essex
- The Wilson, Cheltenham, Gloucestershire
- St. Catherine's RC Church, Chipping Campden, Gloucestershire
- Woolstaplers' Hall, Chipping Campden, Gloucestershire
- St. John the Evangelist Church, Brentford, Greater London
- St. Andrew's Church, Fulham, Greater London
- St. Ignatius Church, Stamford Hill, Greater London
- Church of the Holy Name of Jesus, Manchester, Greater Manchester
- St. Joseph's RC Church, Bishop's Stortford, Hertfordshire
- St. Dunstan's Church, Cranbrook, Kent
- St. Mary's Church, Goudhurst, Kent
- Stonyhurst College, Stonyhurst, Lancashire
- St. Matthew's Church, Sutton Bridge, Lincolnshire
- Our Lady of Compassion RC Church, Formby, Merseyside
- Church of the Holy Trinity, Caister-on-Sea, Norfolk
- Church of St. Mary the Virgin, Edith Weston, Rutland
- Church of the Holy Trinity, Hadley, Shropshire
- St. John's RC Church, Alton, Staffordshire
- St. Mary's Church, Uttoxeter, Staffordshire
- St. Ethelbert's Church, Herringswell, Suffolk
- St. Mary's Church, Frensham, Surrey
- Church of Our Lady and St. Peter, Leatherhead, Surrey
- St. John's RC Church, Trowbridge, Wiltshire
- St. Lawrence's Church, Evesham, Worcestershire
- Christ Church, Oakworth, West Yorkshire

=== Wales ===
- St. Mary's Church, Pembroke Dock, Pembrokeshire
