= Benedict Williamson =

British architect and Roman Catholic priest

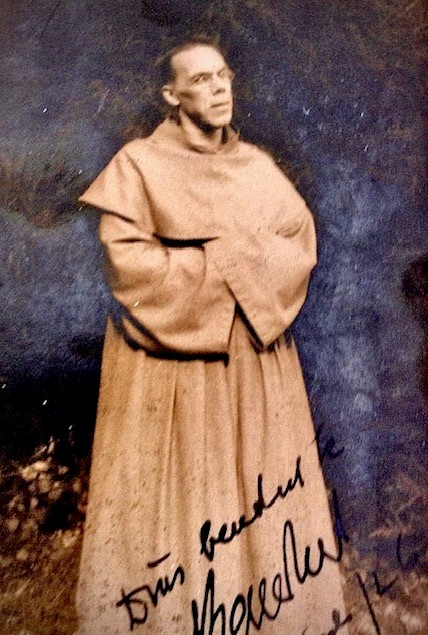
- Born: William Edward Williamson; 6 June 1868; London
- Died: October 1948 (aged 80); Rome
- Occupations: Priest, architect

Ecclesiastical career
- Religion: Christianity
- Church: Roman Catholic Church
- Ordained: 1909
- Congregations served: St Gregory's Catholic Church, Earlsfield (1909-1915)

Benedict Williamson (1868–1948) was an architect who designed many Romanesque Revival churches in the United Kingdom who later became a Roman Catholic priest.

== Early life ==
He was born in 1868 as William Edward Williamson in London. He studied law for a time and then went on to train as an architect in the office of Newman & Jacques, architects and surveyors in Stratford. In 1896, he was received into the Catholic church in the Church of the Immaculate Conception run by the Jesuits in Mayfair. There he took the name Benedict Williamson.

== Architect ==
For the next ten years he practised as an architect, being in a partnership with John Henry Foss calling the business Williamson & Foss.

In 1903, he did extension work for St Michael's Abbey in Farnborough. He designed the tower in the style of the Solesmes Abbey. The design was for four towers, which were to overshadow the red-brick house, but the First World War put an end to construction.

In 1906, he designed the Church of St Boniface in Tooting for the Archdiocese of Southwark. The original inspiration for the church came from Tre Fontane Abbey, but he progressed away from the prototype plan. The foundation stone was laid on 17 November 1906 and the church, still unfinished, was opened for worship on 18 April 1907. It was the last church he designed before going to Rome, because that year he entered the Beda College in Rome where he studied for the priesthood and was ordained in 1909 for the Archdiocese of Southwark.

He still continued to do architectural work while he was a priest. In 1911, he did work for the Jesuits, designing St Ignatius Church in Stamford Hill, London. Five years later, he was the architect for the Diocese of Northampton, designing Our Lady Immaculate and St Ethelbert's Church, Slough and Sacred Heart Church, in Southwold, Suffolk.

In 1912 he designed St Casimir's Lithuanian Church in Cambridge Heath, London. For the Lithuanians, Williamson designed a building of London stock brick whose walls are punctuated by large round windows.

After the First World War, in 1922, he was behind the building of Our Lady of Perpetual Help Church in Fulham, London. At the time he was inspired by the discovery of Tutankhamun's tomb that year and incorporated Egyptian patterns into the interior design of the church.

In 1927, in collaboration with his original partner John Foss, he helped with the completion of St Boniface's Church in Tooting, adding a tower, arches and Egyptian designs.

== Author ==
In 1921 he published Supernatural Mysticism, an enthusiastic book of some 260 pages, which carries a commendatory Introduction by Cardinal Bourne, Archbishop of Westminster. In later life he became a supporter of the Italian leader Benito Mussolini and wrote the introduction to a book about him A Revolution and its Leader by Augusto Turati (London, 1930). He died in 1948 at the age of 80 in Rome. An appreciation of his life was written by Henry Edward George Rope, a fellow convert who, in 1915, had taken over the editorship of The Catholic Review of which Benedict Williamson had been the founding editor two years earlier.

He also wrote a book about the Lateran Treaty of 1929, called The Treaty of the Lateran.

== Gallery ==
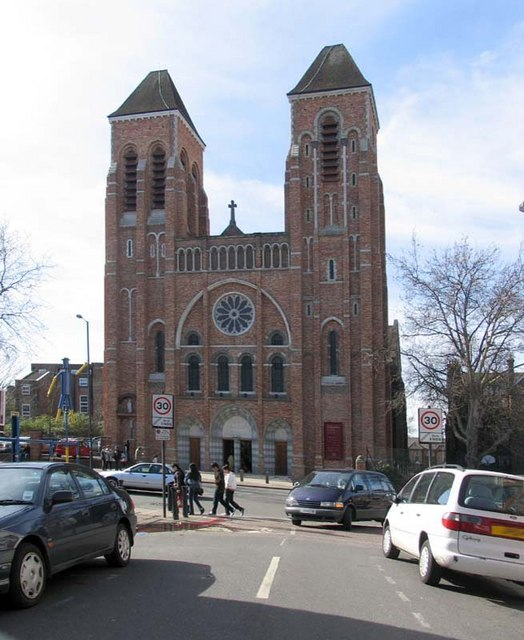
St Ignatius Church, Stamford Hill

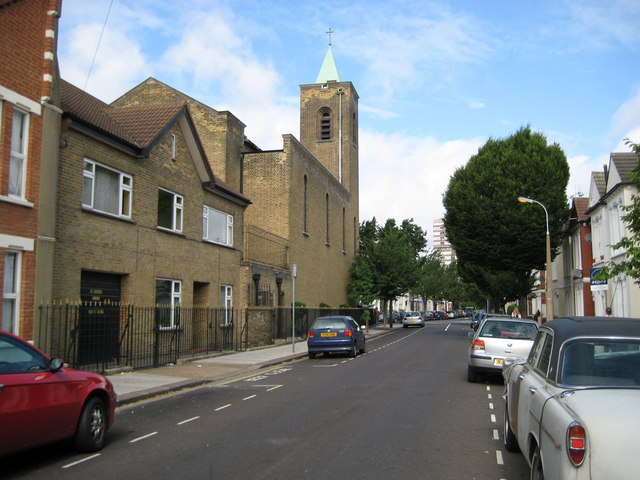
Our Lady of Perpetual Help Church, Fulham

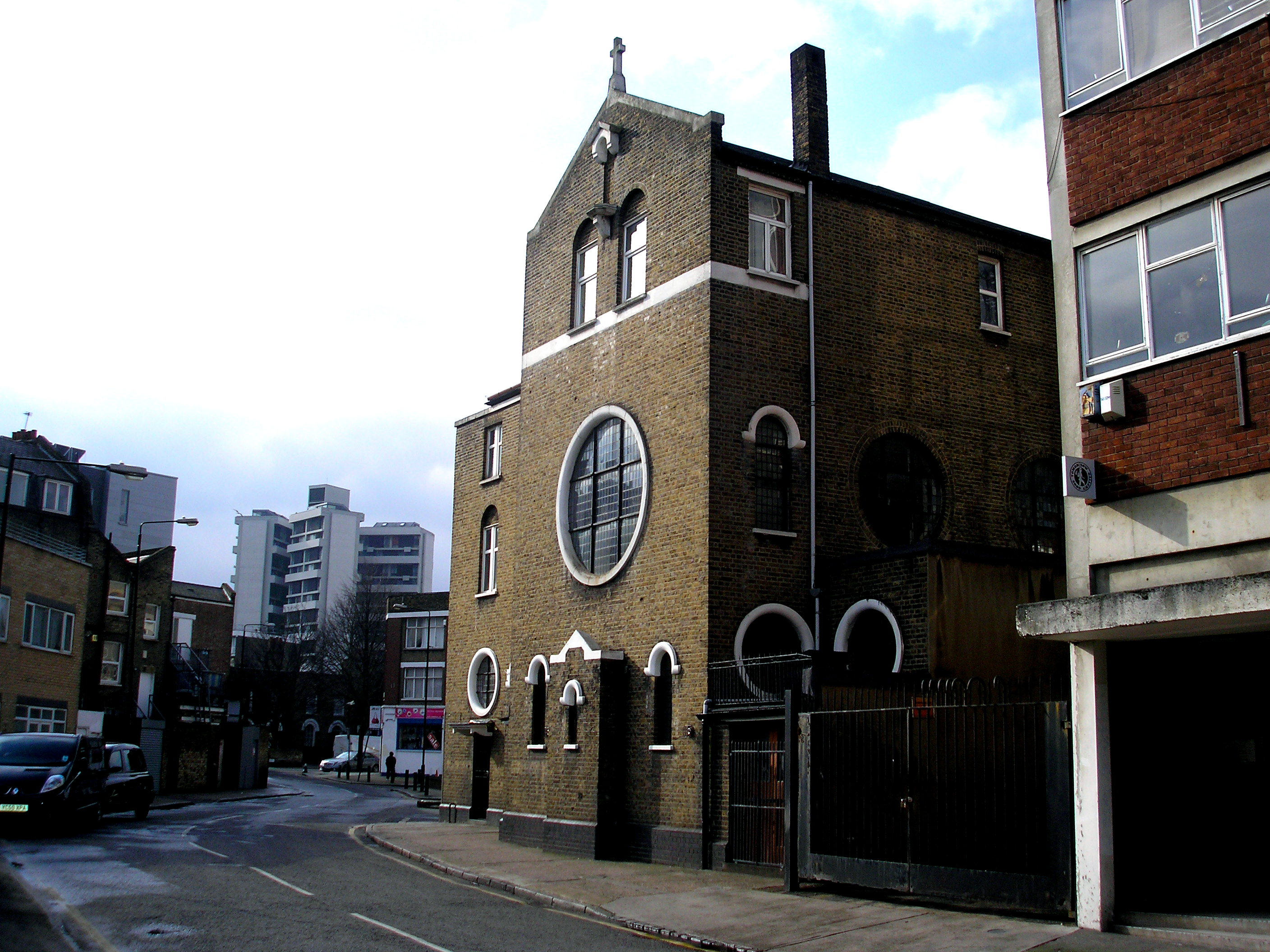
St Casimir's Lithuanian Church, Bethnal Green

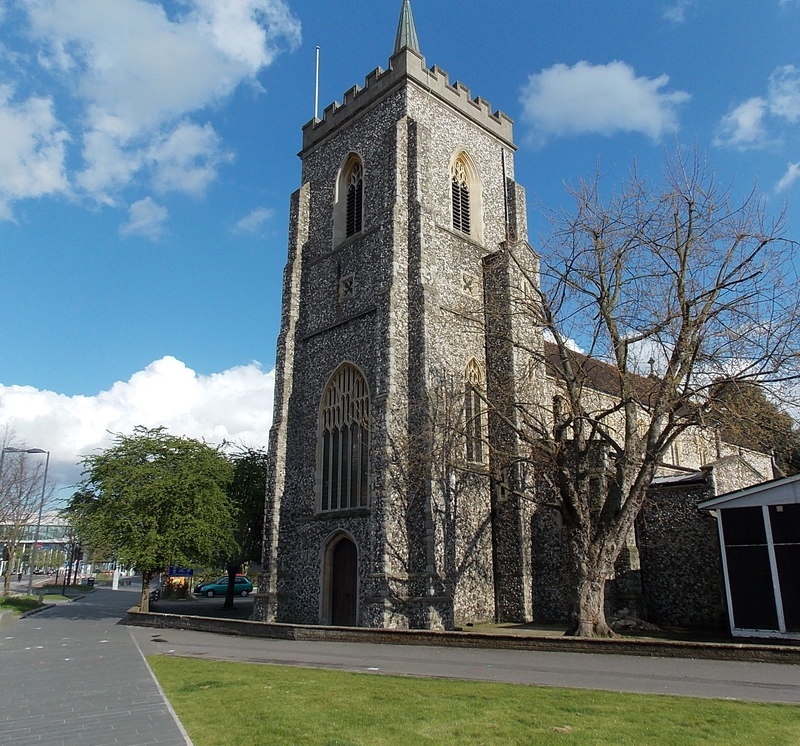
Our Lady Immaculate and St Ethelbert's Church, Slough

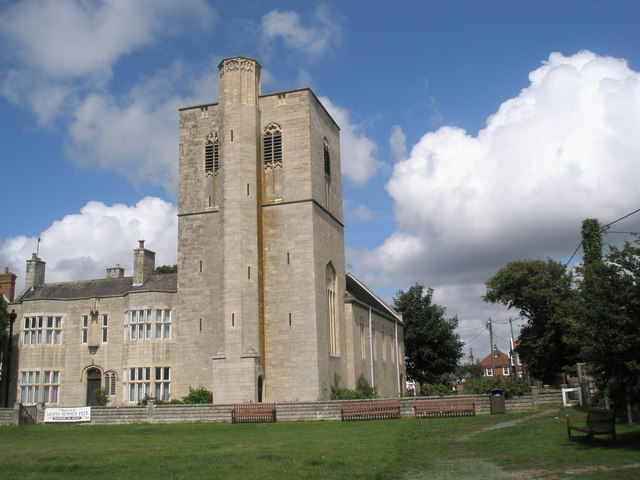
Sacred Heart Church, Southwold
