= Church of Our Lady and St Peter, Leatherhead =

Coordinates: 51.300000°N 0.324579°W

Church of Our Lady and St Peter
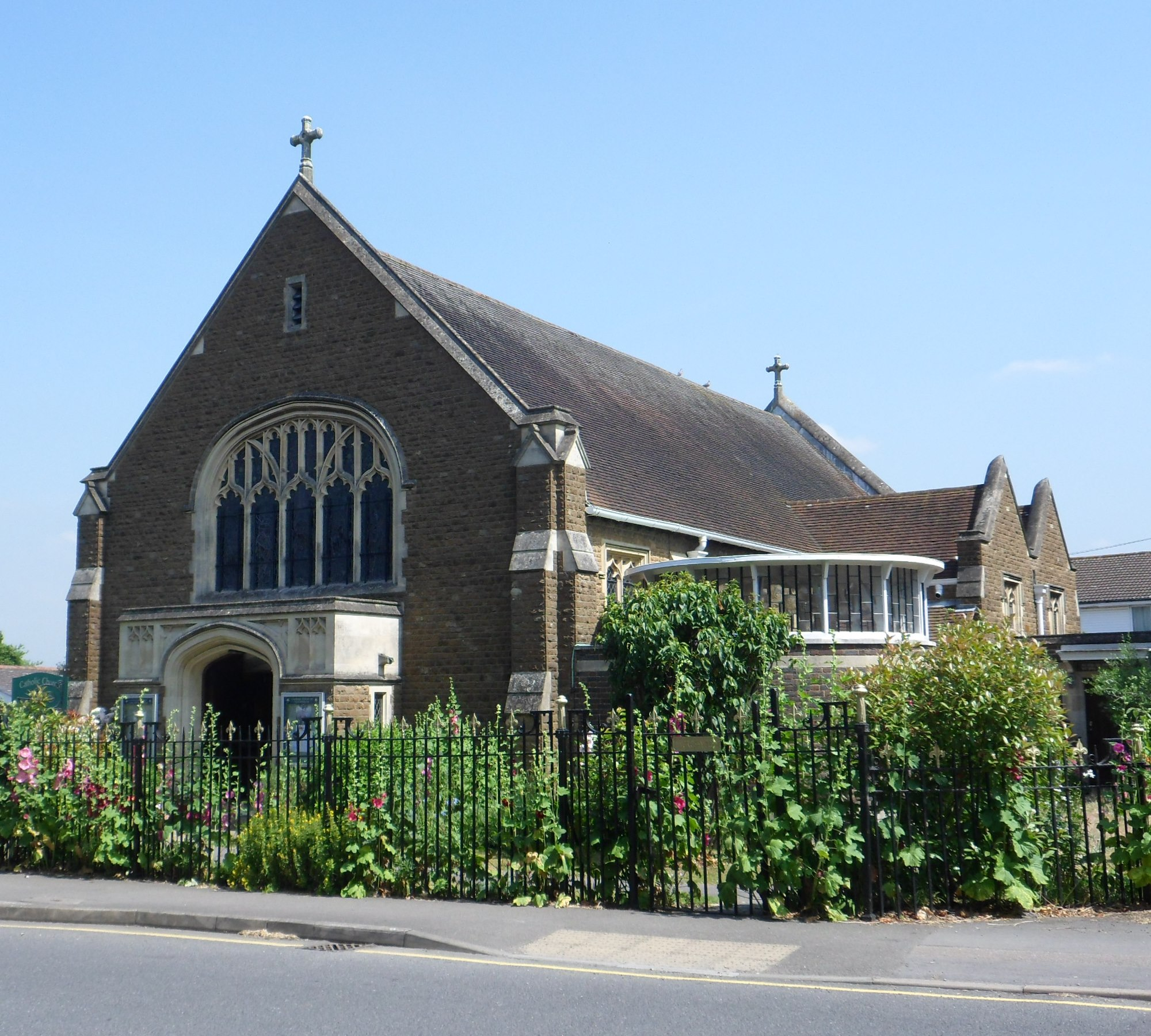
- The church from the southwest

- Location within Surrey
- OS grid reference: TQ 16900 56985
- Location: Leatherhead, Surrey
- Country: England
- Denomination: Roman Catholic
- Website: LeatherheadCatholics.org.uk

History
- Status: Active
- Founded: 6 November 1915
- Founder: Fr Bernard Kelly
- Dedication: Blessed Virgin Mary; Saint Peter

Architecture
- Functional status: Parish church
- Architect: Joseph Goldie
- Groundbreaking: July 1922
- Completed: 24 June 1923

Administration
- Province: Southwark
- Diocese: Arundel and Brighton
- Deanery: Epsom

Clergy
- Bishop: Monsignor Richard Moth
- Priest: Fr Michael Masterton OBE

The Church of Our Lady and St Peter is a Roman Catholic church in Leatherhead, Surrey. It was founded as a local chapel during the First World War and later became a Parish church. It is situated between Copthorne Road and Garlands Road on the junction with St John's Avenue in Leatherhead. It is the only Catholic church in Leatherhead and is served by the Diocese of Arundel and Brighton.

== History ==
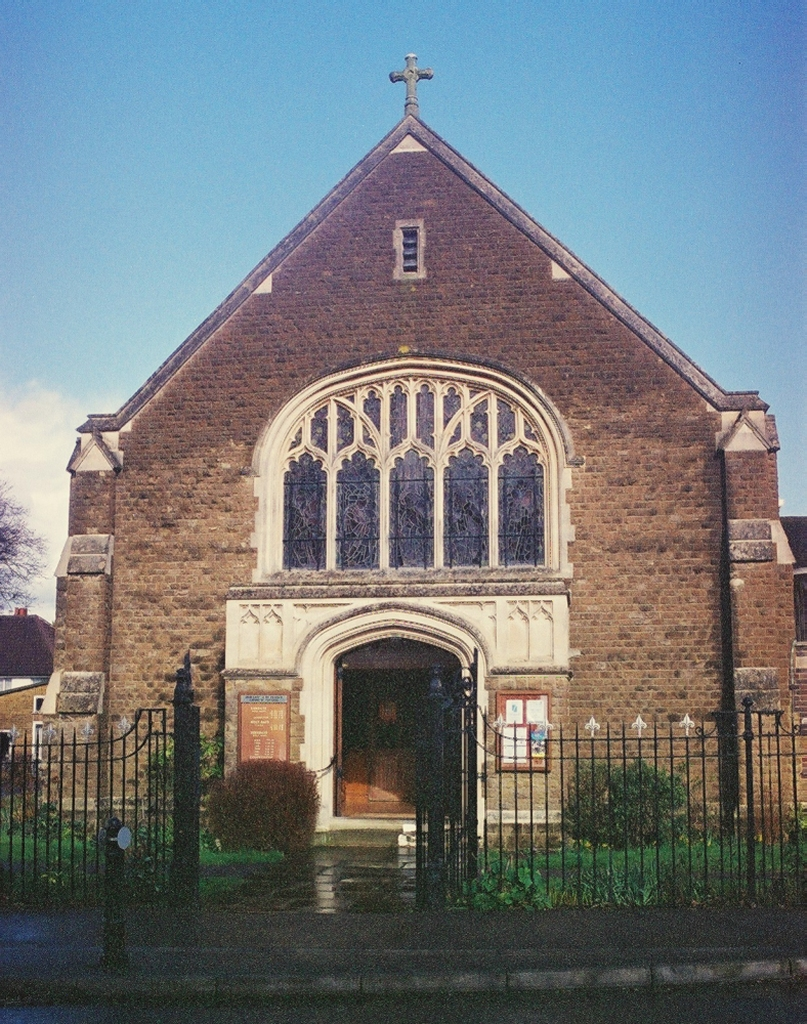
Front Entrance

=== St Peter Mission ===
Catholic worship didn't start in Leatherhead in the 20th century until the arrival of a Fr Lippens in 1915, who acted as a chaplain to the nearby military hospital. He was followed by a Fr Bernard Kelly who set up a mission to the Catholics in the area and named it the St Peter Mission. In November 1915, he rented two rooms in a nearby house and converted one of them into a chapel, officially opening a place of worship in the area.

After the war, Fr Kelly was replaced by Fr Francis Redaway. Upon arriving, he sought to build a new church for increasing number of Catholics in the area. He created a fund which people could donate to for the construction of the church. It was then that a local businessman and newspaper proprietor Sir Edward Hulton became interested in the project and helped finance the building of the new church.

=== Construction ===
In July 1922, land was bought and the foundation stone was laid later that month. During the building work a disagreement arose between Sir Edward and Bishop Peter Amigo. Sir Edward wanted the church to be dedicated to St Mary (in memory of his deceased sister) and the bishop wanted the church to be named after the original mission to the area, St Peter. In the end, they agreed to have a joint dedication to both St Mary and St Peter.

The architect was Joseph Goldie (1882–1953) who was the son of Edward Goldie (1856–1921), an architect, and grandson of George Goldie (1828–1887) a notable church architect in the 19th century who designed St Wilfrid's Church in York and the Church of St Mary and St Augustine in Stamford, Lincolnshire.

=== Interior ===
After the church was opened on 24 June 1923, the stained glass windows and the stations of the cross were added. The stained windows in the church are works by the artist Paul Woodroffe. The Stations of the Cross are by Eric Gill which are similar to the ones he did for Westminster Cathedral in 1914. The baptismal font was done by John Skelton, Gill's nephew, in 1928.

=== After World War II ===
From 1946 priests from the parish were going to Ashtead and Fetcham to serve the local Catholic congregations there. Shortly afterwards, those two places became parishes in their own right.

== Parish ==
The parish has a close relationship with St Andrew's Catholic School and St Peter's Primary School. This is shown by the mission statement of St Peter's School stating that they want all children at the school to be within an inclusive and safe Catholic environment.

The church has three Sunday Masses, at 8:30 am, 10:00 am and 6:00 pm, with Vespers and Benediction at 4:00 pm also on Sunday.

== See also ==
- List of places of worship in Mole Valley
