= Harry Southwell (cricketer) =

English cricketer and pastoralist

Personal information
- Full name: Henry Glanville Southwell
- Born: 20 May 1830; Saxmundham, Suffolk, England
- Died: 2 July 1890 (aged 60); Nettleton, Lincolnshire, England
- Relatives: John Richardson (son-in-law)

Domestic team information
- Years: Team
- 1852–1853: Cambridge University

Career statistics
Competition	First-class
Matches	6
Runs scored	84
Batting average	7.00
100s/50s	0/0
Top score	22
Catches/stumpings	2/–
- Source: Cricinfo, 3 May 2021

Henry Glanville Southwell (20 May 1830 – 2 July 1890) was an English first-class cricketer and clergyman.

The son of Henry Southwell, he was born in May 1830 at Saxmundham in Suffolk. He was educated at Harrow School, where he played for the cricket eleven, before going up to Trinity College, Cambridge. While studying at Cambridge, he played first-class cricket for Cambridge University Cricket Club in 1852 and 1853, making six appearances. He scored 84 runs in his six matches, with a highest score of 22. His appearances in the University Matches of 1852 and 1853 gained him a cricket blue.

After graduating from Cambridge, he took holy orders in the Anglican Church in 1856, when he was ordained a deacon at Lincoln Cathedral. His first ecclesiastical post in Lincolnshire was as curate at Usselby in 1856, a post he held until 1865. He was then curate at Croxby and Beelsby in 1865 to 1875, before becoming the reverend of Rothwell until his death in July 1890 at Nettleton, Lincolnshire. His son-in-law was the cricketer, jockey and politician John Maunsell Richardson.
