= St Leonard's Church, Newark =

St. Leonard's Church, Newark
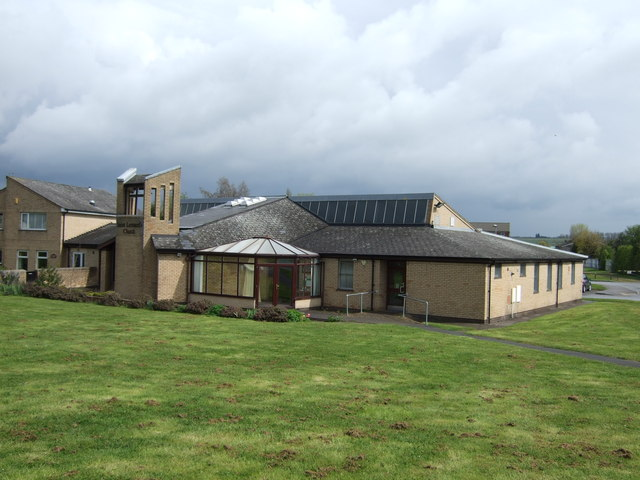
- St. Leonard's Church, Newark
- 53.0875°N 0.7951°W
- Denomination: Church of England
- Churchmanship: Broad Church
- Website: www.stmnewark.org

History
- Dedication: St. Leonard

Administration
- Province: York
- Diocese: Southwell and Nottingham
- Parish: Newark-on-Trent

St. Leonard's Church, Newark is a parish church in the Church of England in Newark-on-Trent, Nottinghamshire.

== History ==
The first church was built in Northgate in 1873 and designed by the architects Evans and Jolly of Nottingham. It cost £4,000 and was consecrated by Christopher Wordsworth, Bishop of Lincoln on 28 January 1873. The reredos was by A.H. Skipworth, and was in the form of a triptych with alabaster figures, depicting the crucifixion and the annunciation.

The organist in 1899–1903 was William Thompson Wright, who was afterwards organist of Church of St. Mary Magdalene, Newark-on-Trent.

A new church was built to replace the old in 1978, in Lincoln Road. It was designed by the architect Gordon Smith and dedicated by the Bishop of Southwell on 5 November 1978. The fittings of the old church were sold, and the reredos was acquired by Our Lady and St Benedict's Catholic Church, Wootton Wawen.
