= St John the Evangelist Church, Brentford =

Coordinates: 51.4896°N 0.3117°W

St John the Evangelist Church
- St John's Church
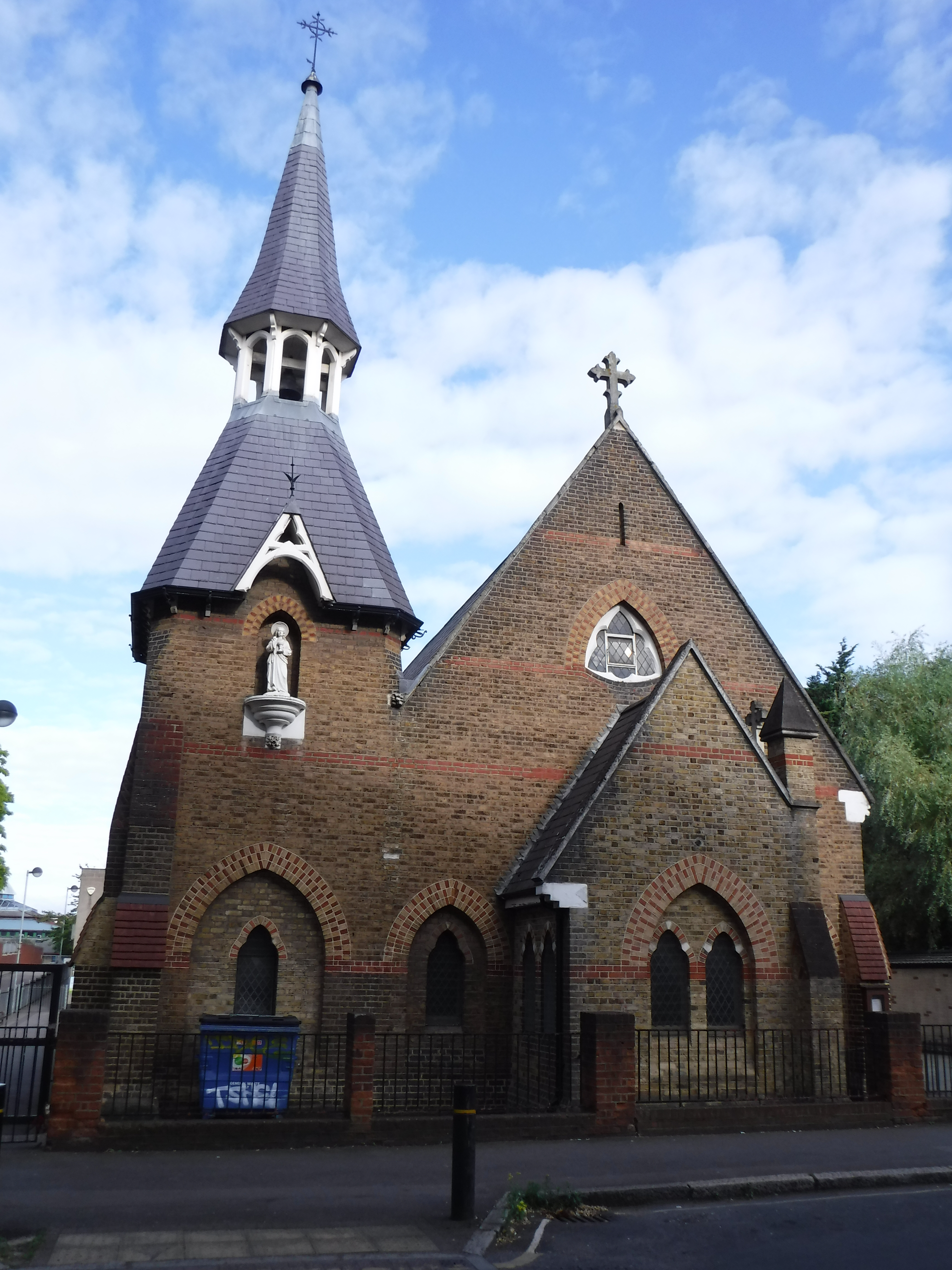
- St John the Evangelist Church
- Location: Brentford
- Country: England
- Denomination: Catholic
- Website: Official website

History
- Status: Parish church
- Dedication: John the Evangelist

Architecture
- Functional status: Active
- Heritage designation: Grade II listed
- Designated: 14 March 2016
- Architect: Mr Jackson
- Style: Gothic Revival
- Years built: 1866

Administration
- Province: Westminster
- Archdiocese: Westminster
- Deanery: Hounslow
- Parish: Brentford

St John the Evangelist Church is a Catholic parish church in Brentford, Borough of Hounslow, London. It was built in 1866 by Mr Jackman, but has parts of it designed by John Francis Bentley, Nathaniel Westlake and Paul Woodroffe. It is a Gothic Revival church and a Grade II listed building. It is located on Boston Park Road, opposite the Great West Road and the M4 motorway in Brentford.

== History ==
=== Foundation ===
After the English Reformation, during the time of recusancy, until the Roman Catholic Relief Act 1829, there were instances by the government authorities of Catholics living in Brentford: one family from 1606 to 1623 and two from 1623 to 1636. Archibald Campbell, 7th Earl of Argyll resided in Brentford in 1638. Two more people were recorded as Catholics in Brentford in 1767. In 1856, a mission was started in Brentford to serve the Irish population who worked on the railways there. From 1857 until the construction of the current church, the mission used the former Baptist Chapel at Market Place as a place of worship.

=== Construction ===
In 1866, the church was built. The architect is recorded by the church as being a Mr Jackman, but there is no record of his full name, nor details about his life. When the church was opened, it was largely undecorated. Over the following decades, additions would be made to the church. In 1883, John Francis Bentley was recruited by the priest, J. W. Redman, to design a new altar, reredos and narthex in the church. Of his work, only the narthex survives. From 1883 to 1884, stained glass windows were installed in the north of the church, designed by Nathaniel Westlake. Around 1903, the east window, with a trefoil was added. It was designed by Paul Woodroffe.

== Parish ==
From 1972 to 1973, the parish centre was built. It is behind the presbytery. The church has three Sunday Masses at 6:30 pm on Saturday and at 9:30 am and 11:30 am on Sunday.

== Interior ==
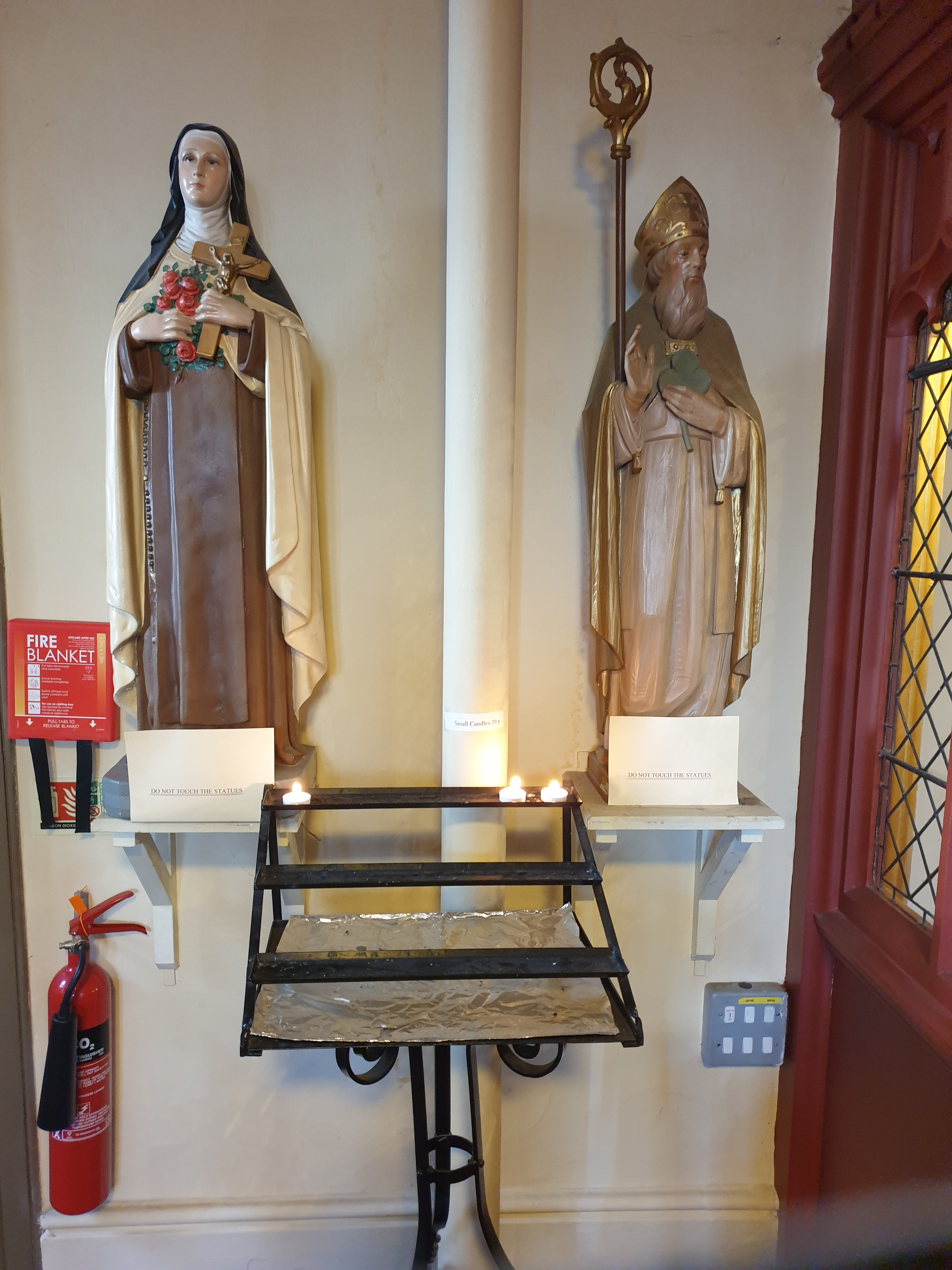
Statues

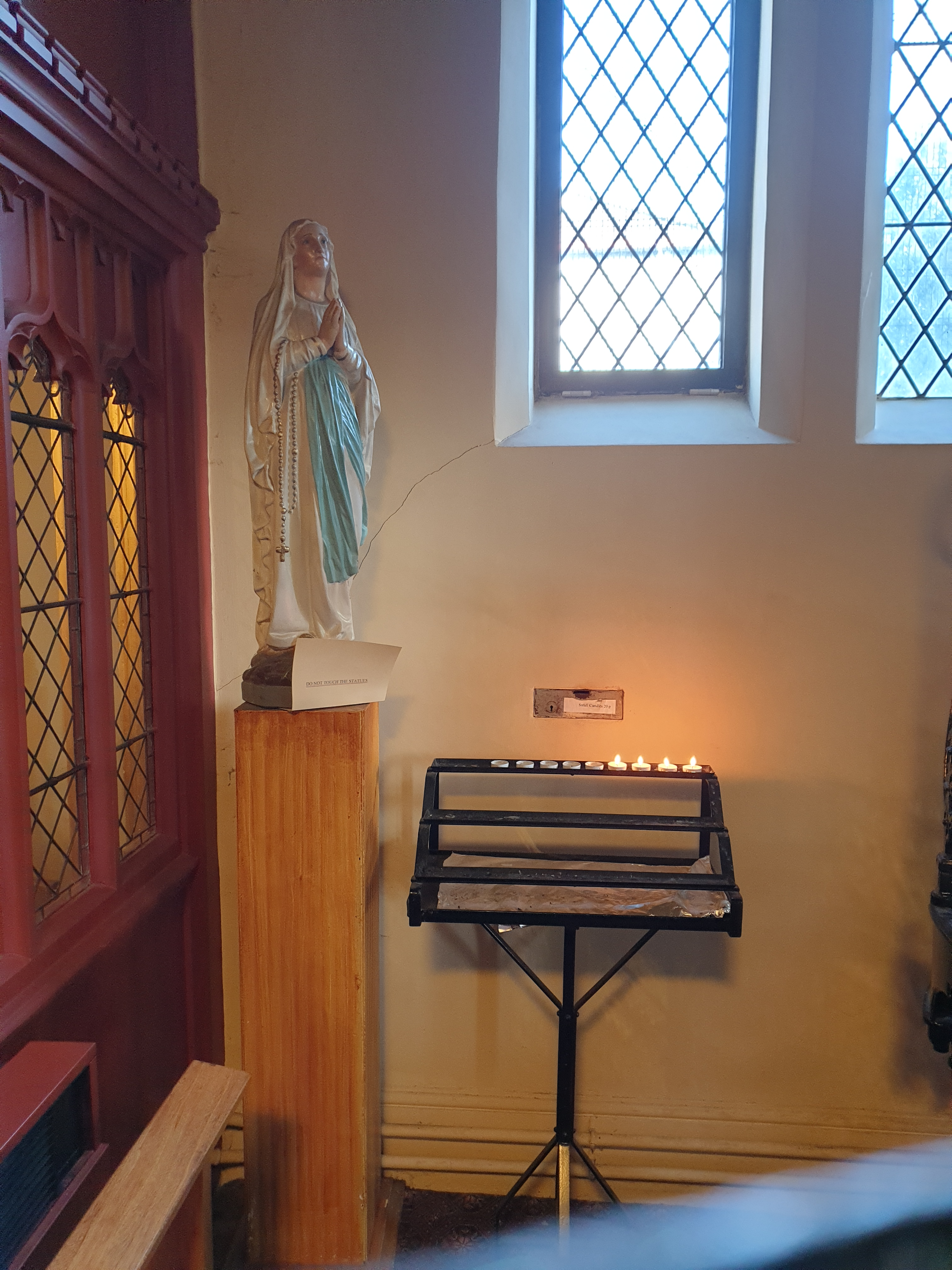
Statue of St Mary

== See also ==
- Diocese of Westminster
