= Our Lady of Perpetual Help Catholic Church, London =

Roman Catholic church in Fulham, southwest London

Our Lady of Perpetual Help
- Our Lady of Perpetual Help Catholic Church, Fulham
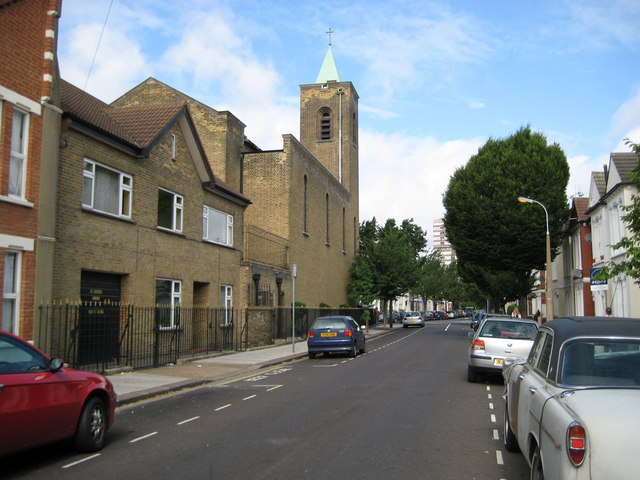
- View down Tynemouth Street
- Our Lady of Perpetual Help
- 51.4726°N 0.1866°W
- Location: Fulham, London
- Country: England
- Denomination: Roman Catholic
- Website: LadyofPerpetualHelp.org

Architecture
- Architect: Benedict Williamson
- Groundbreaking: 1922

Our Lady of Perpetual Help Church is a Roman Catholic church in Fulham, in the London Borough of Hammersmith and Fulham. The church was designed by Benedict Williamson, an architect who later became a Catholic priest. It is situated on Stephendale Road and the parish house is situated on Tynemouth Street.

== Interior ==
Its soaring classical columns and Romanesque arches emphasizes the light and space of the church giving it a height and grandeur that make it look deceptively large. The church was built just after the discovery Tutankhamen’s tomb in Egypt, so there are interior details that reflect the fascination with Egyptian pictures from the time. The Stations of the Cross each have a meditation in their own right.

== History ==
In 1914, a local lady lost her son in action in the First World War. In 1922, she bought the local rubbish tip and built the church of Our Lady there in the memory of her son. She presented a silver cup to the first baby baptized here and a suite of furniture to the first couple married. It has been a parish church ever since.
