= Church of St Mary the Virgin, Edith Weston =

Church in Edith Weston, Rutland, England

Coordinates: 52°38′17″N 0°37′52″W

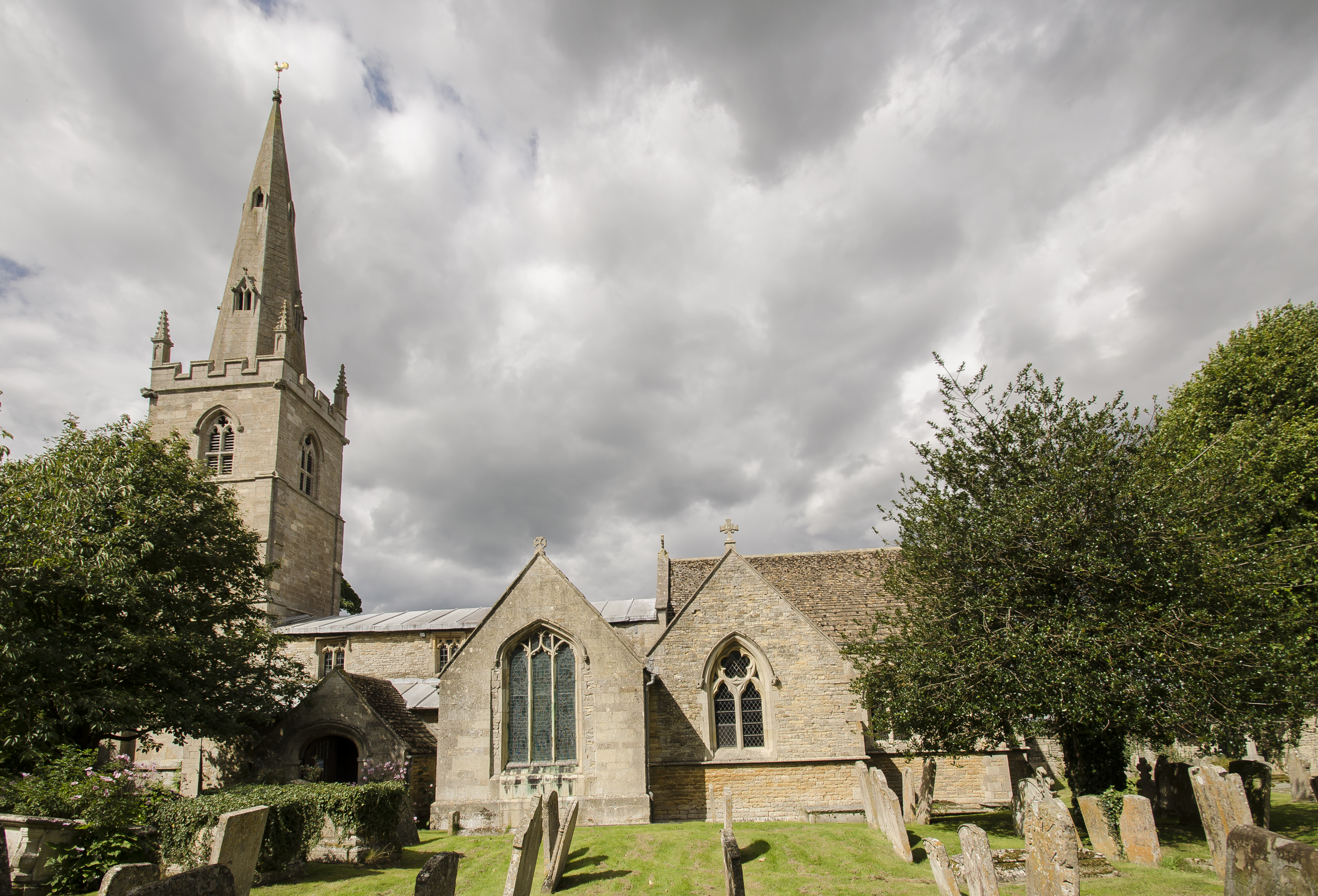
- Denomination: Church of England

History
- Dedication: St Mary the Virgin

Administration
- Diocese: Peterborough
- Parish: Edith Weston, Rutland

The Church of St Mary the Virgin is a church in Edith Weston, Rutland. It is a Grade I listed building.

== History ==
The church was built in c.1170 but the tower was built two centuries later. The northern aisle in the chancel is used as a vestry and organ chamber.

The church was re-seated and repaired in 1848. In 1865, the chancel and the southern chapel were built in the 14th-century French style, by Slater & Carpenter. The reredos by A.H. Skipworth and George Frampton is a memorial to the Reverend Charles Halford Lucas who was responsible for the Victorian restoration. The church's northern wall and the nave's northern aisle were also rebuilt. In the vestry there are two preserved corbels dating from the 13th century and two piscina bowls.

It includes stained glass by Paul Woodroffe and Hugh Arnold. The organ is by Samuel Green of London and dated 1787.
