= Edith Weston =

Village in Rutland, England

Coordinates: 52.64°N 0.63°W

- Village and Civil Parish
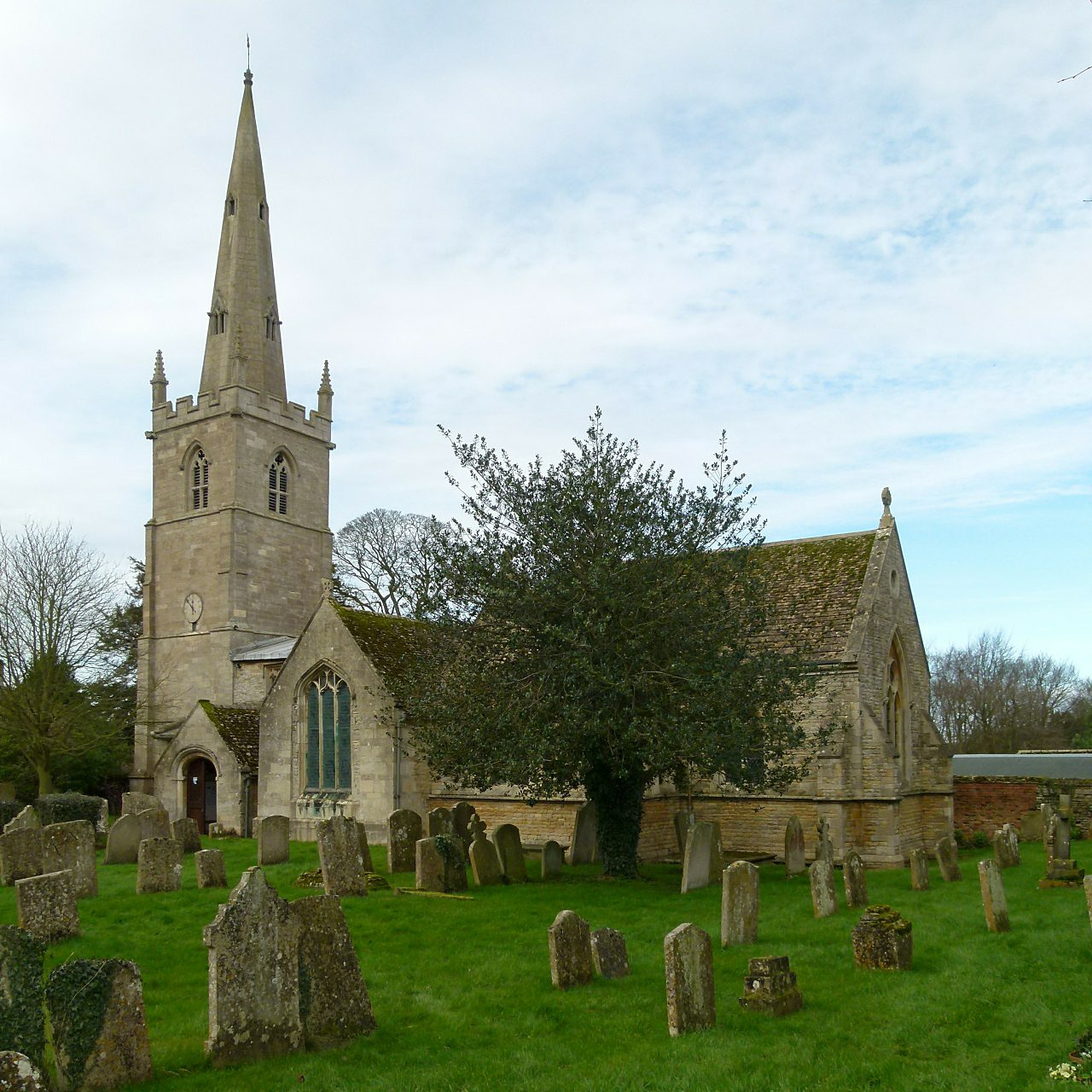
- Church of St Mary the Virgin.

- Location within Rutland
- Area: 2.89 sq mi (7.5 km^{2})
- Population: 1,042 2001 Census
  - Density: 361/sq mi (139/km^{2})
- OS grid reference: SK927053
  - London: 82 miles (132 km) SSE
- Unitary authority: Rutland
- Shire county: Rutland
- Ceremonial county: Rutland
- Region: East Midlands
- Country: England
- Sovereign state: United Kingdom
- Post town: OAKHAM
- Postcode district: LE15
- Dialling code: 01780
- Police: Leicestershire
- Fire: Leicestershire
- Ambulance: East Midlands
- UK Parliament: Rutland and Stamford

Edith Weston is a village and civil parish in the county of Rutland in the East Midlands of England. The population of the civil parish was 1,042 at the 2001 census, including Normanton and increasing to 1,359 at the 2011 census. It is on the south-eastern shore of Rutland Water and is home of the main sailing club and a fishing lodge. The village is named after Edith of Wessex (c. 1025–1075), the queen of Edward the Confessor and sister of Harold Godwinson.

The Grade I listed church is dedicated to St Mary the Virgin and includes stained glass by Paul Woodroffe and Hugh Arnold; the organ is by Samuel Green of London and dated 1787.

The village pub is the Wheatsheaf on King Edward's Way.

St George's Barracks is located to the south and east of the village; this was previously RAF North Luffenham. In August 2007 16th Regiment Royal Artillery, equipped with the Rapier FSC, moved here from Woolwich.

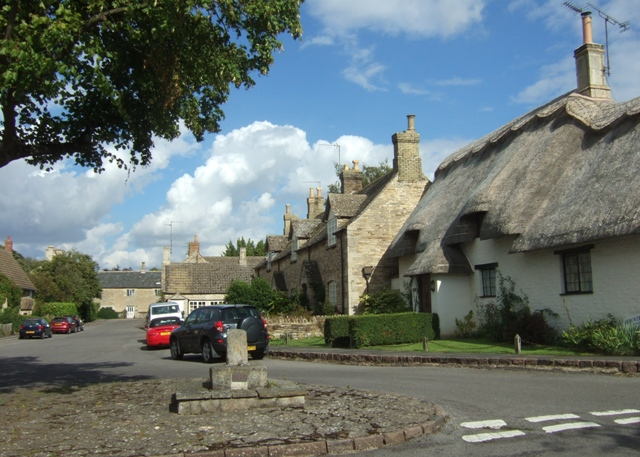
Well Cross, Edith Weston

Edith Weston features in the Alan Sillitoe 1984 novel Down From the Hill, with the main character stopping off in the Wheatsheaf for a shandy.

The village primary school, Edith Weston Academy, is situated on Weston Road, on the western edge of the village. It was built in the mid 1960s to replace a temporary school housed in former RAF North Luffenham Nissen huts on the current site of the Rutland Water Normanton Car Park to the east of the village.

== Edith Weston Hall ==
Edith Weston Hall was a former country house built in an Elizabethan style by the architect Lewis Vulliamy for the Rev. Richard Lucas in 1830, replacing the Old Hall which stood near the church. He died in 1846 and was succeeded by his son Richard Lucas, High Sheriff of Rutland for 1847, who passed it on to his brother George Vere Lucas, who took the surname of Braithwaite under the terms of a will. His son Major Ernest Lucas Braithwaite (also High Sheriff in 1902) sold the estate in 1904 to his nephew, Stafford Vere Hotchkin. In 1913 the latter sold the estate lands by auction and then in 1922 sold the Hall and Park to F. T. Walker of Norton Lees, Derbyshire, although the hall had been destroyed by fire in 1920. He sold them in 1924 to T. J. Burrowes, who sold them to Lieut.-Col. Francis Henry Hardy, who restored the hall in 1924 as the residence of the Hardy family. It was demolished in 1954.

== See also ==
- Edith Weston Priory
