= Croxby =

Hamlet and former civil parish in the West Lindsey district of Lincolnshire, England

Coordinates: 53.467375°N 0.2092°W

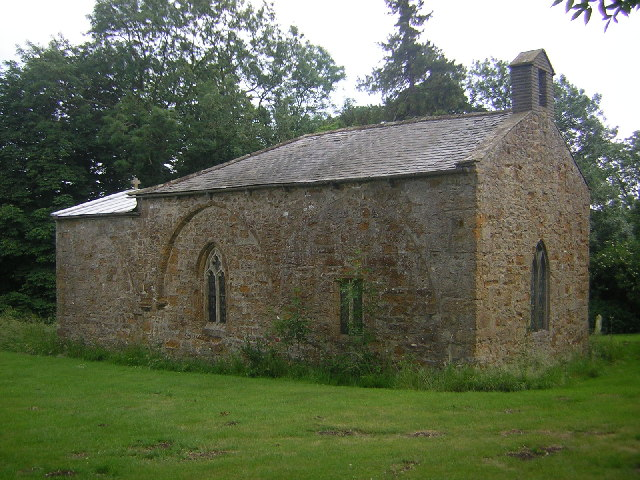
- Church of All Saints, Croxby

- Location within Lincolnshire
- OS grid reference: TF189982
  - London: 135 mi (217 km) S
- Civil parish: Thoresway
- District: West Lindsey
- Shire county: Lincolnshire
- Region: East Midlands
- Country: England
- Sovereign state: United Kingdom
- Post town: Market Rasen
- Postcode district: LN7
- Police: Lincolnshire
- Fire: Lincolnshire
- Ambulance: East Midlands
- UK Parliament: Gainsborough

Croxby is a hamlet and former civil parish, now in the parish of Thoresway, in the West Lindsey district of Lincolnshire, England. It is situated approximately 5 miles (8.0 km) east from the town of Caistor. In 1931 the parish had a population of 77. On 1 April 1936 the parish was abolished and merged with Thoresway.

Croxby deserted medieval village (DMV) lies to the north-east from the church, with Croxby Hall at the bottom, and along the sides of, a narrow stream running through a chalk valley. At the time of the Domesday survey Croxby had a population of 36.

Croxby church is dedicated to All Saints and is a Grade II* listed building of ironstone dating from the 12th century, with later additions and restorations. The font is also 12th-century.

Croxby Hall is a Grade II* listed building of red brick dating from 1730.
