= St Ignatius Church, Stamford Hill =

Coordinates: 51.580057°N 0.074844°W

St Ignatius Church
- Roman Catholic Church of St. Ignatius, Stamford Hill
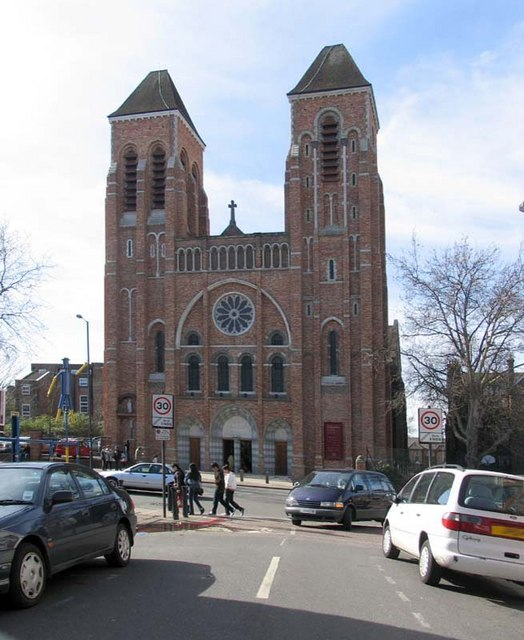
- Front of St. Ignatius Church

- Location of church within Haringey
- OS grid reference: TQ 33595 88197
- Location: Stamford Hill, London
- Country: England
- Denomination: Roman Catholic
- Website: www.stignatius.co.uk

History
- Status: Active
- Founded: 1894
- Dedication: St. Ignatius of Loyola

Architecture
- Functional status: Parish Church
- Heritage designation: Grade II
- Designated: 10 May 1974
- Architect: Fr. Benedict Williamson
- Style: Romanesque Revival
- Groundbreaking: 1894
- Completed: 1911

Administration
- Province: Westminster
- Archdiocese: Westminster
- Deanery: Haringey

St Ignatius Church, Stamford Hill, is a large, listed Roman Catholic parish church in the Archdiocese of Westminster ministered by the Society of Jesus (Jesuits) who founded it in 1894. It is on the corner of Stamford Hill and St. Ann's Road, at the junction with Tottenham High Road, in the London Borough of Haringey, close to the border with the London Borough of Hackney, north London.

== History ==
=== Founding ===
In 1892, Cardinal Herbert Vaughan invited the Jesuits to create a parish church, and also a primary school and a secondary school for boys. He did this after receiving a petition from nearly 300 people for a parish to be set up in the Stamford Hill area.

The first Mass was celebrated in Morecambe Lodge, a large house, since demolished, on the site of the unproductive land (historically termed waste) next to the church. In the following year Burleigh House next door was bought. This was used to house Jesuits, including priests, until a new presbytery opened in 1928.

=== Construction ===
A chapel was constructed from the stables, coach house and stable yard of Morecambe Lodge, but soon the congregation increased to such a size that a proper church was needed. The Jesuits decided to dedicate the church to their order's founder, St. Ignatius of Loyola. For financial reasons the church was built in two stages. The first part, which included the sanctuary, was opened in 1903 and the exterior parts were completed in 1911.

The architect, Benedict Williamson, converted to Catholicism and became a priest after being responsible for the design of several other churches in the south-east of England. The interior decoration of the church is notable for the significant mosaic glass illustrations in vivid colours of the birth of Christ and of the Sacred Heart, as well as the Stations of the Cross. These were in the opus sectile style much favoured by the Arts and Crafts movement at the time of construction.

The interior of the church was not completed until 1925. The chapel of St Joseph at the back of the church is dedicated to the men of the parish who died in the First World War and their names are inscribed on the front of the altar. The High Altar and the communion rails are still present in the church.

=== School ===
The secondary school asked for by Cardinal Vaughan was founded on 10 September 1894 next door to the church, and was called St Ignatius' College. By the 1960s it needed greater capacity to be able to teach an increasing number of pupils and it moved to Enfield in 1968. It left behind a primary school, also dedicated to St Ignatius. Jesuits ceased in the 20th century to run the expanding primary school adjoining which is entrusted to the borough and financially to the Archdiocese of Westminster, while as a Roman Catholic school retaining a close relationship with the church.

== Parish ==
The church is active pastorally. Many voluntary organisations run in the parish and its main premises. For example:

- Major outreach to homeless including daily distribution of hot food to between 40 and 60 daily.
- Meeting venue of many groups including Legion of Mary; Knights of St. John; AA; Al Anon.
- Support for the Tottenham Refugee Alliance.
- The St Ignatius Housing Association is supported. This houses some of the homeless and while non-discriminatory serves the neediest, many of whom turn to the church.
- Meeting venue of Ignatian spirituality groups such as the Christian Life Community.

== Choirs ==
Being home to a multi-cultural congregation, the parish has seven church choirs, representing the diversity of the parishioners. The acoustics of the church aid choir singing, and the church houses a 3 manual Compton organ. The choirs are:

- St Ignatius Parish Choir
- Junior Choir, started in 1997, for ages 7 to 10.
- Youth Choir, for ages 11 to 16.
- The St Ignatius Caribbean Choir, started in 1985.
- African Society Choir
- Latin American Choir
- Polish Choir

== Gallery ==
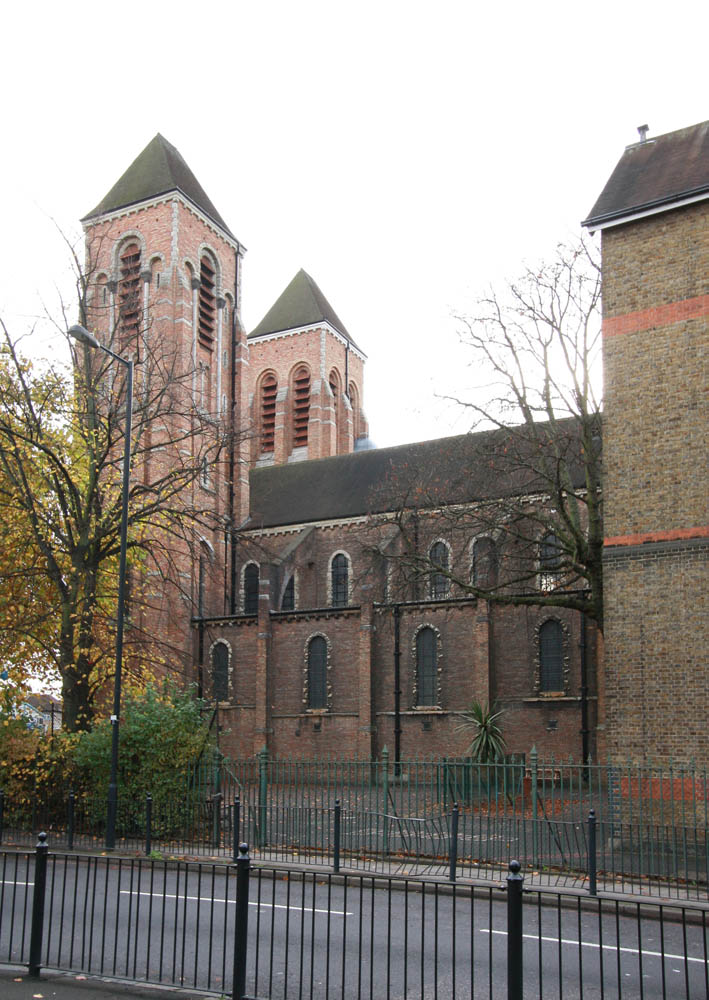
North side

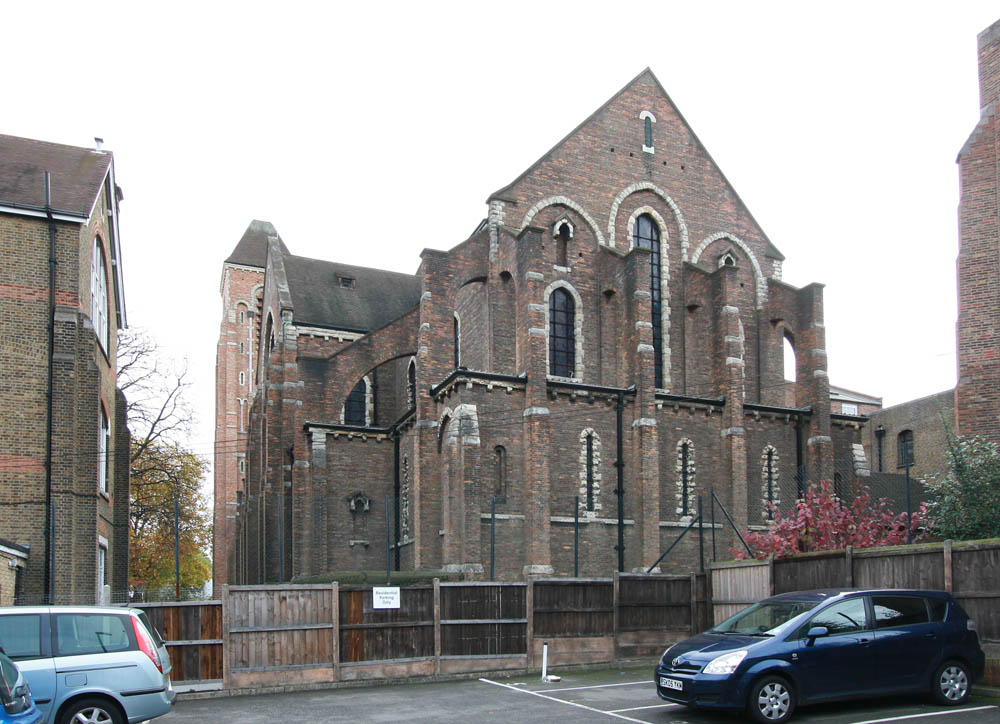
West side

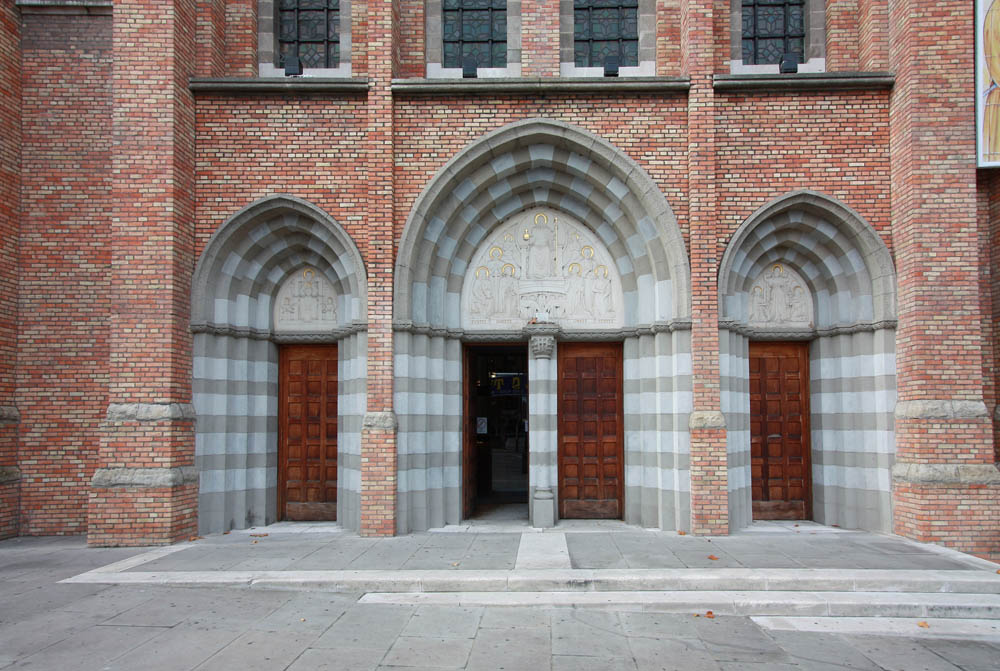
Entrance

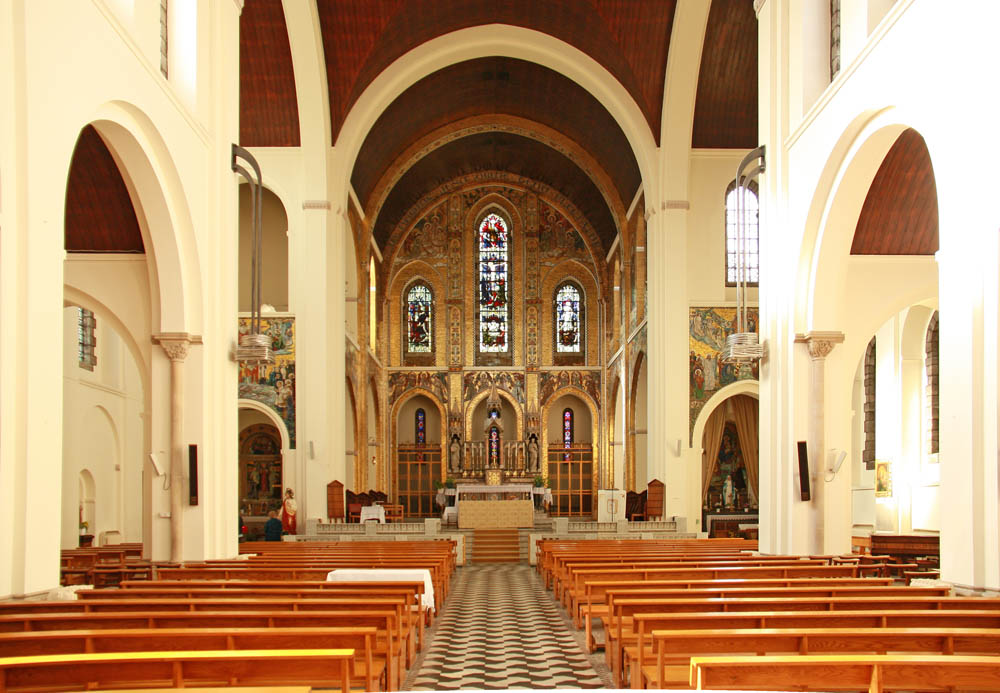
Interior

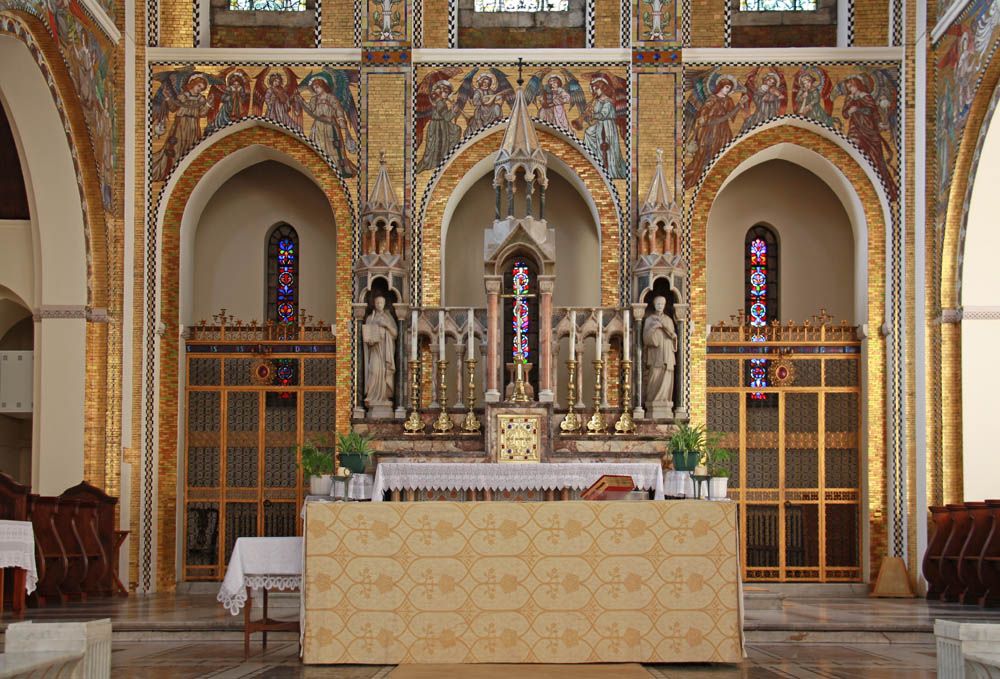
Altar

== See also ==
- St Ignatius' College
- Ignatian spirituality
- List of Jesuit sites in the United Kingdom
- List of Catholic churches in the United Kingdom
