= Rachel de Montmorency =

English painter

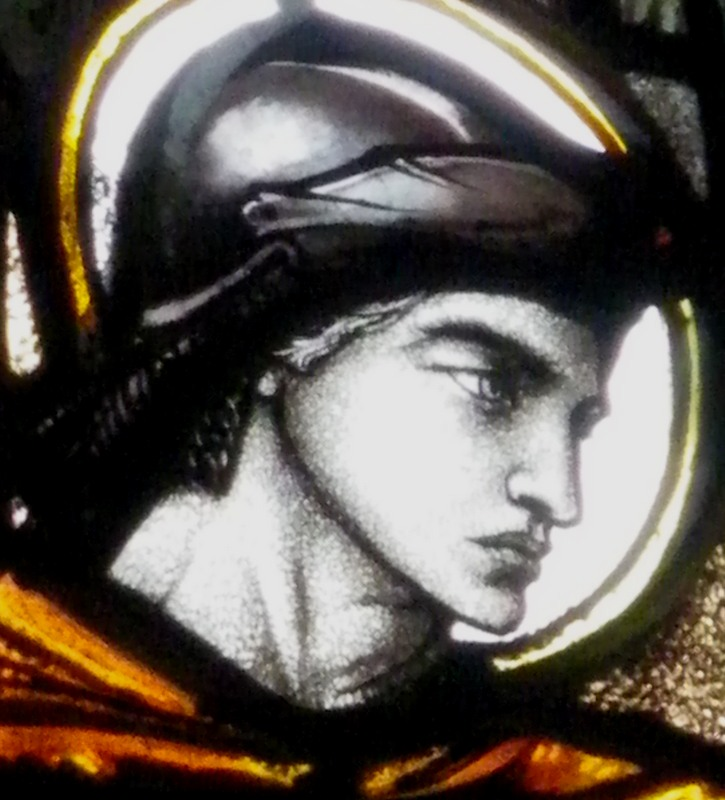
- Window in St Botolph's Church, Cambridge
- Born: 15 July 1891
- Died: 15 November 1961 (aged 70)
- Education: Trained under and assisted Christopher Whall and Edward Woore
- Known for: Stained Glass. Painting
- Notable work: See listing below.

Rachel de Montmorency, born Rachel Marion Tancock (15 July 1891 – 15 November 1961), was an English painter and artist working in stained glass. She learned about stained glass when she worked for artist Christopher Whall in the 1910s and 1920s. During World War I, she worked as a voluntary nurse.

After she married Miles de Montmorency (1893–1963) in 1931, the couple often worked together on her commissions. She was a follower of the Arts and Crafts Movement.

== Biography ==
Rachel was born on 15 July 1891, at Rossall, Fleetwood, Lancashire. Her father, the Rev. Charles Coverdale Tancock D.D., was the headmaster of Rossall School. He became headmaster of Tonbridge School in Kent and hired stained glass artist Christopher Whall to create a set of windows for the school's chapel.

Rachel became one of Whall's pupils after completing her studies at Heathfield School, Ascot. She studied painting and stained glass-making whilst assisting in Whall's studio. She assisted Whall and Edward Woore with windows at Sorbie Church in Wigtownshire in 1910. It was here that she would have met Edward Woore, Karl Parsons, and Arnold Wathen Robinson.

Rachel was accepted in 1914 as a probationer at the Royal Academy Schools, but when war broke out, she decided to put her painting studies on hold and enrolled in the Voluntary Aid Detachment (V.A.D.) as a nurse, and worked in that capacity throughout the Great War. After the war, she became an assistant and then manager of Edward Woore's studio at St. Peter's Square in Hammersmith. In 1925, Woore moved to a studio in Putney and Rachel continued to work with him and also produced her own work, including the St. Botolph's war memorial window and the T. H. Mason memorial window in the Rottingdean School Hall.

In 1931, she married artist Miles de Montmorency, who would often assist her with her stained glass work. In the late 1920s, she worked on windows designed by Professor R.M.Y. Gleadowe for the College Hall of Winchester College. (Note: "The Wykehamist" magazine of 14 November 1930 stated "A good deal of the pattern-work was painted by Miss Rachel Tancock (then resident in Winchester)". Information courtesy of Miss Suzanne Foster, Archivist at Winchester College.) and carried out two windows to Gleadowe's design for Cheltenham College. Temporarily, the Montmorency's were to live in Winchester. Miles was to inherit a baronetcy in 1959.

In 1939, she completed one of her finest windows, a three-light memorial window to her father in the Tonbridge School Chapel, which complemented windows in the chapel by Whall, Parsons and Lilian Josephine Pocock. Unfortunately, all the Tonbridge windows were destroyed in a fire which ravaged the chapel in 1988.

Although she became crippled by arthritis in her later years, she was able to work until a few days before her death on 15 November 1961.

== Works ==
The following is a list of some of Rachel de Montmorency's work. Photographs are provided in the gallery below this list.

=== St. Botolph's Church ===
One of Montmorency's earliest commissions was for a two-light war memorial window in the South Chapel of St. Botolph's Church in Cambridge, Cambridgeshire, depicting St. George and St. Michael. A close-up of part of the window is shown at the beginning of this article and further images are shown below. Montmorency's window is located in a side chapel, which is locked for most of the time, but is still visible through a glass screen. The church has an elaborate chancel by the Victorian architect George Frederick Bodley. There is a memorial to Darwin, whose family were parishioners of St. Botolph's, by the vestry door.

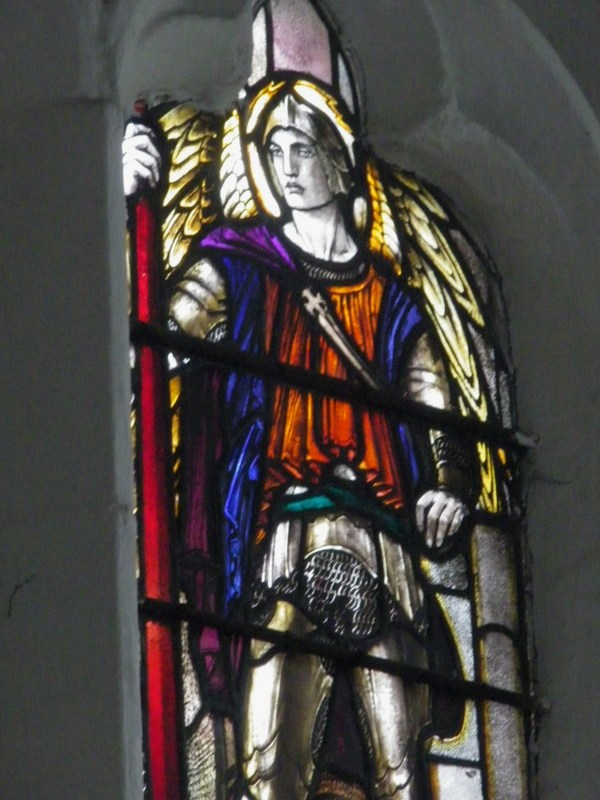
St. Botolph. Cambridge

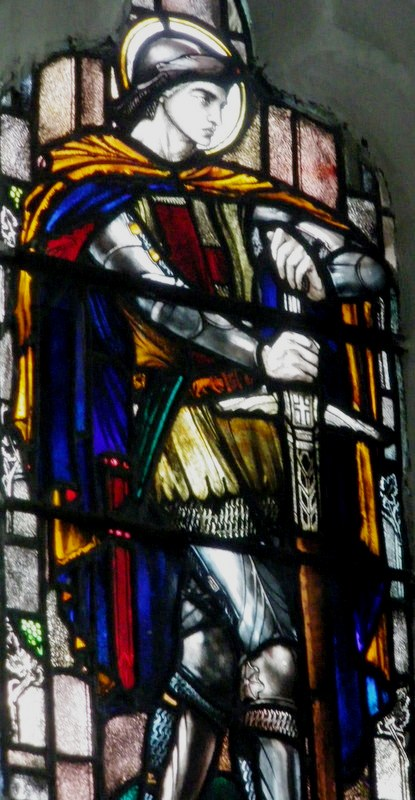
St. Botolph. Cambridge

=== St. Saviour’s Church ===
Montmorency completed an East window above the High Altar in St. Saviour's Church in Guernsey, Channel Islands. It was funded by public subscription and dedicated in 1956. The drawings of the window were among the exhibits of an exhibition of stained glass at the Building Centre in London in 1956. (Note: It is recorded that she was encouraged by the influence of Milner White, the Dean of York.) The window is of three-lights and depicts Christ in Majesty with scenes from the Annunciation, Nativity, Crucifixion and the Road to Emmaus.

=== St. Mary's Church ===
In 1946, Rachel de Montmorency was commissioned to design a single light window for the North Chancel of the 12th century St. Mary's church of Great Shefford, Berkshire, which depicts the Blessed Virgin Mary and Baby Jesus.

=== Holy Trinity ===
The Anglican Parish Church of The Holy Trinity in Street, Somerset, dating from the 14th century, has been designated by English Heritage as a Grade I listed building. In 1949, Rachel completed a three-light East window for the church which depicts Christ with St. Gildas and St. Dunstan and the Virgin and Child with Samuel and John the Baptist.

=== Christ Church ===
Working with her husband Miles, Rachel executed four windows for Christ Church, a Gothic church built of load-bearing yellow London stock bricks and Bath stone.

The work was completed in 1953 and 1954 in this Mitcham, Outer London church. The East window is of five-lights and depicts "Christ in Majesty". The West window south is a single-light window and depicts Moses and a second single-light West window North depicts Elijah. In the North Chancel there is a two-light window depicting the Annunciation. The Montmorencys also completed a rose window positioned above the West window.

=== St. Mary Magdalene ===
St. Mary Magdalene in Wandsworth, Inner London has two three-light windows completed in 1954 for the North Aisle West by Rachel de Montmorency, who was assisted by her husband. One window depicts a lamb, St. John the Baptist and a Pelican and the other, Mary Magdalene, the Madonna and Child and Simeon.

=== St. John the Evangelist ===
Rachel de Montmorency's three-light East window for St. John the Evangelist Church, Grays North Grays in Little Thurrock, Essex serves as a Second World War memorial. The window, created in 1947, depicts the Apostles and Our Risen Lord and it is recorded that the faces of these Apostles were deliberately made youthful by way of a tribute to the youth of many of those who died. The window includes the crests of the Navy, Army, Air Force and Merchant Navy and over and below the depiction of Jesus are the words "I am the vine and ye are the branches". See photographs in gallery belo

=== St. John's Church ===
St. John's Church, a Grade II listed building, is situated in Walham Green, Fulham, London. The church, built in 1828, is a mixture of styles with a Georgian Chancel and pointed Gothic revival arches and windows. Rachel executed a single light window for the South Aisle in 1946, which depicts St. George and another in the North Aisle area which depicts St. John. The original East window, a copy of Raphael's Transfiguration, blew out in a gale in the 1880s and was later replaced. Miles de Montmorency assisted Rachel with these windows.

=== All Saints ===
The foundation stone for the All Saints Church in Eastbourne, Sussex was laid in 1877. The church was rebuilt in 1929 after a disastrous fire. In 1961, a two-light Rachel de Montmorency designed window was added to the North Aisle area depicting St. Martha and St. Mary Magdalene. The window is in memory of Elsie Randall.

=== St. Michael and All Angels Church ===
The present church of St. Michael and All Angels of Jarvis Brook, Sussex was built in 1905 on a site given by Lord Abergavenny and designed by John Beaumont Tansley. Nugent Francis Cachemaille-Day remodelled the interior in 1935. There is a 1936 east window modeled by Christopher Webb, and in 1950, Rachel de Montmorency was responsible for the first window in the South Nave. This window was installed in memory of Captain Charles Bunburby R.N, who was a sidesman and a member of the Parochial Church Council for many years. The window depicts St. Nicholas, patron of sailors, who holds a ship; below, there is a lighthouse. The inscription reads "He bringeth them unto the haven where they would be".

=== St. Michael's Church ===
Rachel completed a two-light window in 1960 depicting a Madonna & Child and a ship. This window is the second window in the South Nave area of the St. Michael's Church in Little Horsted, Sussex. The church was restored by Sir George G. Scott in 1862-63, and has a font carved by Farmer and Brindley. The church also has glass by Clayton and Bell and E. F. Brickdale.

=== St. Michael and All Angels Church ===
Situated in Ocklynge, Eastbourne, Sussex, St. Michael and All Angels Church was opened in 1901, and the Nave and Tower were finished in 1911. The church has an East window by James Powell and Sons, and Rachel completed a two-light North window in 1950.

=== Cheltenham College Chapel ===
Rachel completed several windows in the chapel's narthex. These windows depict the coats of arms of the 10 schools belonging to the Public Schools Masonic Chapter: Cheltenham, Marlborough, Westminster, Charterhouse, Clifton, Wellington, Sherborne, Bradfield, Winchester and Rugby.

== Gallery ==
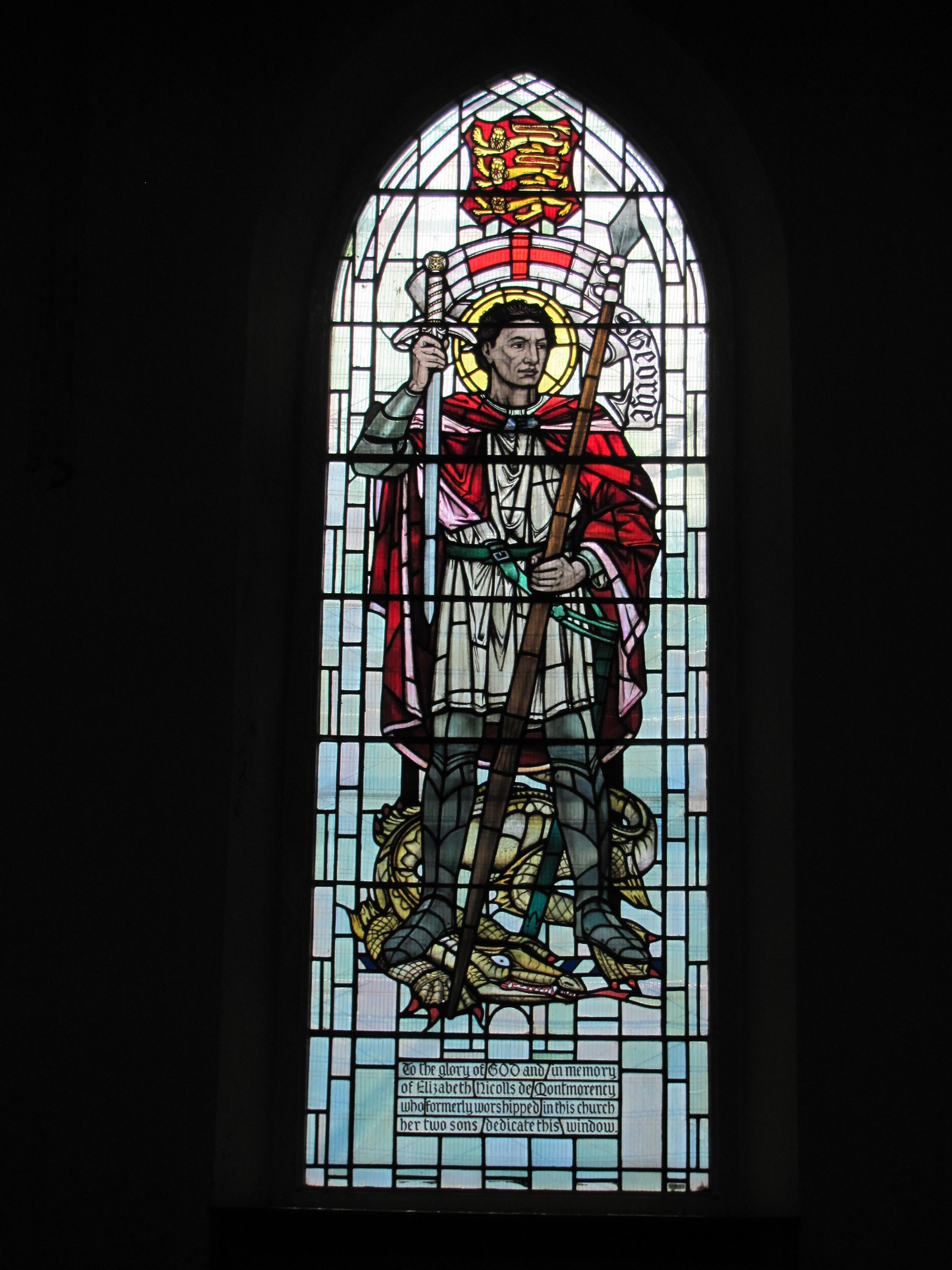
Window depicting St. George. Photograph courtesy Stephen Overton. St. John's Church. Walham Green

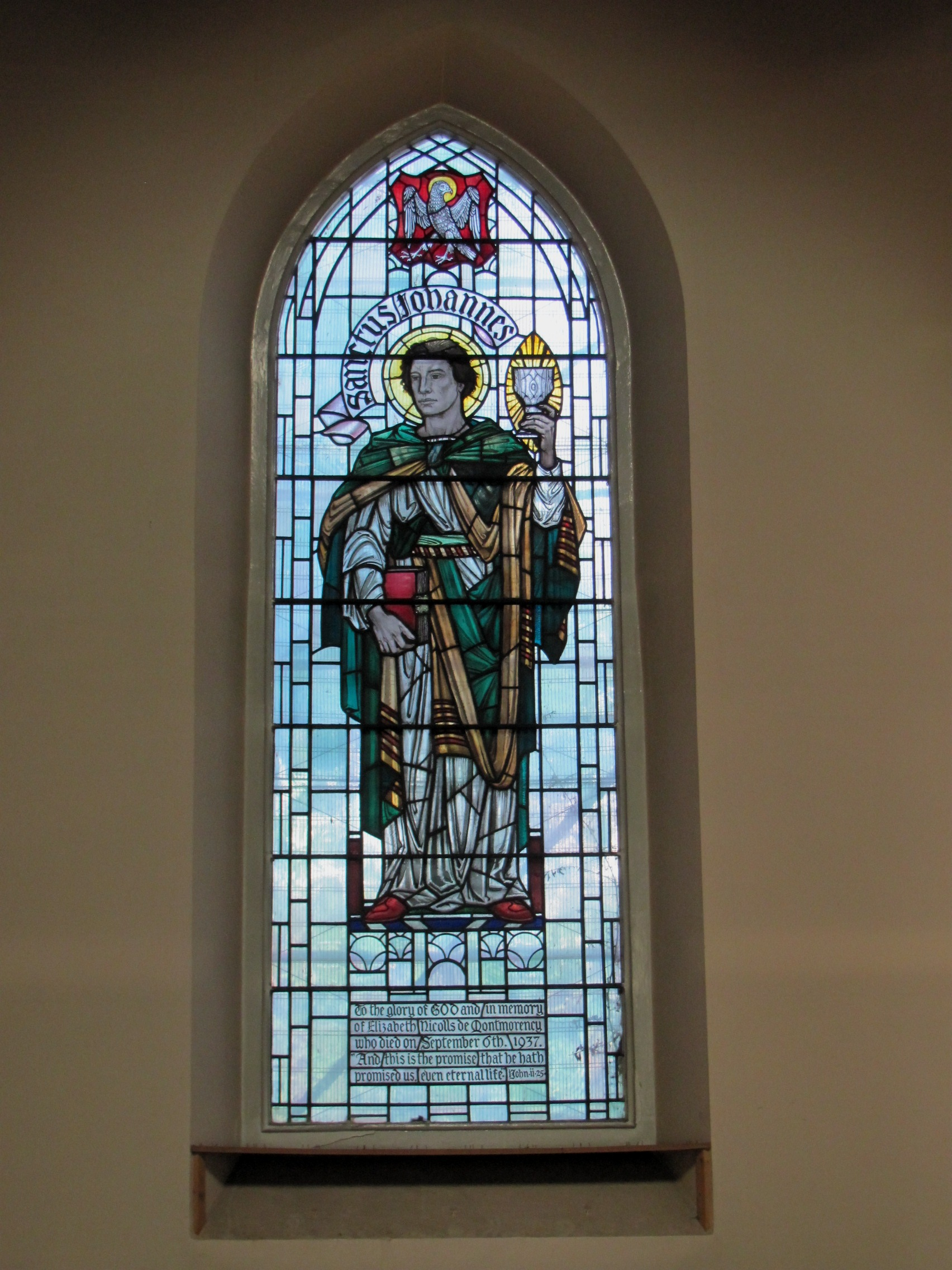
Window depicting St. John. Photograph courtesy Stephen Overton. St. John's Church. Walham Green

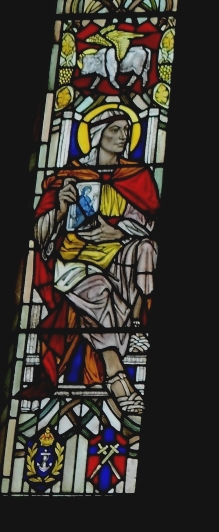
Thurrock window. One of the four Apostles with crests below of Navy and Army. Photograph courtesy Roger Going.

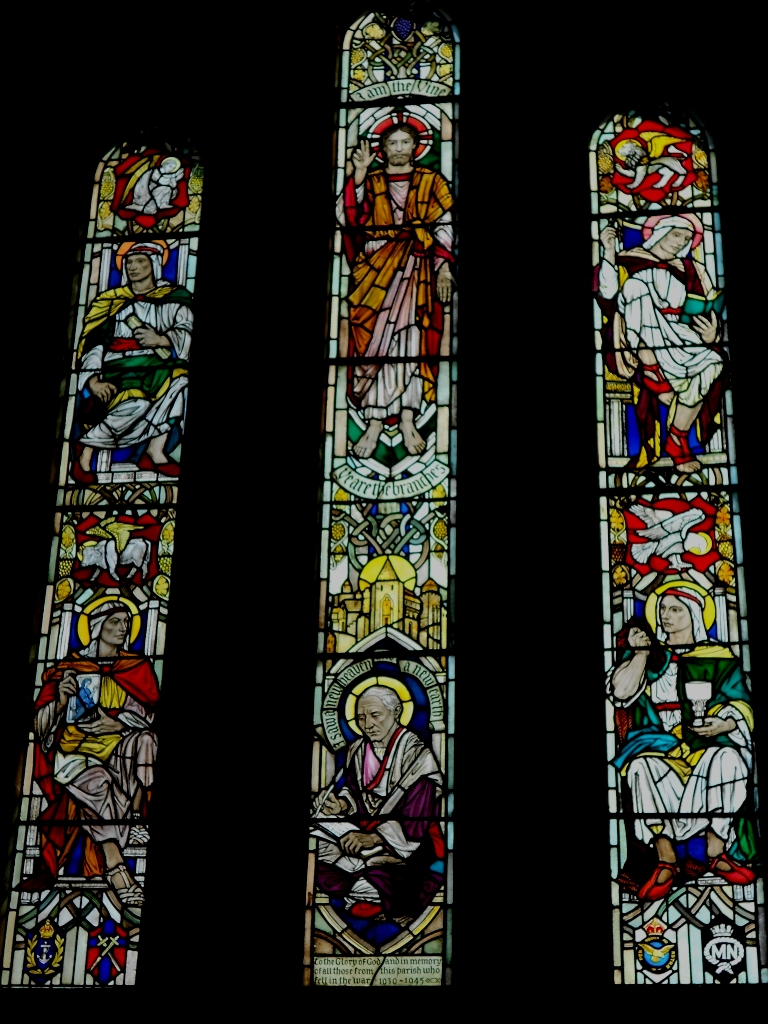
Three-light Grays North Grays/Thurrock church window. Photograph courtesy Roger Going.

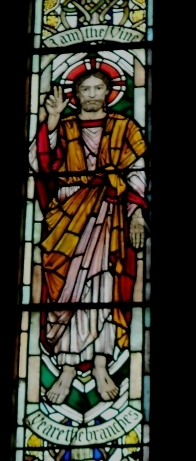
Our Risen Lord. Grays North Grays/Thurrock window. Photograph courtesy Roger Going.

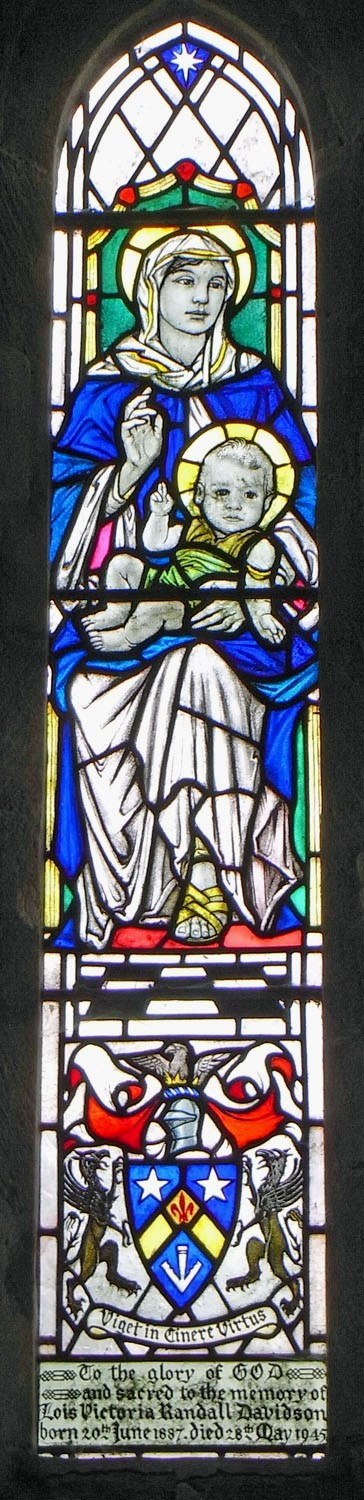
St. Mary's Great Shefford—Montmorency window. Courtesy Liz Saunders.

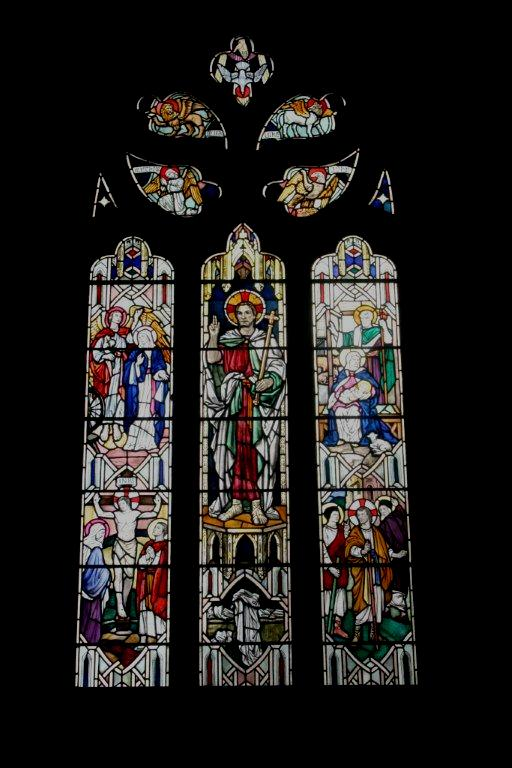
Window in St. Saviour's Church in Guernsey. Courtesy Mark and Tracy Charmley.

== Notes ==
St. Mary's Church, Great Shefford
