= List of works by Edward Woore =

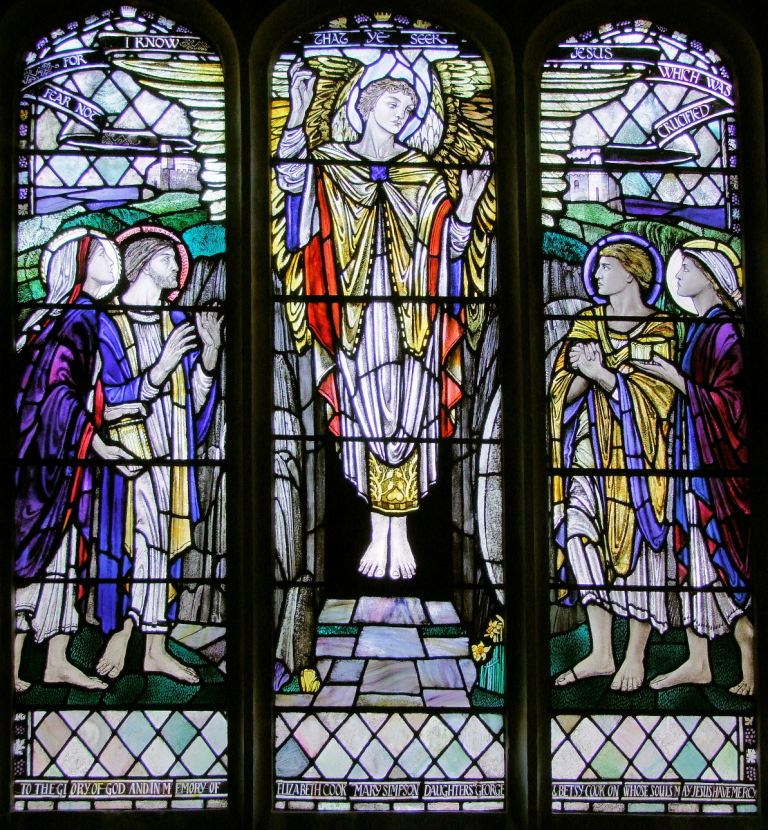
Edward Woore window in St Lawrence's Church. Bardney. Lincolnshire.

This is a listing of Edward Woore's major works, listed where possible in date order.

== Background ==
Edward Woore (1880–1960) was a stained glass artist and part of a group of artists trained by Christopher Whall, a leading figure in the Arts and Crafts Movement. Fellow apprentices included Louis Davis and Karl Parsons. Together with Parsons he helped illustrate Whall's book " Stained Glass Work" in 1905.

He was a close friend and fellow apprentice of Arnold Robinson, who took over the stained glass company of Joseph Bell and Sons in Bristol and for which Woore often undertook commissions. He later managed Whall's studio for a short time before Whall's death and also collaborated with Whall's daughter Veronica. For a time he had had his own studio in Hammersmith and from 1924 to 1941 did so again in Putney, where he lived at 66 Deodar Road, the same road as so many of Whall's followers.

== Works in cathedrals and parish churches ==
Church	Location	Date(s)	Subject, notes and references
St John	South Collingham, Nottinghamshire	1913	Subject of Woore's window in the church's South Aisle is the 104th Psalm.
St Mary	Ashby Folville, Leicestershire	1917	Woore's North Chancel window was commissioned by Elizabeth Prince Smith-Carington in memory of her husband Herbert Hanbury Smith-Carington who died in 1917. The subject is the Good Samaritan. In Woore's composition, Jesus, the Good Shepherd, holds a lamb whilst two ewes look on. These are a local breed, "Border Leicesters", whose wool was the mainstay of Leicester's hosiery and knitwear industries, now no longer in existence. Jesus has his feet on a bed of anemonies which grow wild in the Levant and are understood to be the traditional flower of Jordan. Also shown are the heads of two small donkeys which at the time the window was designed were much used and much loved by the Ashby Folville people.
All Saints	Warlingham, Surrey	1918	A two-light window in the South Aisle West area of All Saints is in memory of L and R. Roberts. The theme is "Suffer little Children".
St Bride's Episcopal Church	Glasgow. Lanarkshire	1919 and 1920	G. F. Bodley designed this church and work began on the Chancel in 1903, though a lack of funds was to delay completion. The church was finally consecrated on 1 February 1915. Woore's first window in this church is called "Endurance through Sacrifice" and was installed in 1919 as a gift from Mrs Percy Watson, a thanksgiving for the safe return from the Great War of her three sons, Percy, John and Robert. The 1920 window entitled "The Marriage at Cana" is a memorial to Grace Mary Walter (1890–1918). The subject is Jesus turning water into wine (John 2:1). J. Ballantine added glass to the tracery of "The Marriage at Cana" in 1929.
St Katherine	Irchester.	1924	The four-light window at the Eastern end of the South Aisle was a work by Woore whilst at Whall and Whall.
St Lawrence	Bardney, Lincolnshire	About 1925	Woore designed a window for the South Chancel. Image shown above appears courtesy Tina Negus.
Christ Church, Seaside	Eastbourne, Sussex	1927 to 1935	Woore completed a four-light window in the South Chapel area.
St Mary's Church	Winkfield, Berkshire	1929	Woore's window in the North Aisle West area is of two lights and has depictions of the Saints Osmund and Bede in the South side and Alban and Edward in the North side.
Church of St James and St Basil	Newcastle upon Tyne, Northumberland	1930	The church is actually near Fenham Hall. It was commissioned by the millionaire ship-owner Sir James Knott (1855–34) in memory of two of his sons killed during the Great War (Major James Leadbitter Knott and Capt. Henry Basil Knott). Sir James' first wife Margaret Annie Knott also died during the course of building, so that the church also became her memorial. The nominal architect was Eric Edward Lofting (d. 1950), the then Deputy Surveyor to the Fabric, Westminster Abbey, on the recommendation of W. R. Lethaby (1857–1931), who had just resigned as the Surveyor to the Abbey. However, virtually all the detailing of the church was done by Lethaby's colleague, George Washington Jack (1855–1931), Philip Webb's former assistant, and like Lethaby, a stalwart of the Art Worker's Guild. This work included the stonework detailing of all the windows, parapets and coursing of the ashlar walls, the clock-case on the corner angle of the tower, doorframes, woodwork (with carving by Lawrence Turner), as well as a large proportion of the stained glass. The letter-cutter and calligrapher Graily Hewitt, and the silversmith, John Paul Cooper, were also engaged on the project. Building commenced in 1928, and the church was dedicated in 1931, although Lofting was retained to design the accompanying vicarage, parish hall and memorial garden. This church is regarded as being amongst the great churches of the Arts and Crafts Movement. Of the thirteen windows in this church, Woore executed the majority, and designed that in the North Aisle East, depicting the "Life and Passion of Christ" and the North Aisle West, Dame Margaret Knott's memorial known as the "Children's window". He also designed the East window of the memorial chapel under the tower, "What I Tell in Darkness, That Speak Ye in Light", and the two windows high on the North side of the Choir. The latter form part of a scheme based on Psalm 104, and largely designed by Jack, who also designed the memorial window on the south side of the chapel, dedicated to Knott's sons. Jack also designed the "Adam and Eve" window at the West end of the South Aisle – the latter may have been made under Jack's direct supervision at Messrs. Lowndes & Drury, as it is otherwise so unlike Woore's glass in execution.
Egremont Presbyterian (Manor Church Centre)	Wallasey, Cheshire	1922	Woore did some of his best work for this church. The church is now closed and it is understood that the building has been sold. This church also contained stained glass by Wilhelmina Geddes, Edward Burne-Jones, William Alkman, Percy Bacon, John Houghton Bonner, Henry Gustav Hiller and Gilbert P Gamon. The Woore window is signed "The Artificers' Guild".
St Mary	Rushden, Hertfordshire	1934	St Mary's two-light West window is by Woore and has a pattern of flowers on clear glass.
St Peter's Church	West Blatchington, Sussex	1935	Woore completed a two-light window for the old church
St Andrew's Church	Paddock Wood, Kent	1936	The East window in St Andrew's is a three-light window which depicts "The Good Shepherd". The inscription reads "I am the good shepherd I know my sheep and am known as mine". The central light portrays the Good Shepherd, the left hand light shows St Andrew and that on the left St Peter. Whilst Woore designed the main window, Carl Edwards designed the tracery glass in 1962 which shows symbols of the Passion.
St Michael's Church	Steeple Claydon, Buckinghamshire	1938	Woore's window for this church depicts the Sower and the Harvester. The window is in memory of Charles Bass, a previous vicar of the church. The inscription reads "I am come that they might have life and that they might have it more abundantly." John 10:10. The window is of two lights and located in the South Aisle South East.
St Mary's Church	Prescot, Merseyside	1938	Woore complete a window for this church in 1921. It is called the "St George" window and is in memory of Lt Arthur Frederick Evans of the 100th Squadron of the RAF, who was killed in action on 30 October 1918 at Langres in France. Woore was also responsible for the "Leyland" window which is inscribed "In memory of John & Elizabeth Leyland and their son John, Churchwarden 1923–1934 and superintendent of Prescot Parish Church Sunday School 1918–1934". Another Woore window in this church includes a depiction of Jesus stood in a boat on the sea of Galilee in the upper section and in the lower section, 'The Sower', a man is shown sowing seeds and oxen pulling a plough, this window also dating to 1938. In the top 3 panels of the "Leyland" window we see Jesus in the temple with his disciples and young children with their mothers. They had brought their infants to him so he might touch them. The disciples rebuked the mothers for doing so, but Jesus was much displeased and said to them "Suffer little children to come unto me and forbid them not, for such is the Kingdom of God ". Mark 10 v. 13-14. The bottom part of the window shows St Andrew, St Christopher and St Elizabeth of Hungary.
St Saviour's Church	Brookwood, Surrey	1927	Woore's circular East window, with three divisions, depicts Christ the Shepherd flanked by a Nativity scene and an angel with chalice.
St Peter's and St Paul's Church	Bromley, Greater London	1954	This church was badly damaged by German bombs in 1941 but had been rebuilt by 1957. Woore designed windows for the North wall of the Children's Chapel these showing scenes from the childhood of Jesus. The Western and Central windows are memorials to the Beer family and are inscribed "in loving memory of Norah Gregory Beer and her three children, Douglas, Rosemary & Graham." These portray the "Flight into Egypt" and "The Adoration of the Magi".
Salisbury Cathedral	Salisbury, Wiltshire	1919	Woore's window in the North Choir area is in memory of William Pare Roberts, Dean of Salisbury 1907–19 and his wife Margaret Grace Pare Roberts. The window is of two lights and depicts scenes from Ruth in one light and scenes from David in another.
Christ the King	Putney, Surrey	1951	This is now a Polish church and was previously St John's. Has a five-light "Christ in Majesty" East window.
Chelmsford Cathedral	Chelmsford, Essex	1953	Woore made the Coat of Arms in a stained glass window to commemorate the coronation of Elizabeth II. The window is in the South Porch.
St Mary's Church	Camberley, Surrey	1937	In the four panels of Woore's window in this church, which represents the Annunciation, the first shows an angel with harp, the second an angel, thought to be Gabriel, the third shows Mary and the fourth an angel with a stringed instrument similar to a violin/viola. This information courtesy Kay Rothwell at St Mary's. The window is the East window.
St Mary	Whalley, Lancashire	1937	For this Whalley church, Woore executed a two-light window with the figures of St Anthony and St Giles.
Christ Church with St Philip.	Eastbourne, Sussex	1936	There is a four-light window in the South Chapel by Woore.
St Philip	Eastbourne, Sussex	1936	St Philip church was absorbed into that at Christ Church and St Philip's Church itself was demolished. There were Woore windows in the Chapel of St Philip's.
The Church of St John the Baptist	Portsmouth, Hampshire		This Church built 1915–16 had a Woore window (the East window in the South wall). The church was converted into flats in 1986/87.
Westminster Abbey	Westminster, Inner London	1952	For the East Chantry area, Woore executed a four-light window which depicts Henry III, Edward III, Henry V and Henry VII..
All Saints	Loose, Kent	1952	The second window in the South Aisle is by Woore. It is of two lights and depicts a nurse and soldier in one light and the Madonna and child in the second.
St Nicholas	Baydon, Wiltshire	1928	West window is of three lights and in memory of the Rev. Augustus Gibson. The window depicts the Sower, Suffer little children and the Reaper.

== Other work ==
- There is a work by Woore in the Stained Glass Museum at Ely. It depicts Jesus with Joseph and Mary in Joseph's carpenter's shop. The window was designed by Edward Woore and made by Joseph Bell and Son. It is entitled: "Christ in the Carpenter's Shop"
- Two chancel windows in St Peter, Westleton, Suffolk are attributed to Woore. The two-light window on the south side represents St Felix & St George and is a memorial to three members of the local Deck family who were killed in WWII
- In the volume of "The Buildings of England" "Somerset" by Andrew Foyle, the author states that the Chigi Memorial window in St Margaret's Church, Queen Charlton, Somerset which was made by Bell and Son was probably designed by Woore.
- The Bembridge School chapel in Bembridge, Isle of Wight contains a window by Woore. Bembridge School closed in 1997 and the site is now occupied by Ryde School with Upper Chine but the chapel which is Grade IIGV listed has been retained.
- Woore also executed two windows for St Luke's Church in Havelock North, New Zealand in 1928. The first depicts the Annunciation: The Angel Gabriel tells the Virgin Mary that she is to bear the child Jesus. She carries lilies which symbolize virginity and purity. The second window depicts the Nativity: Mary is depicted with the baby Jesus in the Bethlehem stable. Below are some images of these windows shown courtesy Thea and Roeland Kloppenburg. Thea is the Parish Administrator and Roeland, who took the photographs, is her son
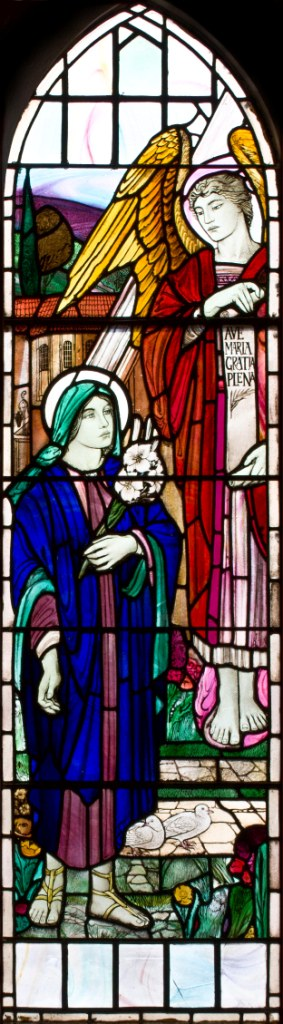
Window in St Luke's Havelock. The Annunciation.

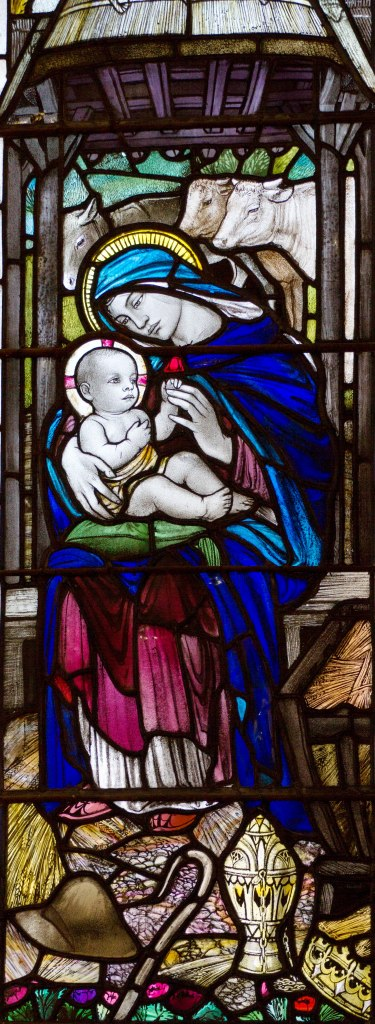
Window in St Luke's Havelock. The Nativity.

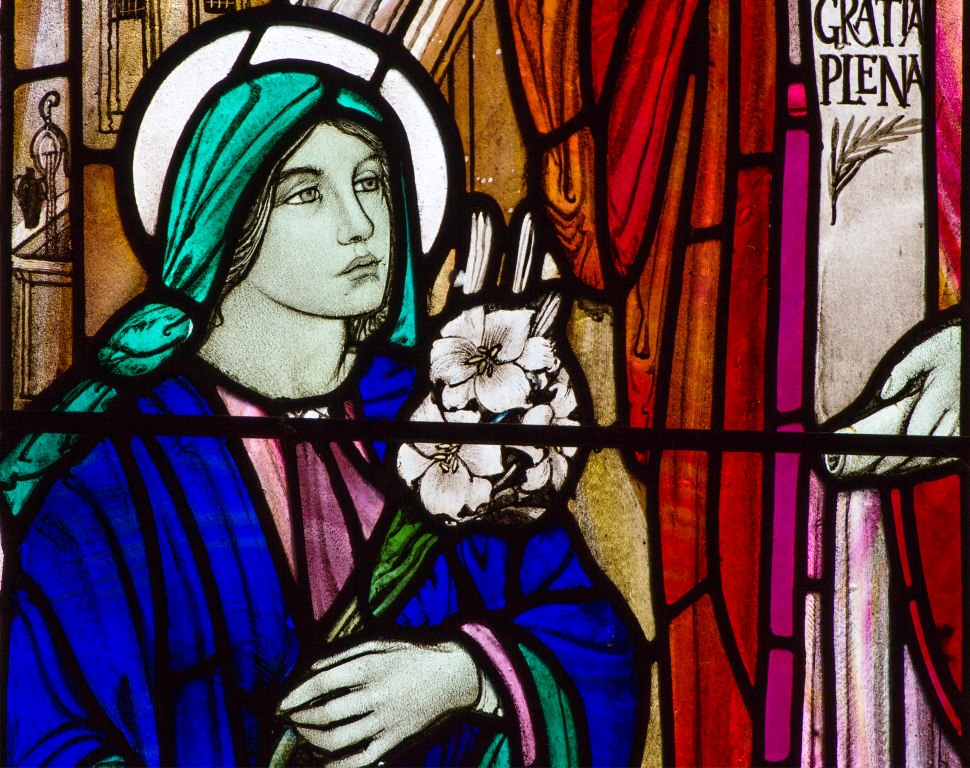
Part of The Annunciation.

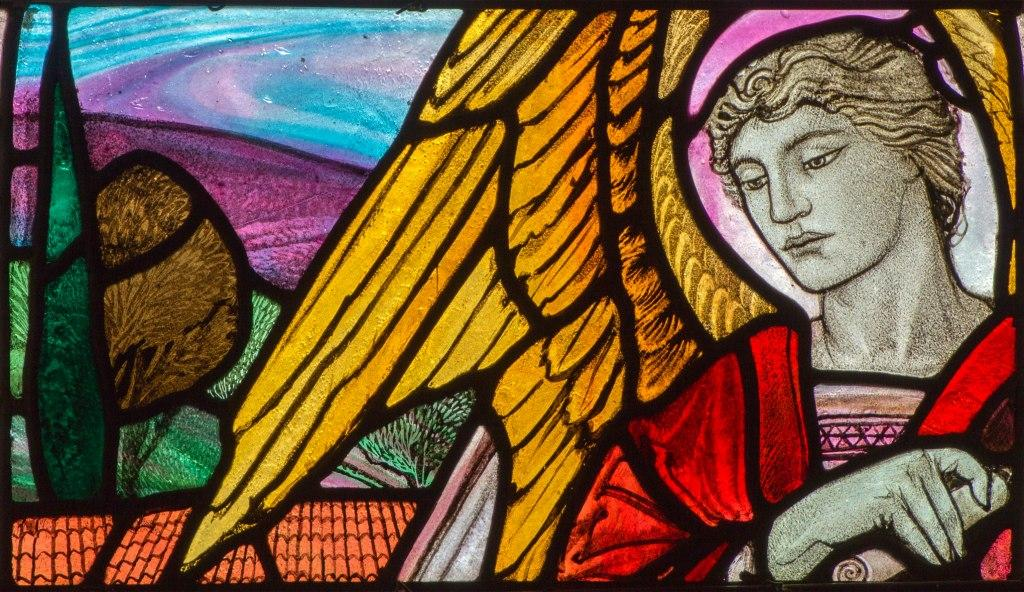
Part of The Annunciation.

== Gallery ==
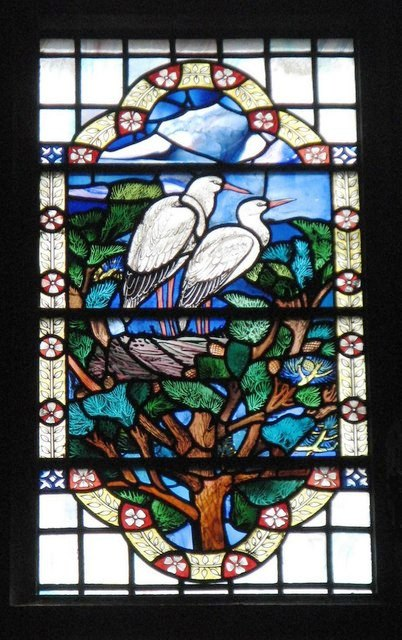
Detail from Edward Woore window in St James and St Basil Church

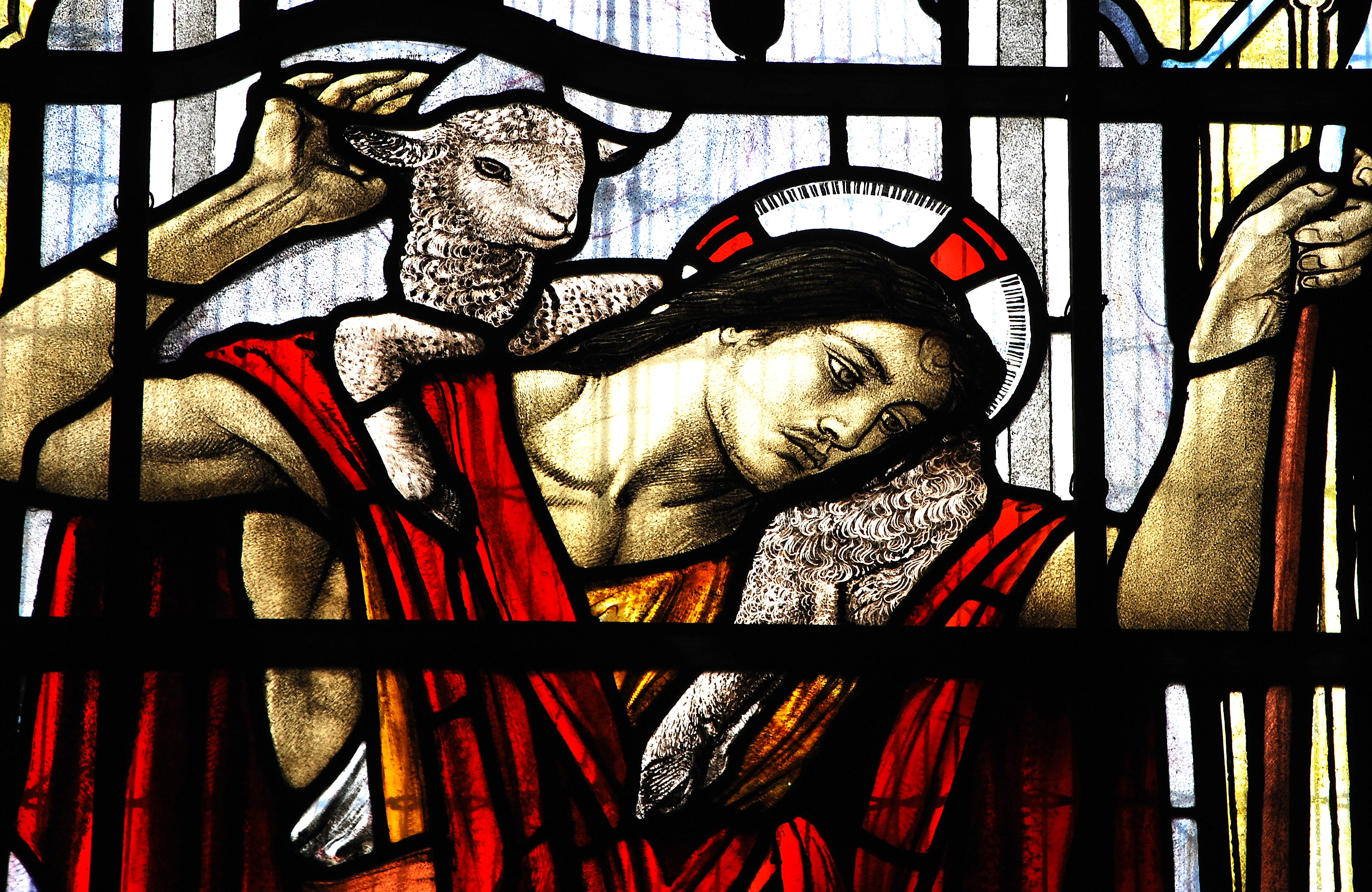
Detail from St Saviour Brookwood window. Courtesy Andrew Loutit

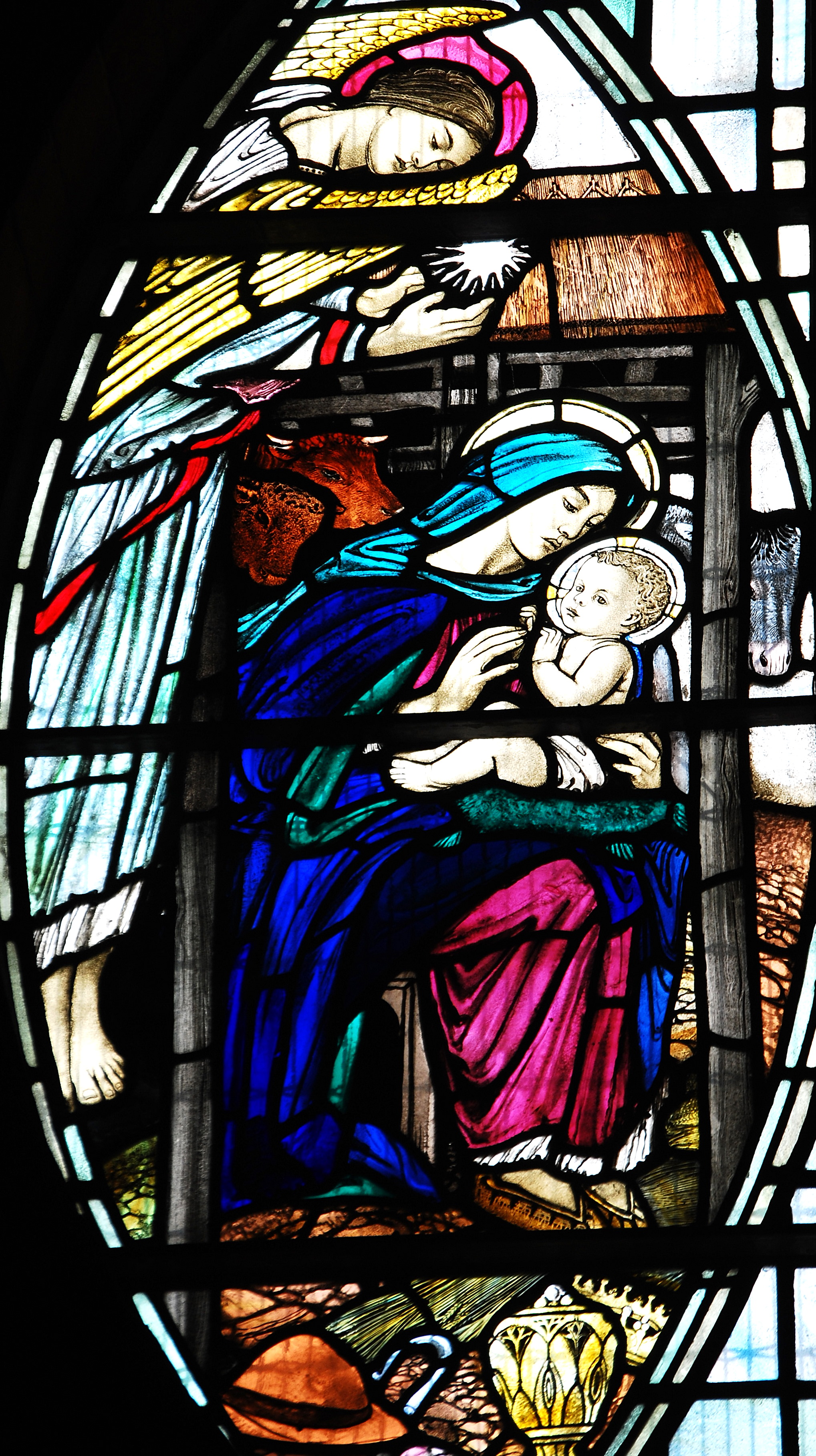
Nativity window in St Saviour Brookwood. Courtesy Andrew Loutit

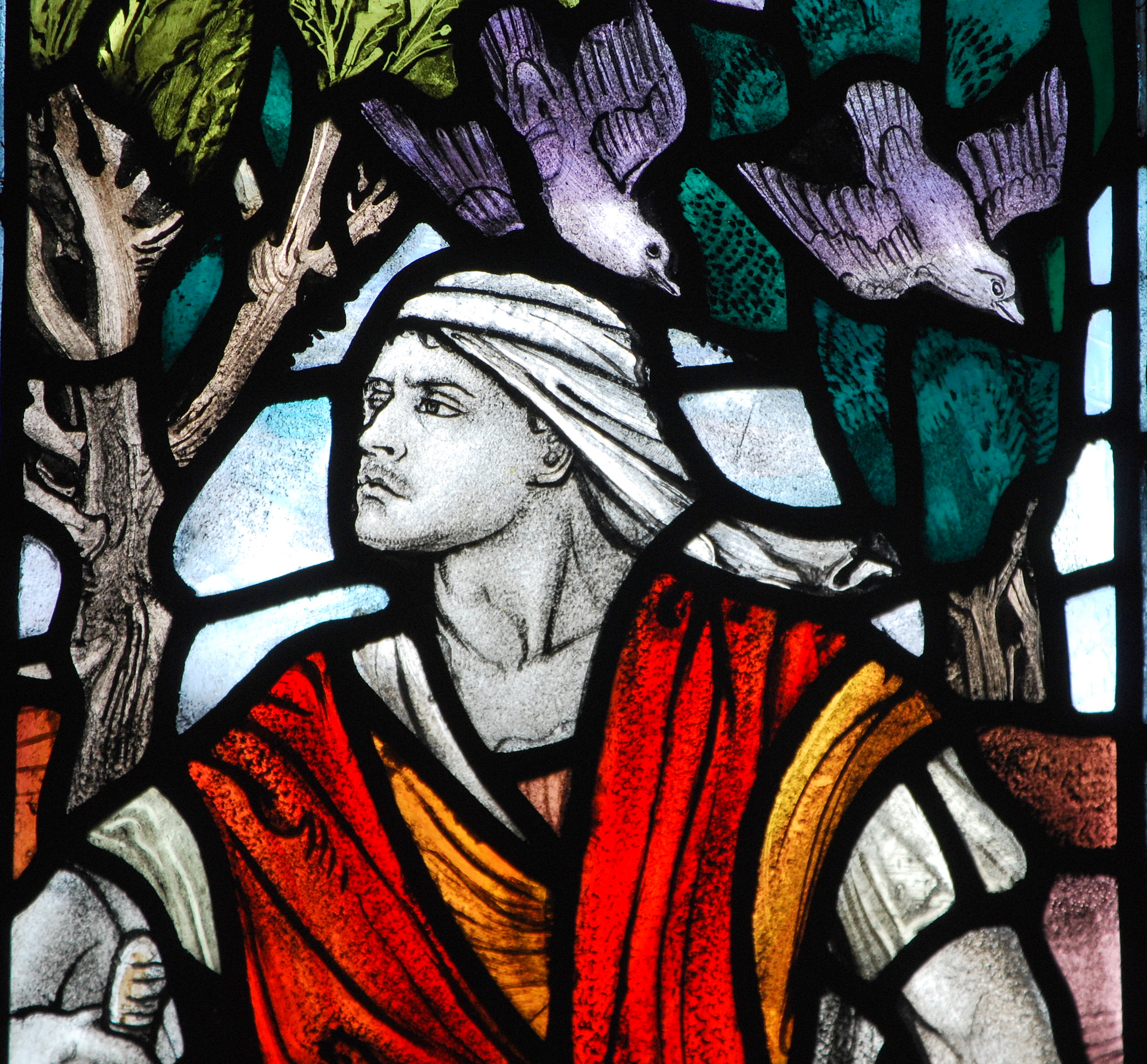
Part of Steeple Claydon window. Courtesy Andrew Loutit
