= Beatrice Emma Parsons =

British painter and botanical artist

- Born: 27 February 1869; Peckham, Surrey, England
- Died: 17 February 1955 (aged 85); Watford, Hertfordshire, England
- Education: King's College London, Royal Academy Schools
- Known for: Painting

Beatrice Emma Parsons (1869–1955) was a British painter and is best known for her watercolours of garden subjects. Parsons, along with George Samuel Elgood and Lilian Stannard, is considered one of the leading English painters of gardens.

== Personal life ==
Parsons was born in Peckham, Surrey, England in 1869. She was sister to Karl Parsons, a stained-glass artist, who commemorated their family in a stained-glass window in St Matthew's Church, Oxhey Village. Parsons attended the Haberdashers' Aske's School for Girls and studied at King's College London, before attending the Royal Academy Schools, where she won three prizes. She lived in Hampstead after 1901, until she moved to Oxhey in 1907, where she had a studio until her death on 17 February 1955. During her time in Oxhey, she lived with her three sisters.

== Career ==
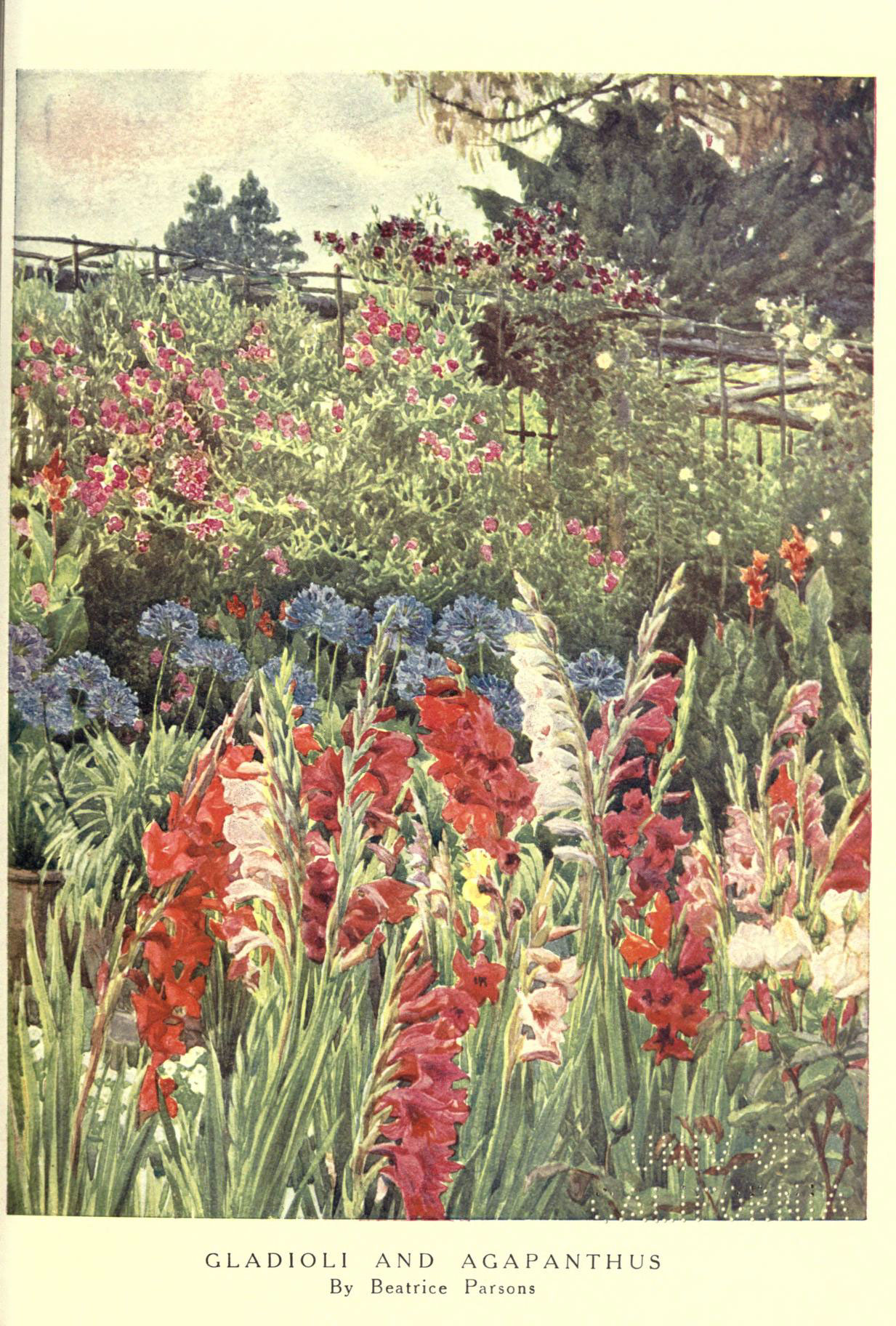
Gladioli and Agapanthus by Beatrice Emma Parsons

Although known for her garden paintings, Parsons originally experimented with historical and genre paintings and also created a few portraits, landscapes, and still-life paintings. She began painting, almost exclusively, garden subject watercolours in 1900. She painted in England, but also in Europe and Africa. Parsons preferred painting gardens in their summer colours, and specialized in the gardens of Devon, Cornwall and Somerset. Her work was featured on postcards and greeting cards during her time. Many of her paintings were used as illustrations in gardening books, such as Gardens of England (1908) and The Charm of Gardens (1910).

Parsons' work caught the attention of royals and aristocrats. Queen Mary purchased over 30 of her paintings, and some were bought by the Duchess of Westminster and the Duchess of Harewood. She painted gardens for Lord and Lady Hillingdon at Overstrand Hall, and was invited every year between 1921 and 1929 to Blickling Hall to paint the gardens there.

== Exhibitions ==
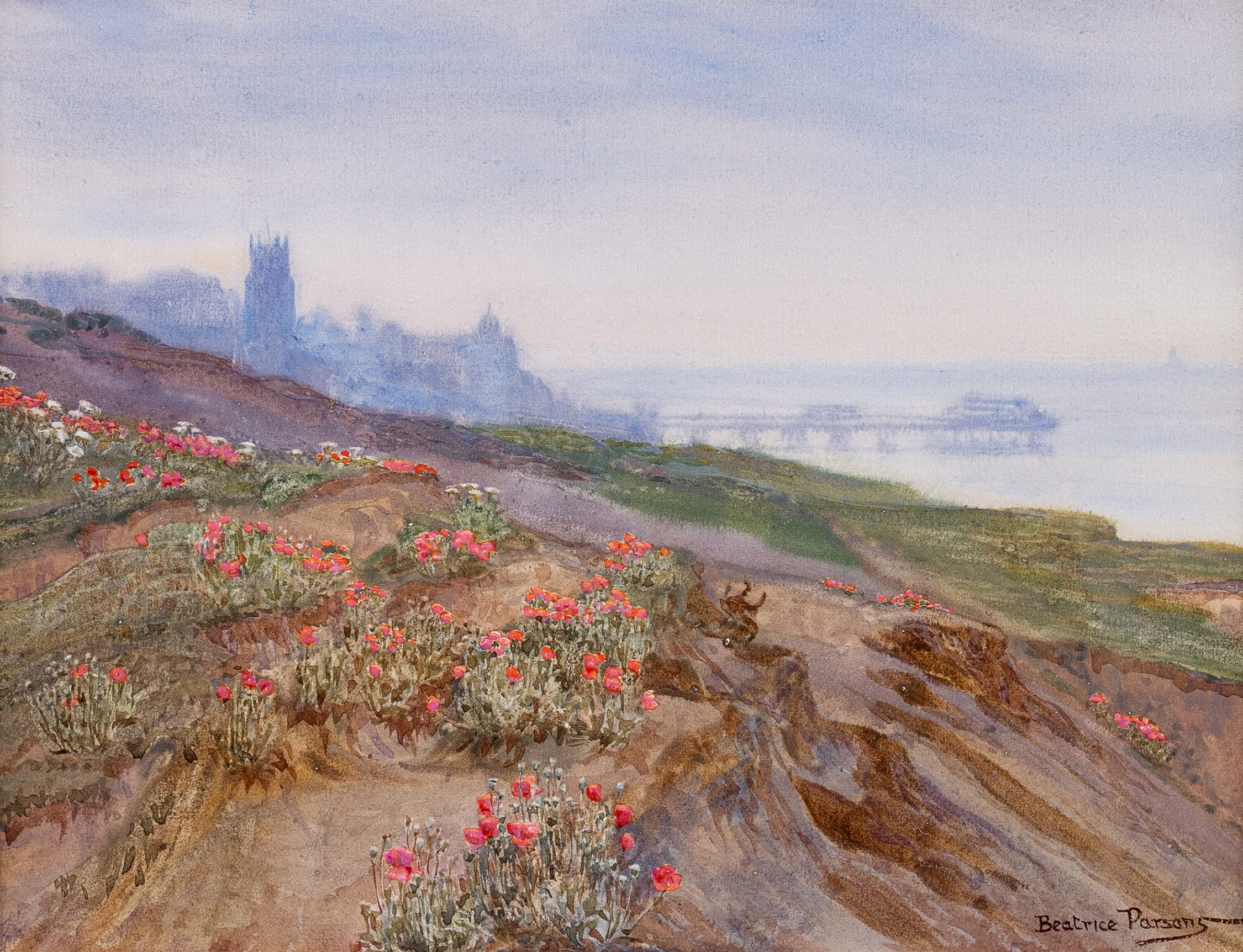
Cromer, from the East (circa 1900)

Parsons' first exhibition was at the Royal Academy in 1889. Her first solo exhibition, entitled 'Old English Gardens (Spring, Summer, Autumn & Winter)' was in 1904 at the Dowdeswell Gallery in London, and was a near sell-out. She exhibited regularly in London during her lifetime, having 22 solo shows between the Dowdeswell and Greatorex galleries.
