= All Saints Church, Porthcawl =

All Saints, Porthcawl
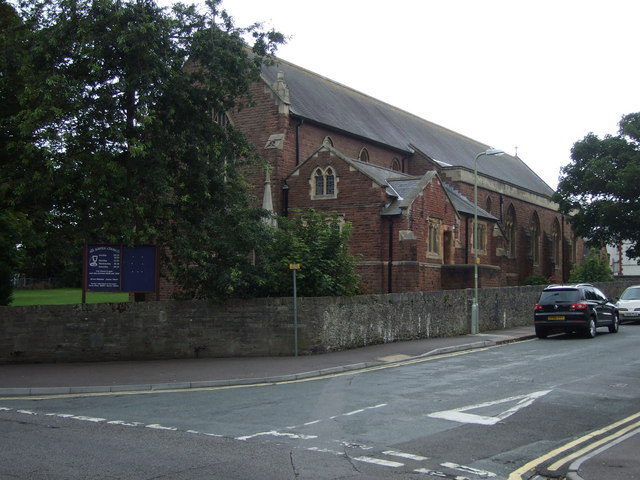
- All Saints, Porthcawl
- 51.4795°N 3.7058°W
- Denomination: Anglican

History
- Status: Active
- Founded: 1866

Architecture
- Functional status: Daughter Church
- Heritage designation: Grade II
- Designated: 27 February 1992
- Architect: G.E. Halliday
- Groundbreaking: 1912
- Completed: 1914
- Construction cost: £9750

Administration
- Diocese: Llandaff
- Deanery: Margam
- Parish: Newton-Nottage

All Saints Church, Porthcawl is a Listed Anglican church in the seaside resort of Porthcawl, South Wales. It is a daughter church of St John's in Newton, despite being considerably larger in size.

St John's, founded in the 1180s, proved sufficient for many years to handle the numbers of worshippers. Only after Porthcawl acquired a new harbour in the mid 19th Century did the population (and thus number of worshippers) begin to prove beyond the capacity of St John's.

The first All Saints was set up beside the harbour in 1866. This had a dual purpose as a school (the street is still called 'Old School Road'). It was replaced by a large tin tabernacle in 1892 (or 1899), which stood on the site of the present church, which replaced it in 1914. The church's original designs of 1909 envisaged a south-east tower, though this was not built and the gap is now bricked off. The church was later extended to the north-east in the 1960s, when a vestry and lady chapel were added. Listed status was granted in 1992.

The church's east window, installed in 1927, is the work of Karl Parsons.
