= Thomas Playfere =

English churchman and theologian

Thomas Playfere (also Playford) (1561? – 2 February 1609) was an English churchman and theologian, Lady Margaret's Professor of Divinity at Cambridge from 1596.

== Life ==
Born in London about 1561, he was son of William Playfere and Alice, daughter of William Wood of Bolling in Kent. He matriculated as a pensioner of St John's College, Cambridge, in December 1576, and on 5 November 1579 was admitted a scholar. He graduated B.A. in 1579–80, M.A. in 1583, B.D. in 1590, and D.D. in 1596; on 10 April 1584 he was admitted a Fellow. He contributed to the university collection of Latin elegies on Sir Philip Sidney (16 Feb 1586–7). He served the college offices of prælector topicus, 1587; rhetoric examiner, 1588, medical lecturer on Thomas Linacre's foundation; preacher, 1591; Hebrew prælector, 1593–4; senior fellow and senior dean, 1598; and principal lecturer, 1600. According to Joseph Foster he joined the Inner Temple in 1594, and in 1596 he was incorporated D.D. at Oxford.

After the death of William Whitaker, Master of St John's, Playfere and Richard Clayton were candidates for the mastership: Clayton was chosen. In December 1596 Playfere was elected Lady Margaret professor of divinity. He became chaplain to King James, and often preached before him at court. He also preached before Henry Frederick, Prince of Wales at Greenwich on 12 March 1605, and before the kings of England and Denmark at Theobalds, then the residence of Robert Cecil, 1st Earl of Salisbury, on 27 July 1606.

Playfere held the Crown living of Cheam in Surrey from 1605 to 1609. In 1608, he became rector of All Saints, in Shipdham, and of Thorpe St Andrew, Norfolk. On 4 November 1602 Chamberlain had written to Carleton that "Dr. Plafer, the divinity reader, is crazed for love", and after 1606 Playfere's mind gave way, but he held his professorship until his death, on 2 February 1609. His funeral sermon was preached by Thomas Jegon, vice-chancellor; John Williams made an oration on him in the college chapel. He was buried in the St Botolph's Church, Cambridge, where a monument with his bust, and a panegyrical inscription, was placed by desire of his wife Alicia.His widow Alice (née Grinlinge) remarried to Theophilus Feild on 7 February 1612 at the same church.

== Works ==
Playfere's reputation as a fluent preacher in Latin was high. Hr published some single sermons during his lifetime, and after his death appeared: Ten Sermons, Cambridge, 1610; a volume (1611), containing four sermons (including "The Pathway to Perfection"), each sermon with a separate title-page, and lacking a general title; Nine Sermons, Cambridge, 1612, dedicated to Sir Reynold Argal. The sermons were issued in one volume at London in 1623 and 1638.

== Notes ==
Attribution

This article incorporates text from a publication now in the public domain: "Playfere, Thomas". Dictionary of National Biography. London: Smith, Elder & Co. 1885–1900.
