= St Botolph's Church, Cambridge =

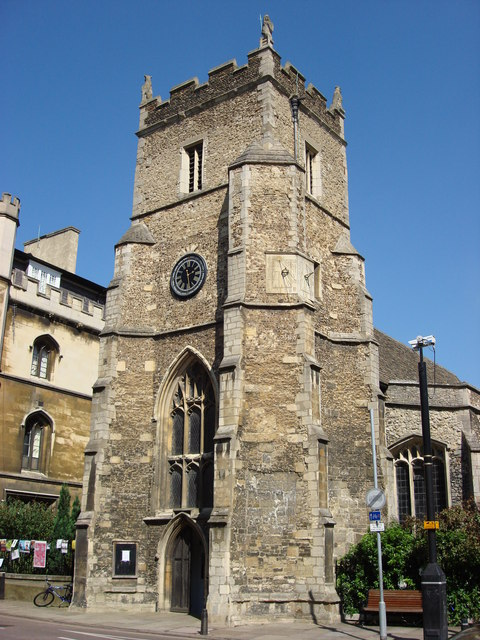
- St Botolph's Church tower
- St Botolph's Church, Cambridge
- 52.2025°N 0.1181°E
- Location: Trumpington Street, Cambridge, Cambridgeshire, CB2 1RG
- Country: England
- Denomination: Church of England
- Churchmanship: Book of Common Prayer
- Website: Church website

History
- Status: Active
- Dedication: Botolph

Architecture
- Functional status: Parish church
- Heritage designation: Grade I listed

Administration
- Diocese: Diocese of Ely
- Archdeaconry: Archdeaconry of Cambridge
- Deanery: Cambridge South Deanery
- Parish: St Botolph, Cambridge

Clergy
- Rector: The Rev'd Jonathan Collis

St Botolph's Church, Cambridge is a Church of England parish church in the city of Cambridge, England. The church is a Grade I listed building.

== History ==
The church is dedicated to Botolph, a seventh-century abbot in East Anglia, who is a patron saint of travellers. The church was built by the long-demolished south gate of medieval Cambridge, through which travellers from the south and west entered the town.

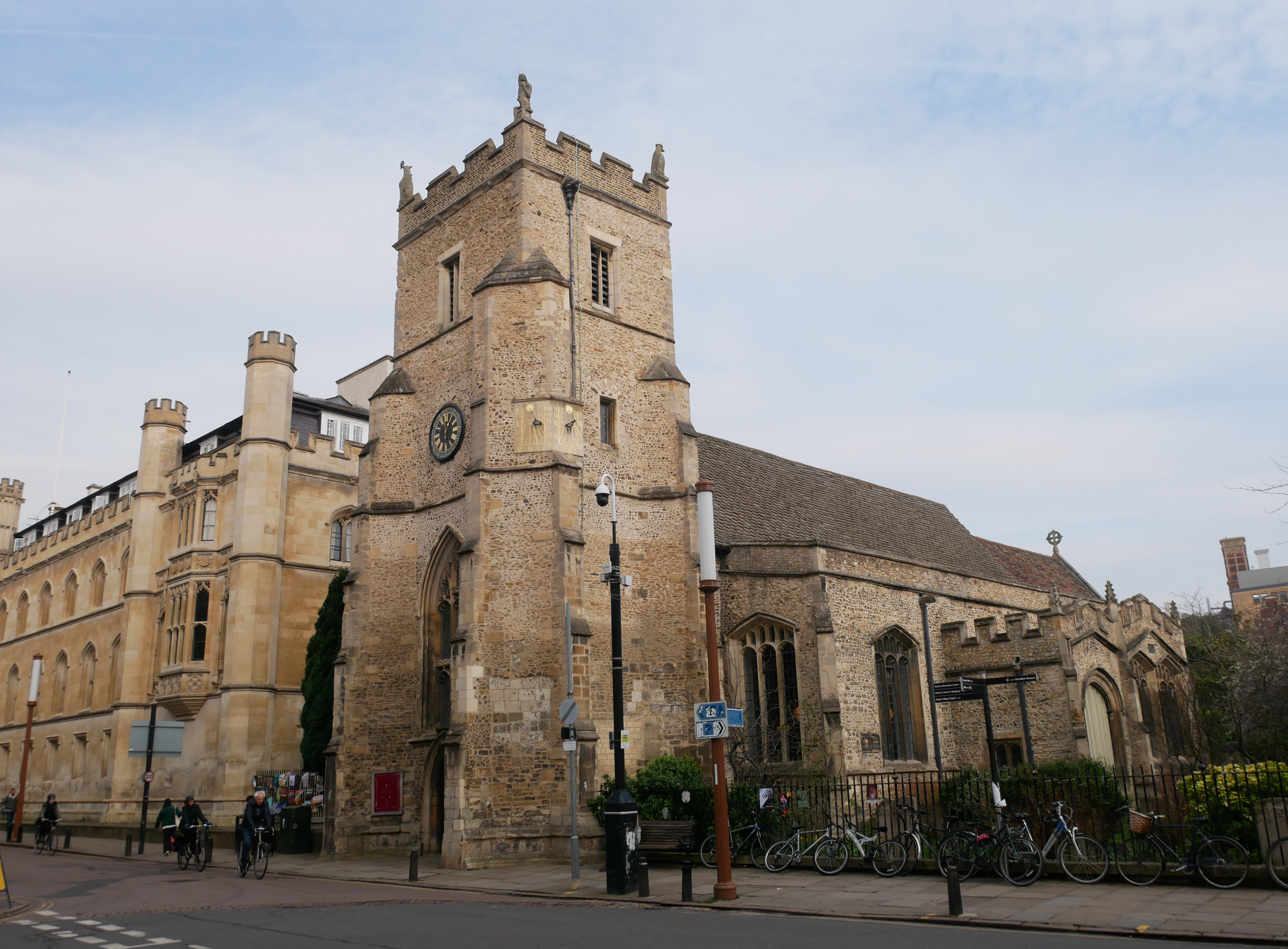
The Church of Saint Botolph in Cambridge, as seen from the southwest. Behind it is Corpus Christi College, Cambridge.

The present building mostly dates from the fourteenth century and is built of flint and rubble with Barnack stone dressing. The octagonal font of 1637 has a splendid Laudian wooden cover.

The tower was built in the fifteenth century. It is surmounted by stone figures representing the four evangelists (restored 1971) and has a sundial on the south-west buttress. The four bells were cast in 1460 and are still in use.

The elaborate chancel was rebuilt in 1872 by the Victorian architect George Frederick Bodley and worked on by local artists Frederick Leach and G. Gray. It is a fine example of high Victorian decoration and was conserved and restored in 2008 with help from the Heritage Lottery Fund. Bodley also designed the lectern. The church has the only medieval rood screen remaining in a Cambridge parish church; its paintings date from the late 19th-century restoration.

The South Chapel was refurbished in memory of those who died in the First World War. The war memorial window in the South Chapel was one of the earliest commissions of Rachel Tancock (later Rachel de Montmorency). The two-light window depicts St George and St Michael. The chapel also commemorates the First Eastern General Hospital, built at the outbreak of the First World War on what is now the Cambridge University Library site.

There are memorials to Thomas Playfere (1609, Lady Margaret's Professor of Divinity), James Essex (architect), members of the Darwin family, and Sir Ernest Barker.

On 26 April 1950, the church was designated a Grade I listed building.

In the early hours of 4 February 2020 the church was broken into resulting in the destruction of an 1870 stained glass window by Charles Kempe, depicting Botolph and Margaret of Antioch. In the first week of the church's online fundraiser over £3,000 was raised to repair the window and secure the church against further incidents, alongside repairs to the church's roof which had been stripped of its lead by thieves several months prior.

== Present day ==
The church is located at the intersection of Trumpington Street and Silver Street; the narrow Botolph Lane runs alongside the churchyard to the south and Corpus Christi College is to the north. The parish extends west, over the River Cam, into Newnham and includes several colleges.

== Gallery ==
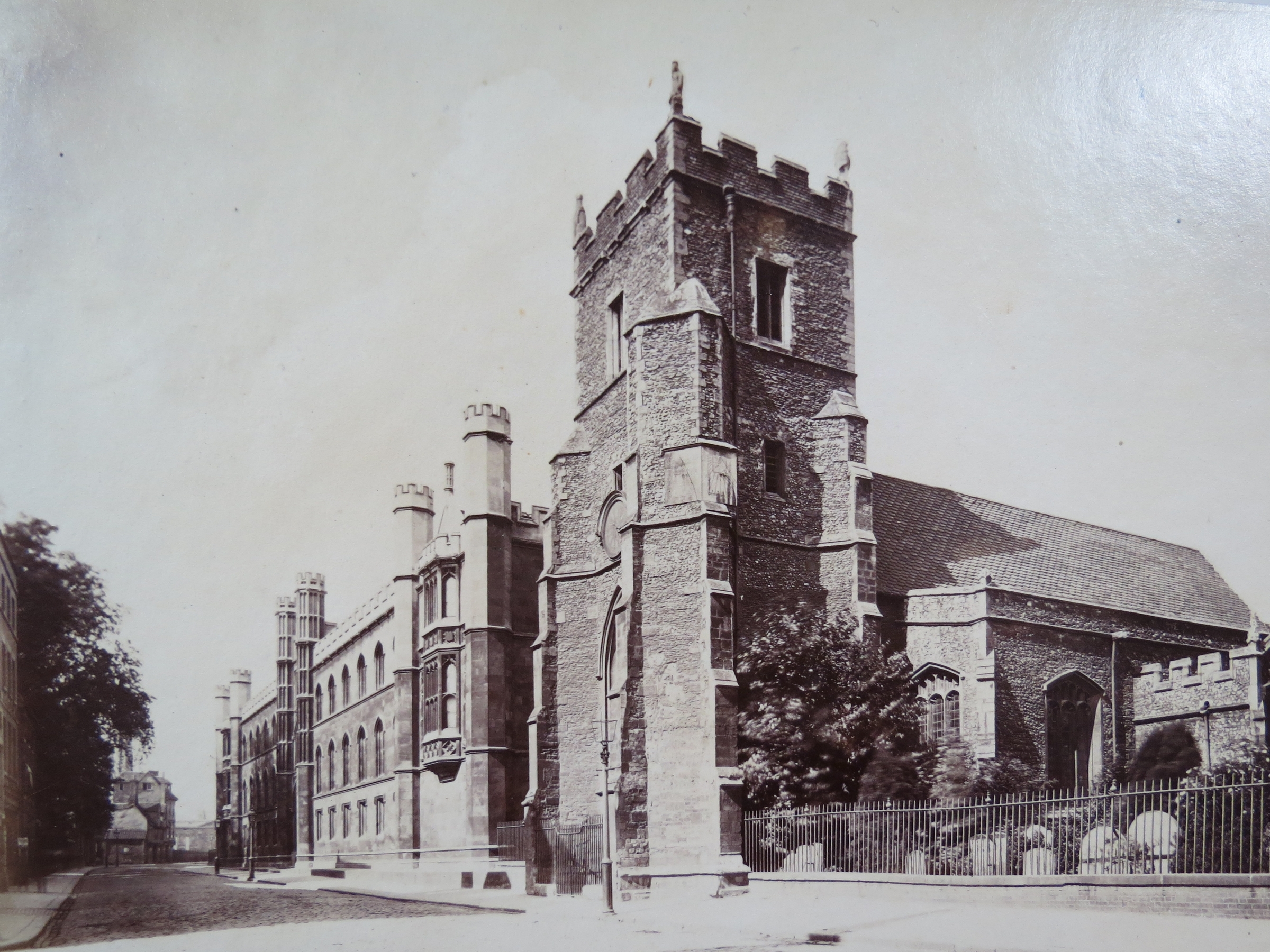
St Botolph's in circa 1870

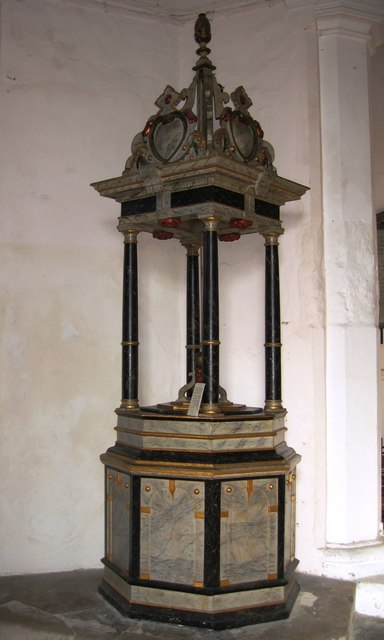
The Laudian font

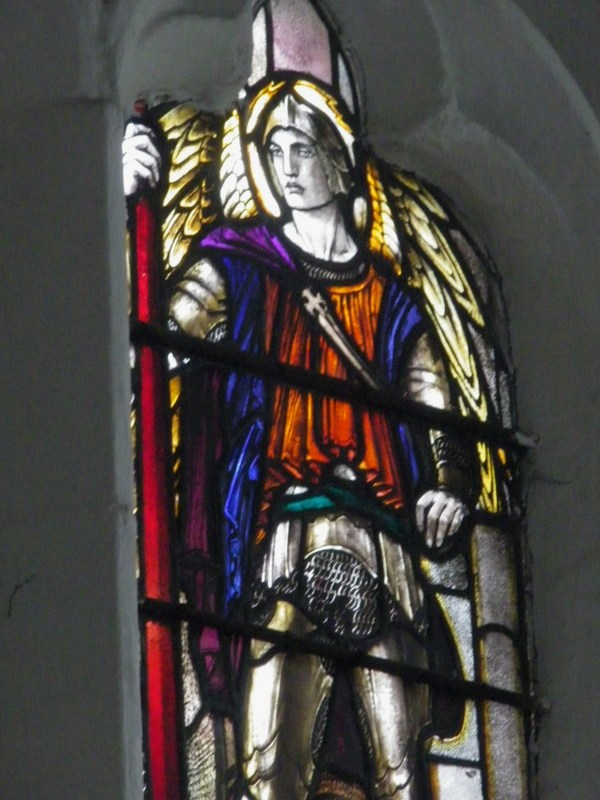
Stained glass window by Rachel Tancock

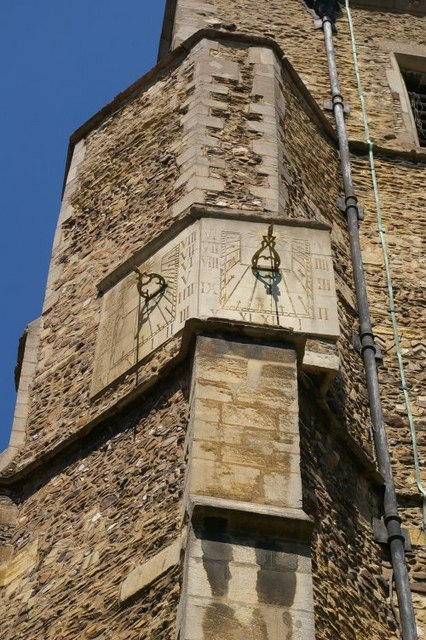
Sundial on a tower buttress

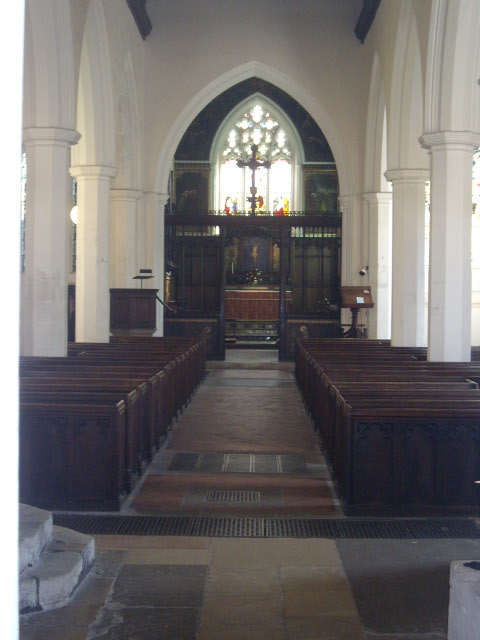
Interior, looking towards the chancel
