= Edward Woore =

British stained glass artist

- Born: 1880
- Died: 1960 (aged 79–80)
- Known for: Stained glass
- Notable work: See Works by Edward Woore

Edward Woore or Davie Woore (1880–1960) was a British stained glass artist and member of the British Society of Master Glass Painters. He was a student, apprentice and collaborator with Christopher Whall, a stained glass artist and leader in the Arts and Crafts movement.

== World War I ==
Woore served as a private in the Leicestershire Regiment in World War I and lost the sight of one eye. He was awarded the British War Medal, Victory Medal and the Silver War Badge following his injury.

== Stained glass ==
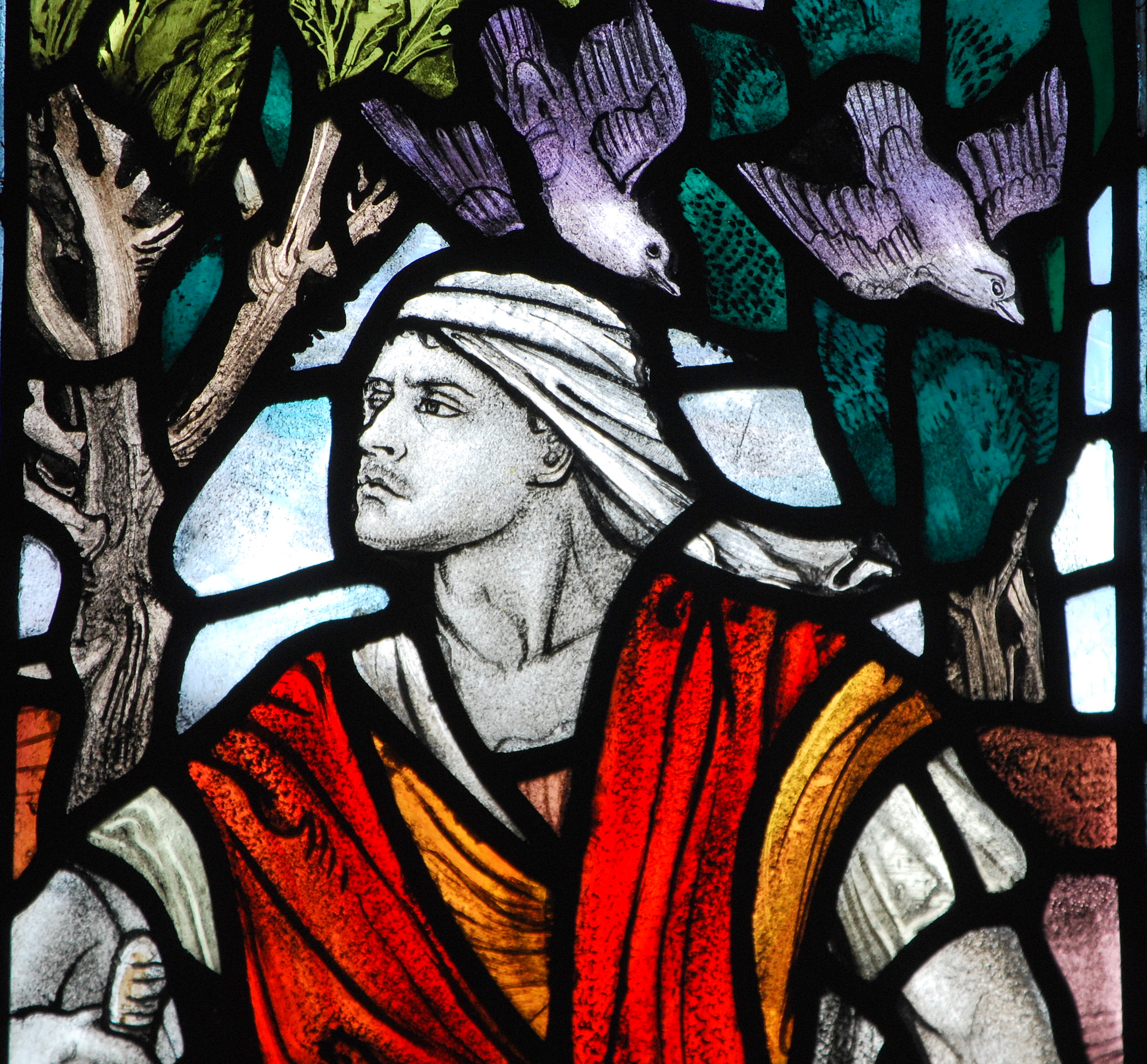
Detail of Woore window in Steeple Claydon Church, Buckinghamshire

Woore worked with Christopher Whall, who was a leading figure in the Arts and Crafts Movement. He first won a contest for schooling with Whall, was then his apprentice between about 1906 and 1912 and later a collaborator. Fellow apprentices included Arnold Robinson, Louis Davis and Karl Parsons. Parsons and Woore helped illustrate Whall's 1905 book Stained Glass Work.

He had had his own studio in Hammersmith in 1918. Just before Whall's death in 1924, Woore helped manage the Whall & Whall studio. Like other students of Whall's, Woore moved to Putney and had a studio and home there from 1924 to 1941.

In 1925 he spoke for the Art Workers Guild at the Translucent Glass for Decoration lecture. In 1930 Woore began working for his close friend Arnold Robinson, who took over the stained glass company of Joseph Bell and Sons in Bristol. He worked for Robinson until the end of World War II.

Woore was a friend of Karl Parsons and when Parsons' health problems caused him in 1933 to return from Shalbourne to Putney, he was given work by Woore. After Parsons' death on 30 September 1934, Woore took over and completed many of Parsons' commissions, such as the north transept window of St. George's Cathedral, Cape Town.

Three of his assistants during his career were Mary Hutchinson, Basil Jones and F. R. Gadsby.

He continued to work until 1958 when he retired to Wales. He died two years later in 1960.

== Exhibitions ==
His work was exhibited at:

- Royal Academy Summer Exhibitions, between World War I and II
- Colling Galleries
- Walker Art Gallery, Liverpool
- Stained Glass Designs at Maas Gallery

== See also ==
- Works by Edward Woore
