= Karl Parsons =

English stained glass artist (1884–1934)

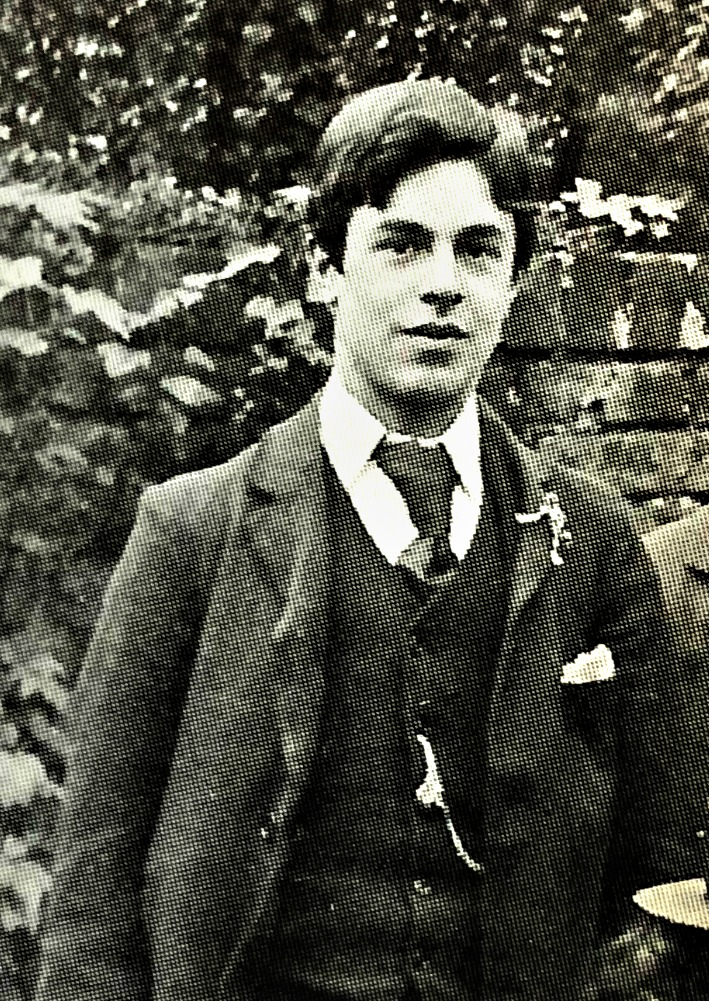
- Parsons in 1900
- Born: 23 January 1884; Peckham, London
- Died: 30 September 1934 (aged 50); Putney, London
- Education: Central School of Arts and Crafts
- Known for: Stained glass
- Movement: Arts and Crafts movement
- Spouse: Grace Millicent Simmons

Karl Bergemann Parsons (Note: Sometimes the spelling "Bergmann" is used, but in various census records and other official papers the spelling "Bergemann" was recorded) (23 January 1884 – 30 September 1934) was a British stained glass artist associated with the Arts and Crafts movement.

== Early life, 1884 – 1898 ==
Parsons was born in Peckham in south London on 23 January 1884, the 12th and youngest child of Arthur William Parsons (1838–1901), a foreign language translator, and Emma Matilda Parsons, née Bergemann (1837–1914). He was christened with the names Charles Bergemann, though the family always called him Karl, the name he was to use in later life. (Note: Several parts of these biographical notes have been taken from the William Morris Gallery Exhibition catalogue for their exhibition "Karl Parsons 1884-1934" held 24 October 1987 to 12 March 1988)

From 1893 to 1898 he attended Haberdashers' Aske's Hatcham Boys School at New Cross in south London.

== Introduction to Whall, 1898 – outbreak of war ==
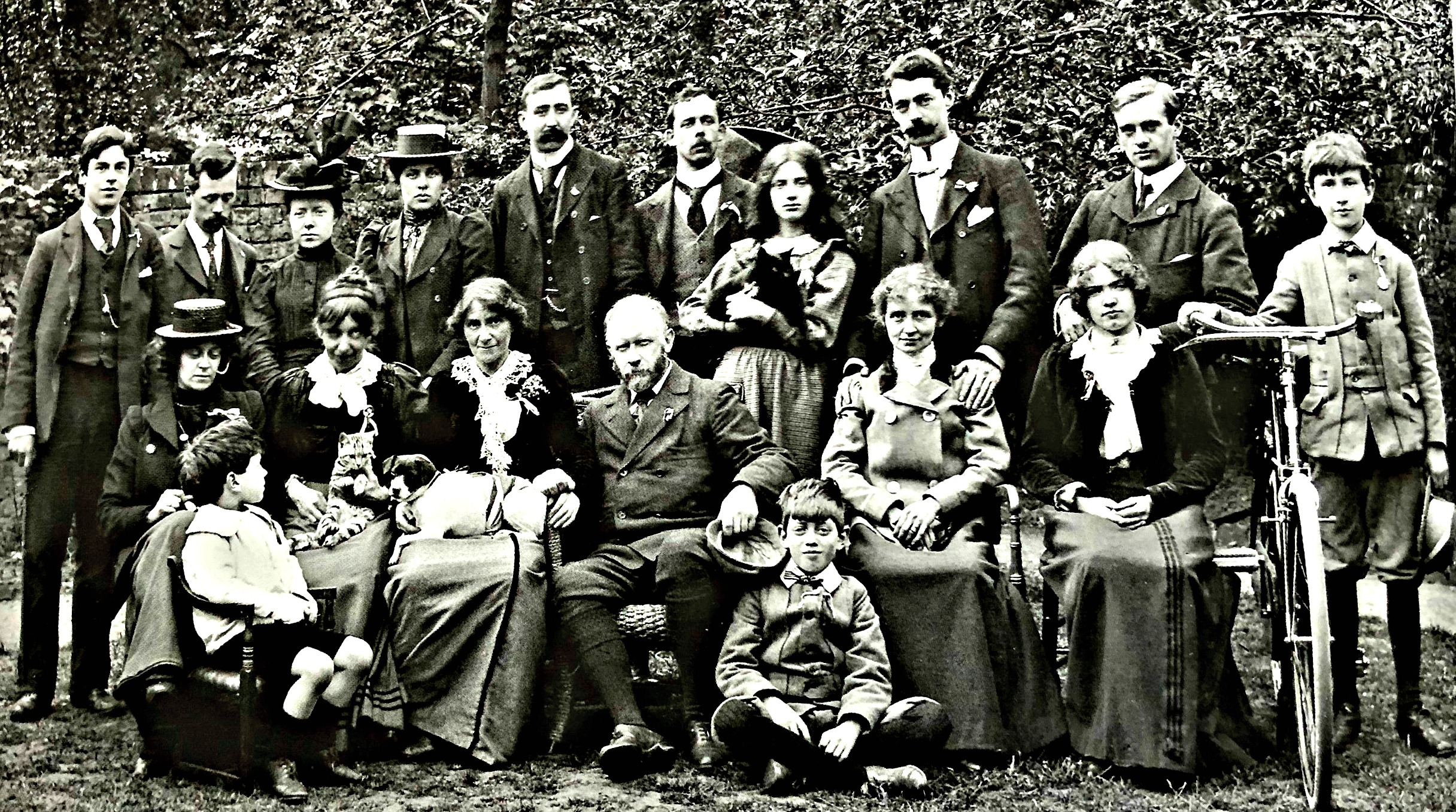
Garden party at Whall's house. Karl Parsons standing back row, first left.

One of Parsons' older sisters was the artist Beatrice Emma Parsons (1869–1955). Beatrice worked for a while in Christopher Whall's studio and when Parsons left school, Beatrice persuaded Whall to take him on as an apprentice. Whall it seems saw promise in Parsons' sketches. Apart from starting with Whall as a pupil-apprentice at Whall's Hammersmith studio, he also worked at Lowndes and Drury in Chelsea, this under Whall's supervision. He also attended Whall's classes at the L.C.C. Central School of Arts & Crafts.

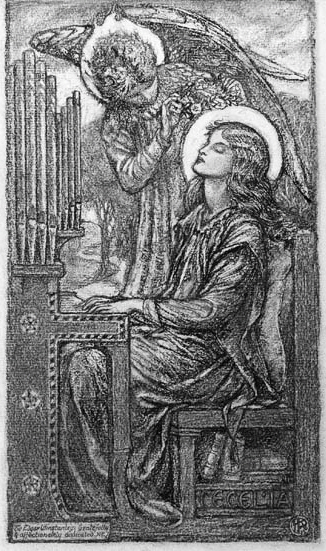
Chalk drawing of St Cecilia playing the organ.

He completed his apprenticeship in the 1900s and then worked as one of Whall's assistants. In September 1904 he began teaching at the Central School, initially as one of Whall's assistants and then as principal teacher of stained glass. One pupil was M. E. Aldrich Rope, cousin of Margaret Agnes Rope. Another pupil was Joan Fulleylove who worked with Mabel Esplin and in fact continued Esplin's work for the Anglican cathedral in Khartoum when Esplin could no longer do so.

Throughout the 1900s he was to assist Whall on his major commissions and in 1905 drew some of the illustrations for Whall's book Stained Glass Work (Note: Both Parsons and Edward Woore provided diagrams for the book and plant studies by Parsons were included in Plate XIV of the collotype illustrations. One of the diagrams (Figure 69) shows a special utensil for applying wax to the glass-painter’s easel, described by Whall as "the invention of one of my youngest "hands" (and heads)." This may well have been a reference to Parsons as the diagram is signed with his initials and it is certainly known that he used the "waxing-up" tool for his own work and recommended its use to his pupils.) this along with fellow student Edward Woore. Parsons assisted Whall with the windows for Gloucester Cathedral and also those for Canterbury Cathedral, Southwell Minster, Tonbridge School Chapel, and churches in Ashbourne, Ledbury and Burford.

In 1907 he married Grace Millicent Simmons. She too studied at the Central School and became an Arts and Crafts embroiderer.

In 1908 he worked with Whall on the design and execution of apse windows for Cape Town Cathedral and in that year set up his own studio at the Glass House in Fulham. (Note: see reference to The Glass House in Works of Christopher Whall) In the same year he began work on his first independent commission, a series of windows for St Alban, Hindhead. He also exhibited three designs at the Royal Academy and 25 September 1908 saw the birth of his daughter Margaret Rosetta.

It was the architect Herbert Baker who had asked Whall to take on the Cape Town windows and it was Baker's associate Fleming, who in later years was to invite Parsons to undertake other commissions in South Africa. (Note: After Parsons' death Baker wrote a letter to The Times in which he praised the "purity and richness of colour harmony" of the Cape Town and Johannesburg windows.) Close connections with architects were important to people like Parsons and he was to have a similar relationship with Robert Lorimer in Scotland which was to lead to his receiving important Scottish commissions. Other important contacts were John Duke Coleridge and Everard and Pick. (Note: John Duke Coleridge (1879-1934) was taught by Walter Cave and Edwin Lutyens. He was the architect of St Alban’s Church in Hindhead and St John’s Church in Rudmore. Everard & Pick were architects for St Peter’s in Bardon Hill and St Philip’s in Leicester.) Whall had similarly benefitted from close ties to the likes of the architects John Dando Sedding and Henry Wilson.

During the period 1909 to 1910, he worked for a short period with Louis Davis, cartooning windows from Davis' designs. In 1910 he exhibited designs at the Arts and Crafts Exhibition. Certainly Parsons worked closely with Davis in 1910 on the windows for St Anseln church (seven lancets for the Holy Spirit chapel) and Holy Trinity in St Andrew's Fife (a five-light Crucifixion window). It was Davis who had introduced Parsons to Robert Lorimer. In 1910, Parsons lived at 38 Gainsborough Road in Bedford Park, London.

1911 saw the birth of his second daughter, Jacynth Mary, who became a book illustrator.

In 1912 he received a commission for the Rolls and Grace memorial window at Eastchurch on the Isle of Sheppey and in the next year his work was exhibited at the Ghent International Exhibition. It was in 1913 that Parsons met the Irish artist Harry Clarke. (Note: Harry Clarke (1889-1931) was the most renowned Irish stained glass artist . He and Parsons became close friends. At one stage they had it seems talked of going into partnership but nothing came of the idea) One was to influence the other.

== 1914–1930 ==
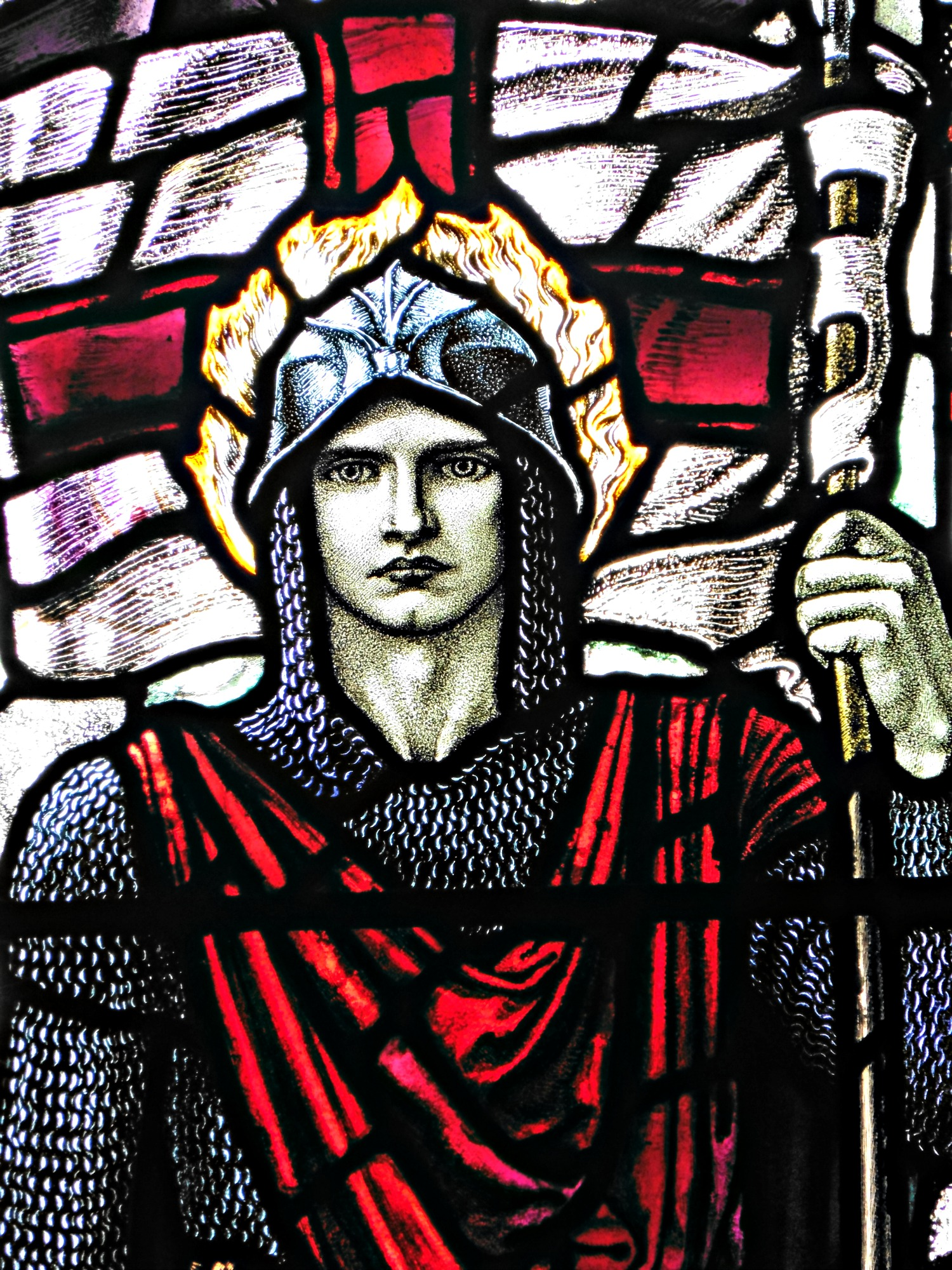
Detail of a stained glass window (1919), Church of St Laurence, East Harptree

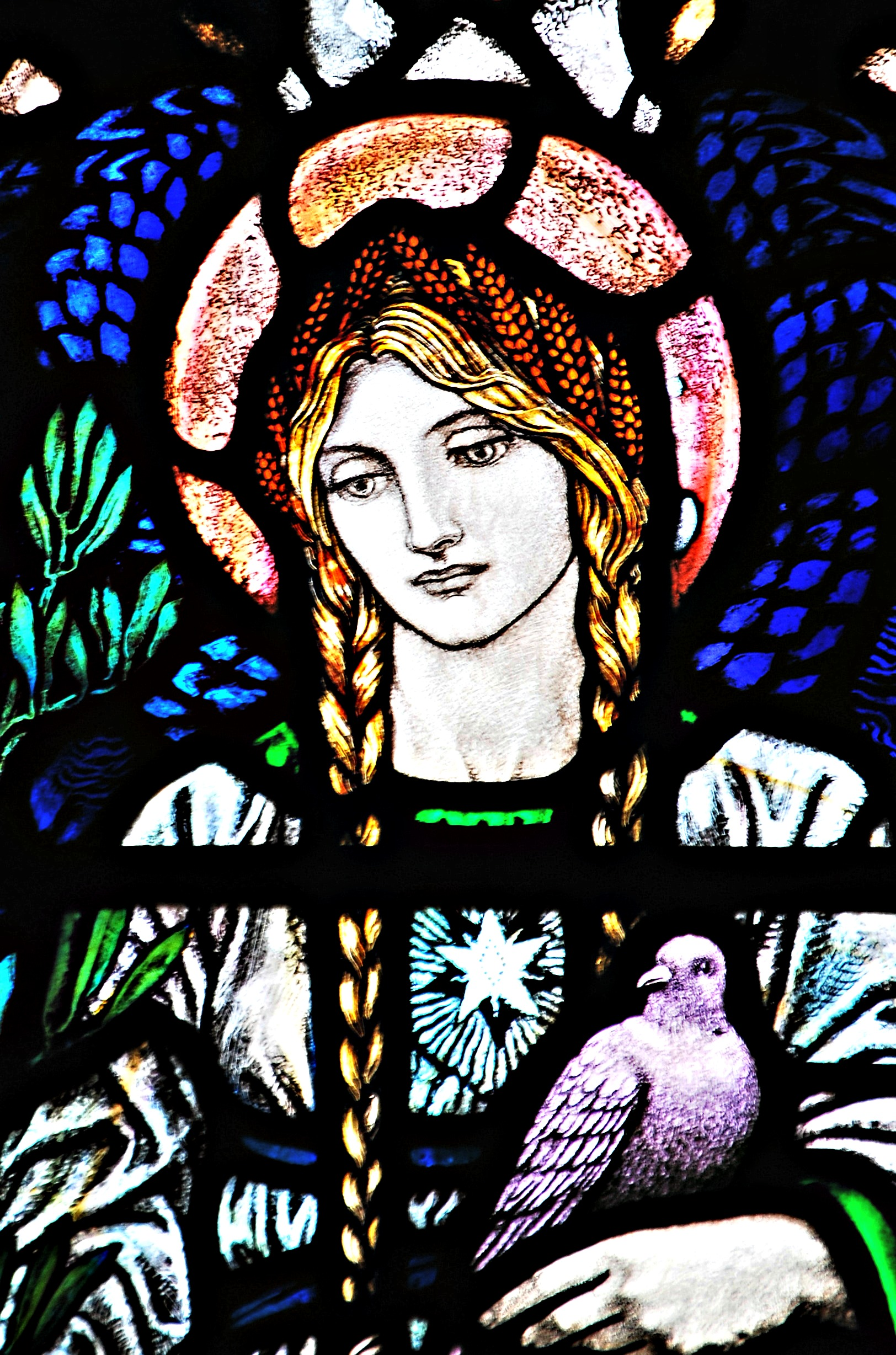
'Peace' window detail (1922) Christ Church, Fulham

The Great War saw many of the Glass House staff leave to do military service and in 1916 Parsons himself was conscripted into the Army but was not posted overseas.

Demobilised in 1918, he resumed work at the Glass House and went back to teaching at the Central School. As a teacher, Parsons was, like Whall before him, to inspire several of his pupils to become stained glass artists, including Lilian Pocock, Joseph Edward Nuttgens and Herbert Hendrie. (Note: Lilian Pocock (1883-1974). Worked for a time as Parsons' assistant before starting out on her own. Joseph E.Nuttgens (1892-1982). A student at the Central School, Nuttgens carried out work for other artists as well as working independently. Herbert Hendrie (1887-1946) was Parsons' pupil at Royal College of Art. Was appointed Head of Design at the Edinburgh College of Art and most of his stained glass work was carried out in Scotland)

After the war there was a boom in demand for stained glass, particularly with many memorial windows being commissioned and Parsons appointed Edward Liddall Armitage (Note: Edward Liddall Armitage subsequently set up his own studio and became principal stained glass designer for James Powell & Sons) as an assistant and later Leonard Potter. Both were ex-pupils.

1924 saw Parsons make what was to prove a seminal visit to Chartres where, with his brother Ambrose, he carried out a detailed study of medieval glass. Parsons wrote "So far as my knowledge goes, this world cannot show anything made by men so amazingly beautiful".

In 1927 he was commissioned to make the apse windows for the new St Mary's Cathedral in Johannesburg.

1929 saw a collection of poems that he had written published by the Medici Society under the title Ann’s Book. His daughter Jacynth provided the illustrations. (The previous year she had illustrated Forty Nine Poems by W. H. Davies, also for Medici). Over the years Parsons had several of his poems published in anthologies and periodicals. In the same year he resigned from his teaching post at the Central School.

== 1930 to 1934 – final years ==
In 1930 Parsons moved from Northwood, where he had lived for many years, to Shalbourne in Wiltshire. There he set up a studio at Ropewind Farm where he converted a mid-18th century three-bay barn, adding a large, porch-like window to let in natural light on the north side. He also incorporated a small granary on unusual brick and timber staddles thus converting it into a larger purpose-built storage building and garage, giving access directly from Rivar Road. The house he lived in adjoined the site. His health deteriorated and finally, in 1933, he had to return to London, took a flat in Putney and worked for a while with his friend Edward Woore. He died there the following year at the young age of 50. After his death on 30 September 1934, the cause of death being given as cerebral thrombosis and arteriosclerosis, existing commissions were taken over or completed by Woore.

== Works ==
Painting, sculpture, tapestry and every other craft we appreciate by the light that falls on it. But stained glass we can only see by the light coming through it. The glass worker, in fact, designs in coloured light".
Parsons

== Gallery ==
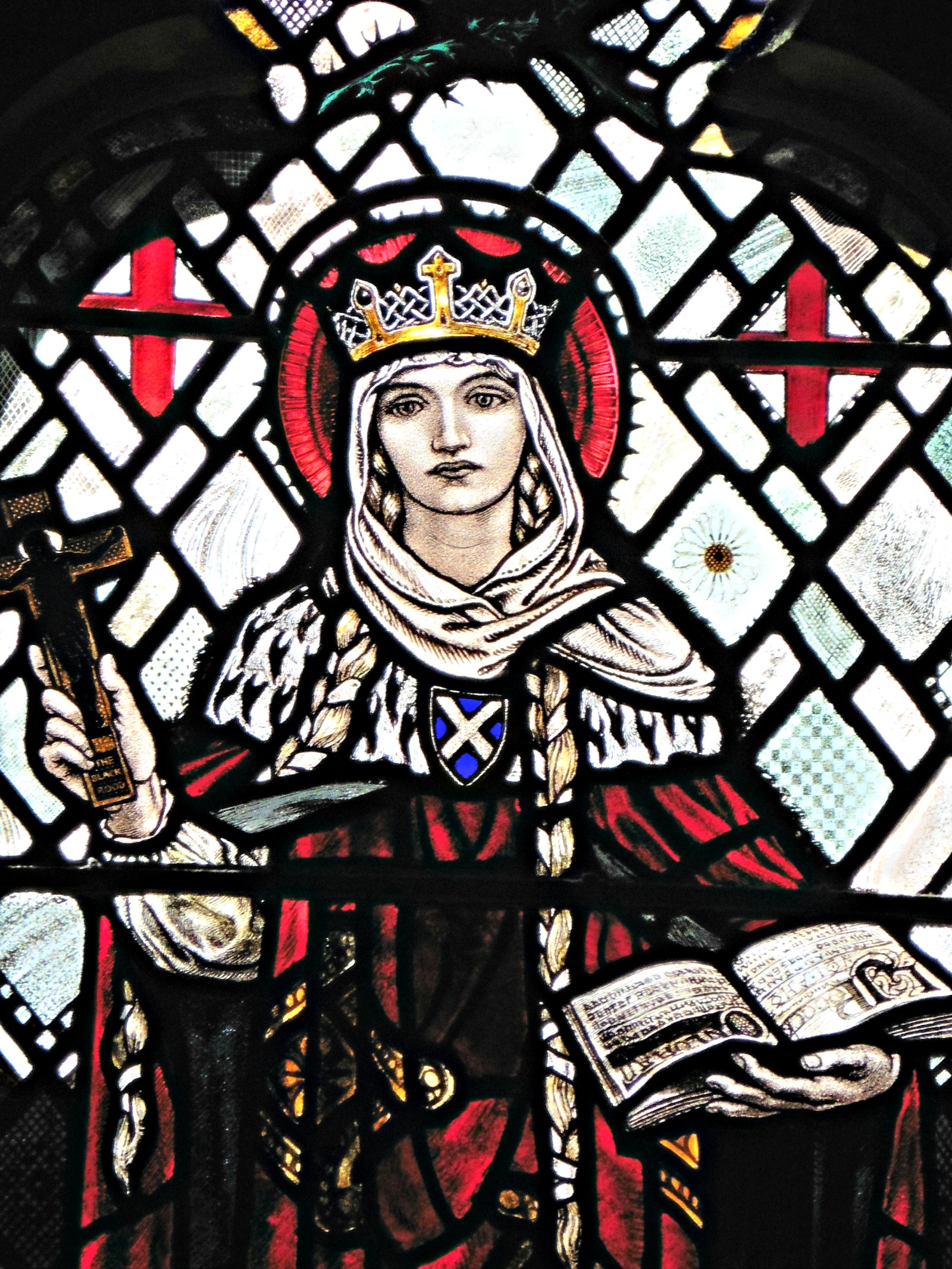
St. Margaret, St Giles' Cathedral, Edinburgh (1915)

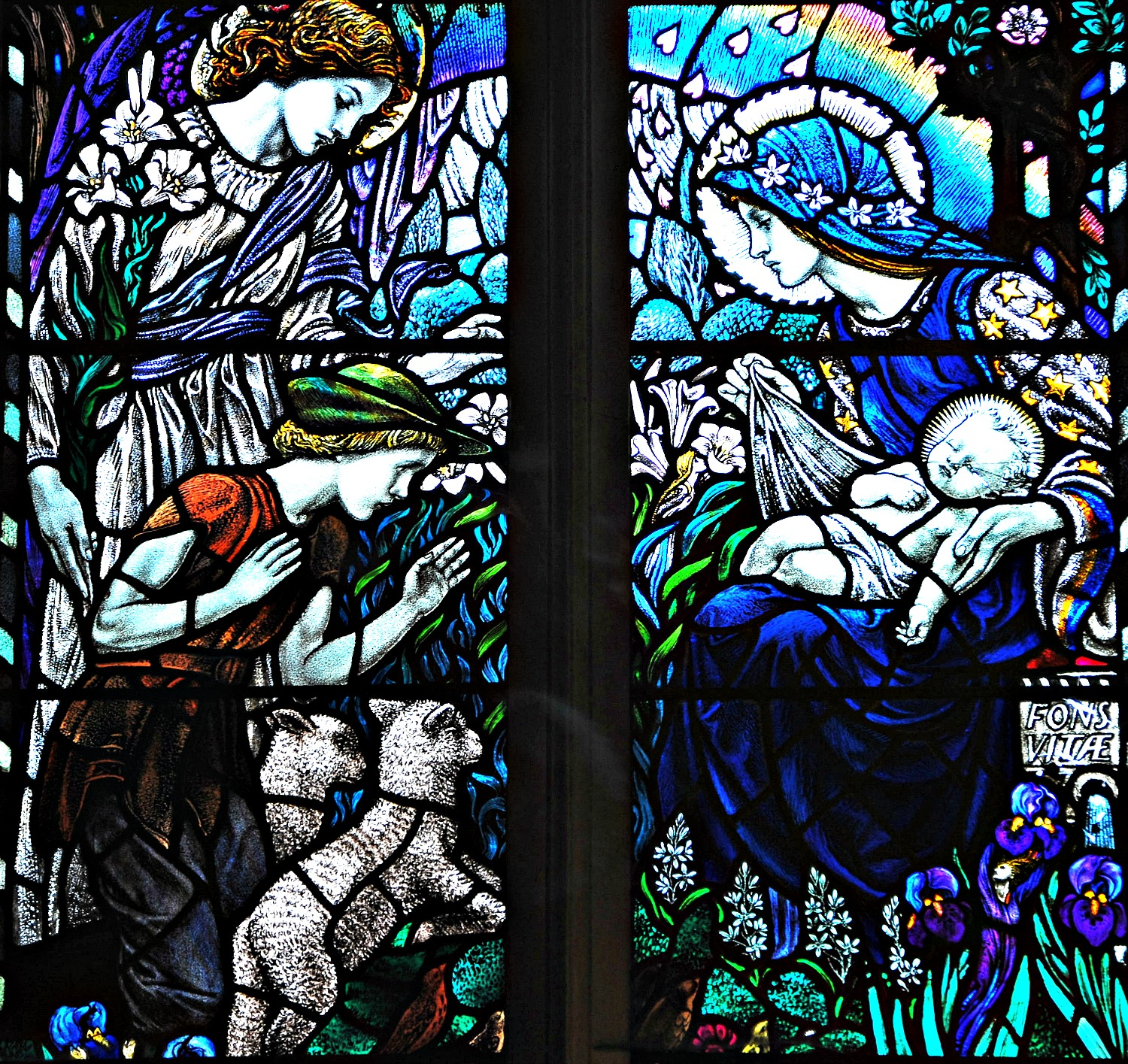
St. George, St. Michael and Nativity (1919) St. James Church, Pangbourne, Berkshire

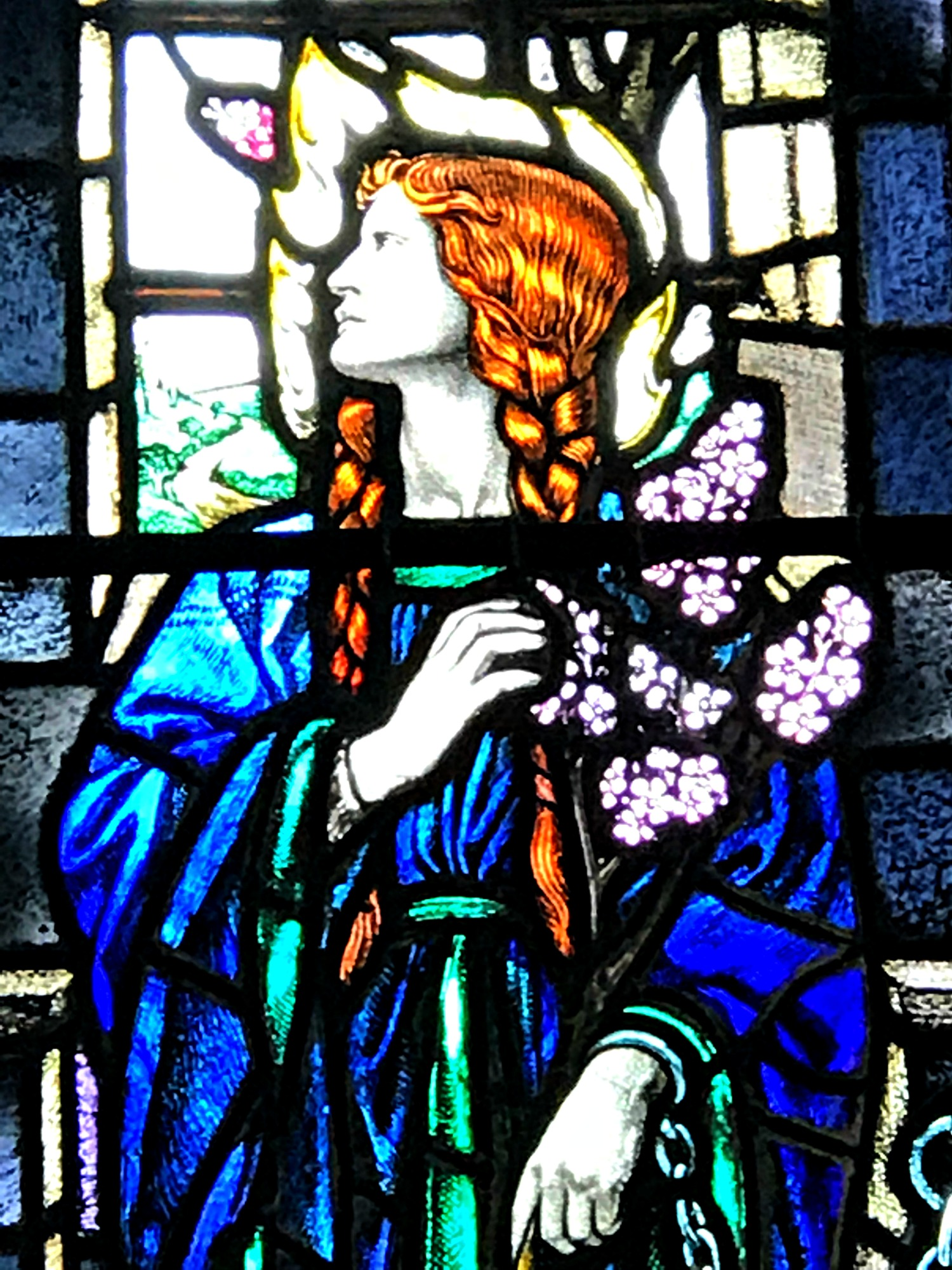
Fortitude and Hope (1912), All Saints Church, Eastchurch, Sheppey, Kent

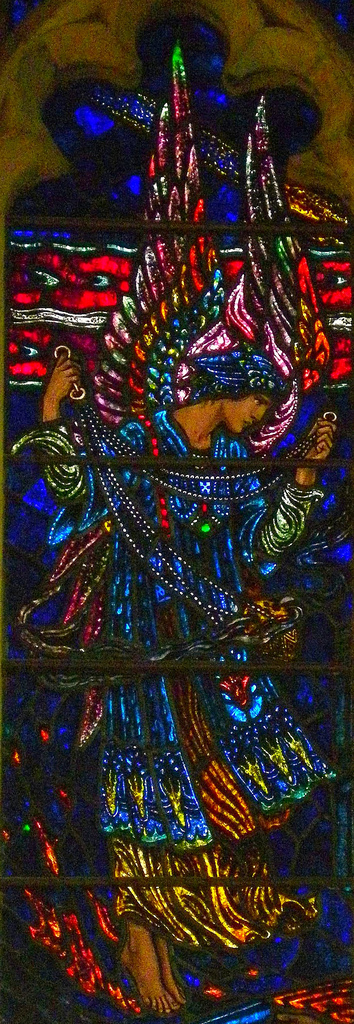
Detail from east window, All Saints Church, Porthcawl

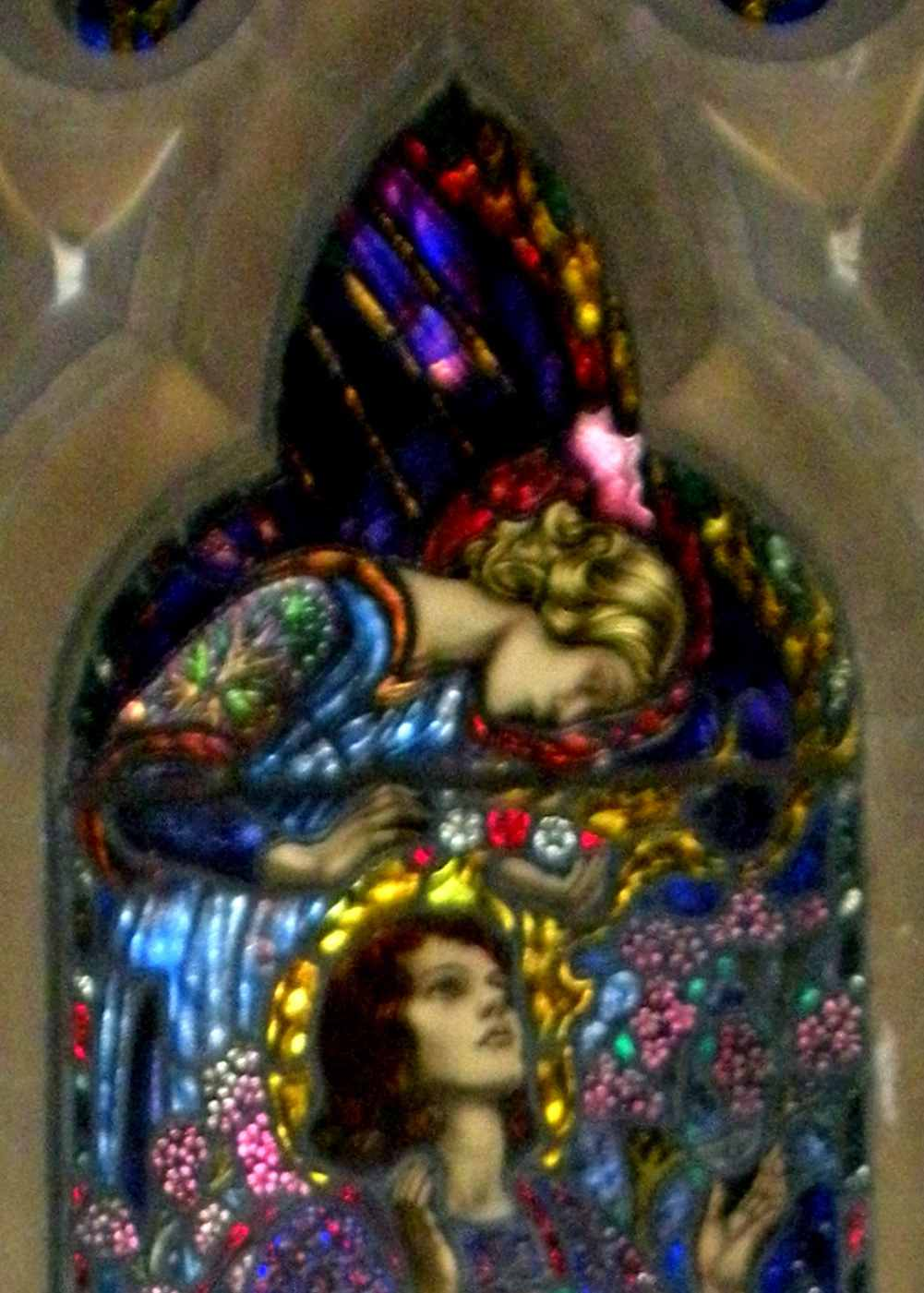
St Cecilia and Angel, St Michael and All Angels Church, Waterford, Hertfordshire (1929)

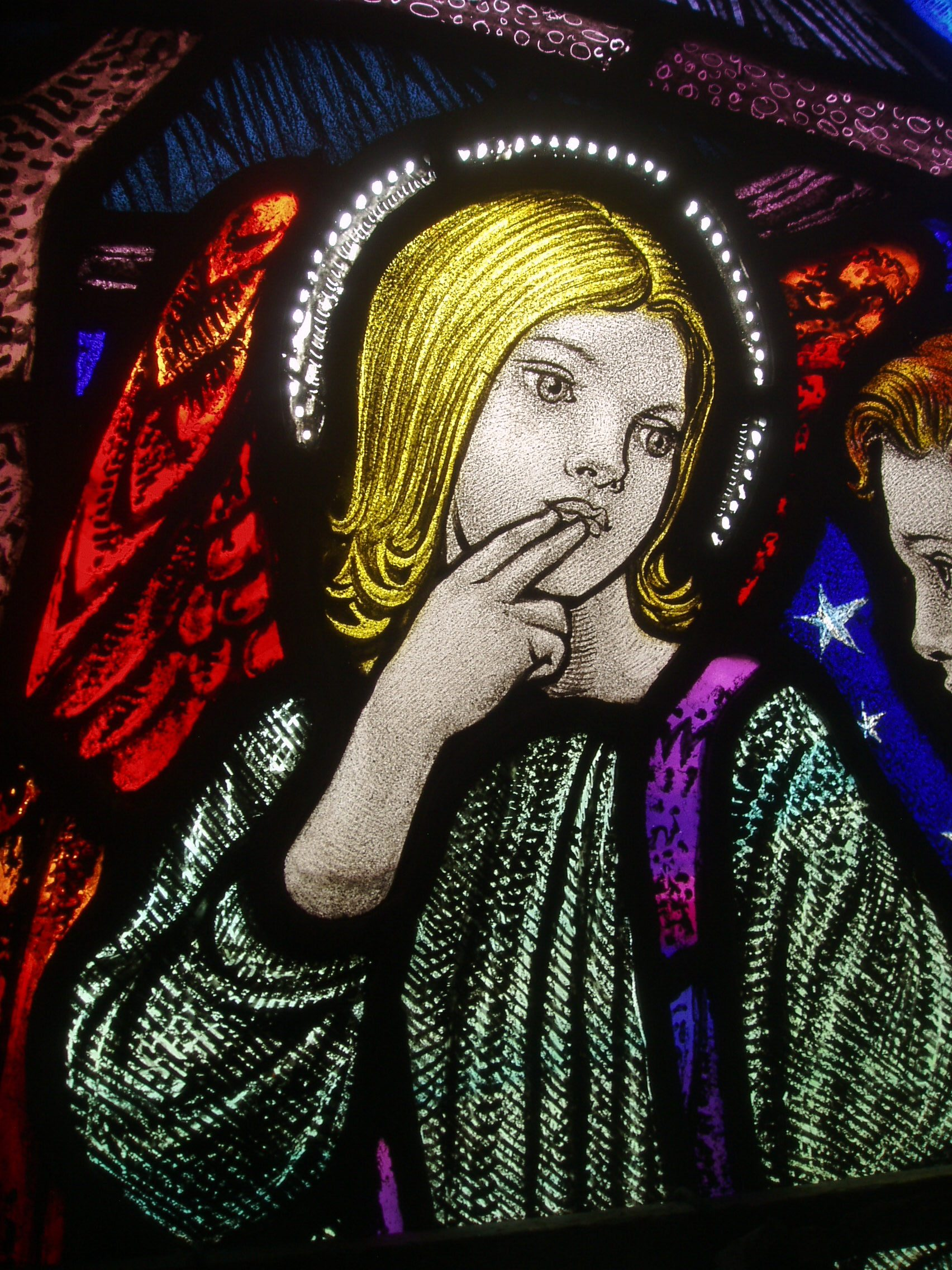
Christ in Majesty, St Laurence Church, Ansley, Warwickshire (1931)
