= Master of War =

Master of War, Warmaster, or variations thereof may refer to:

== Music ==
- Warmaster (band), a Dutch death metal band

=== Albums ===
- Masters of War (album), a 2007 album by Mountain
- War Master (1991 album), a death metal album by Bolt Thrower

=== Songs ===
- "Masters of War", a 1963 song by Bob Dylan
- "War Master", a song by Bolt Thrower off the 1991 album War Master
- "Warmaster", a song by Susperia off the 2002 album Vindication (Susperia album)

== Other uses ==
- Warlord, a master through the means of war
- Warmaster, a tabletop wargame
- The War Master (audio drama series), a 2017 Doctor Who audio play
- Master of War, a series of military-action novels by David Gilman
- Warmaster, a DC Comics supervillain enemy of Wonder Woman
- The Warmaster, ringname of mixed martial artist Josh Barnett
- The Warmaster, a 2017 novel by Dan Abnett, part of the novel series Gaunt's Ghosts

== See also ==
- War (disambiguation)
- Master (disambiguation)
- Warlord (disambiguation)
- War chief (disambiguation)
