= 武神 =

武神 may refer to:

- God of War, South Korean television series aired on MBC
- Warlord, Hong Kong comics

== See also ==
- The dictionary definition of 武 at Wiktionary
- The dictionary definition of 神 at Wiktionary
- God of War (disambiguation)
- Guardian of Darkness (暗黒神伝承 武神), Japanese OVA anime series
- Warlord (disambiguation)
