= War chief =

War chief may refer to

- Warlord, a leader able to exercise military, economic and political control over a subnational territory, within a sovereign state, due to their ability to mobilize loyal armed forces
- Skiagusta, a Cherokee war chief
- Tustenuggee, the war chief of a town in the Muscogee Confederacy
- The War Chief, a Time Lord character in the Doctor Who serial The War Games
- Age of Empires III: The WarChiefs

== See also ==
- Chief (disambiguation)
- War (disambiguation)
- Warlord (disambiguation)
- Master of War (disambiguation)
- Chief of War, a television series
