= Gouda by Candlelight =

Gouda by Candlelight is a Christmas event with music, theatre, and singing in the big market square in the town of Gouda, the Netherlands.

The tradition began in 1956, when the market of Gouda was decorated with a large Christmas tree, lit by candles in front of the old medieval town hall. It is the oldest and largest 'Christmas lights evening’ of the Netherlands. The tree is now bestowed each year by the Norwegian sister town of Kongsberg, the result of a personal initiative of the then Deputy Mayor Hagedorn of Gouda. A few years earlier during a jazz music festival in Gouda, he had met with the musical group Kongsberg Byorkester, and they talked about how lovely the dark square would look with a large tree with lights in the market square. Because the Kongsberg Byorkester had felt such a warm welcome in Gouda they decided to send a big Christmas tree as a gift from Kongsberg to her sister town Gouda. And after that year they've sent a tree every following year.

The Norwegian Christmas tree is a tall one, between 50 and 60 feet (17–20 meters). During a ceremony in presence of an official delegation of the two sisters towns, the tree is cut in the woods of Kongsberg and shipped off. After a long journey from Norway via England to Rotterdam Port it gets transferred to a large truck which brings it to Gouda. Here the school children welcome the tree during a short arrival ceremony and they bring it to the Market Square, where people from Cyclus (a Gouda company) decorate the tree and prepare it for the Gouda by Candlelight festival.

Two years after the beginning in 1956, the ‘Gouda Kaarsenfabriek’ (candle factory) celebrated its 100th anniversary. This led to a plan to not only illuminate the tree but also all the windows of the medieval town hall and all houses around the market with candles.

Until 2012 Candle light evening always took place either the second or third Tuesday in December. Around 7:30 pm the Christmas tree was lit by the Mayor of Gouda, in the presence of the mayor of Kongsberg, the people of Gouda and other national and international guests and visitors.

During the evening ceremony the street and shop lights are extinguished and during a community singing spectacle the market square and adjacent streets are lit up by thousands of candles, provided for free by the main sponsor of the event, Gouda Candles (Bolsius).

Gouda by Candlelight starts around 2 pm and over the years the programme has been extended and renewed every year. Every year new forms are sought and music groups invited by a group of volunteers who organize the event. Since 2013 Gouda by Candlelight takes place on Fridays. The 60th jubilee edition was in 2015 on December 11.

Every year about 20,000 people visit Gouda during this weekend. The 50th edition in 2005 attracted thirty thousand visitors from the Netherlands and abroad, including then-Queen Beatrix of the Netherlands.

Gouda extends its Christmas atmosphere to the weeks after Gouda by Candlelight with a Candlelight Shopping evening on the following Saturday, and an ice skating track starting a few days later.

To improve sustainability, since 2008 the Christmas tree has been decorated with 10.000 LEDs instead of the standard 200 bulb lamps. The LED lighting consumes much less power (800 watts) than incandescent bulbs (5300 watts). After the Christmas period the tree is taken down and recycled, and several art works have been made of the tree by artist Jan Mostert.
