= Gouda, South Holland =

City and municipality in Netherlands

Gouda
- City and municipality
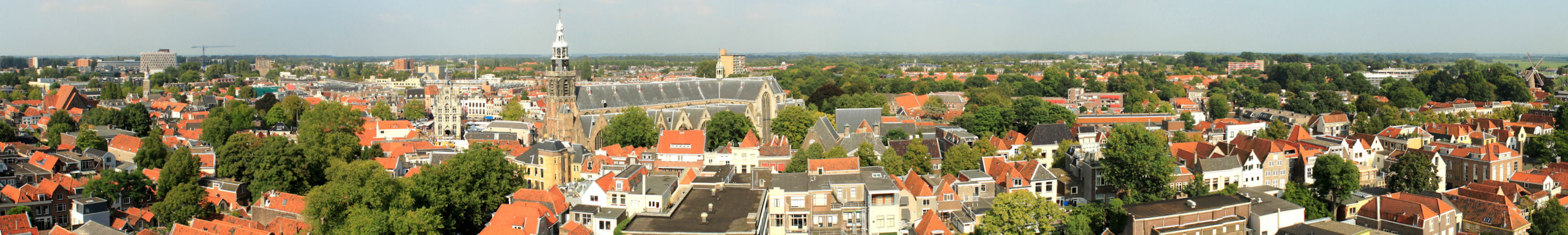
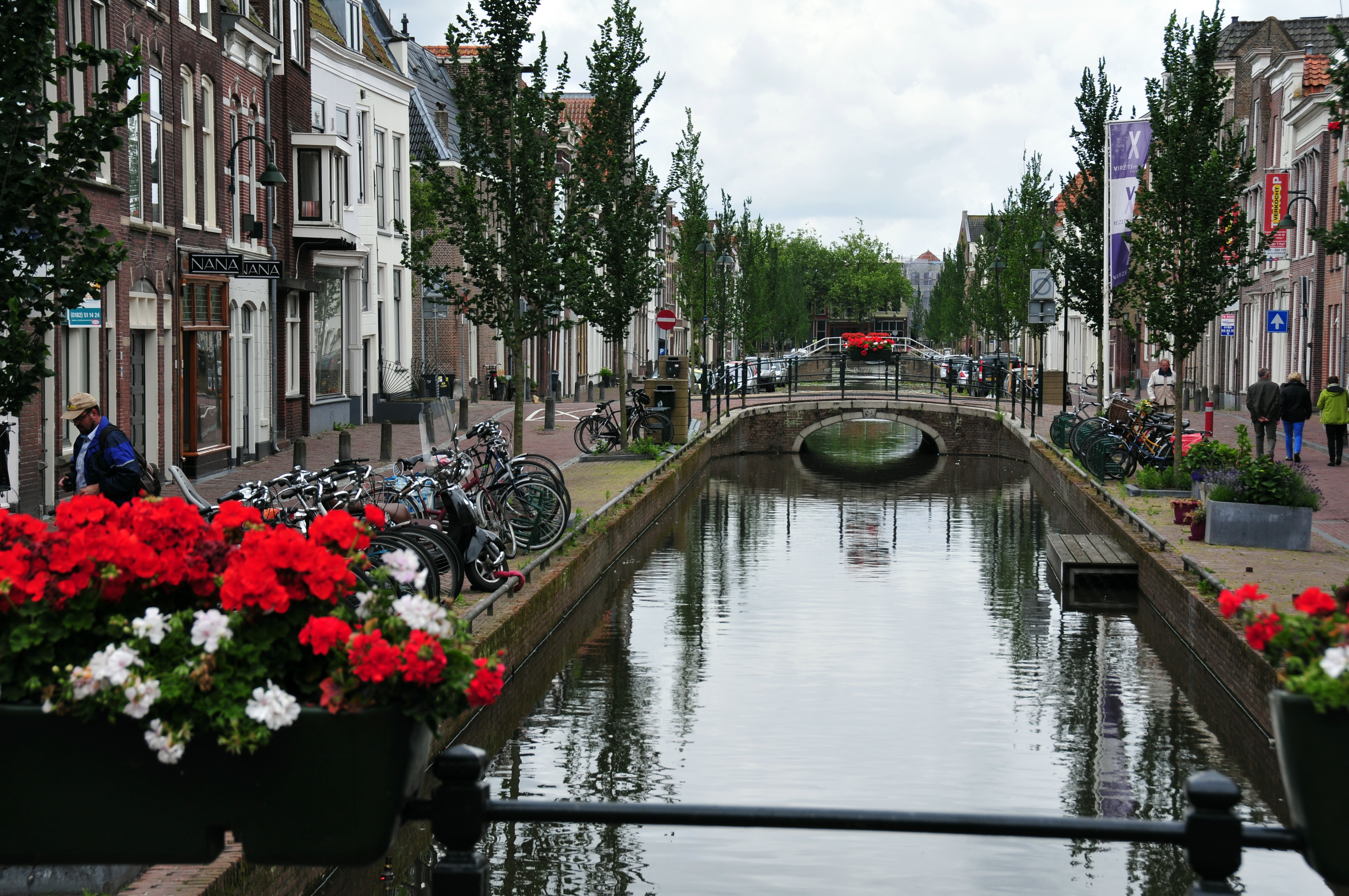
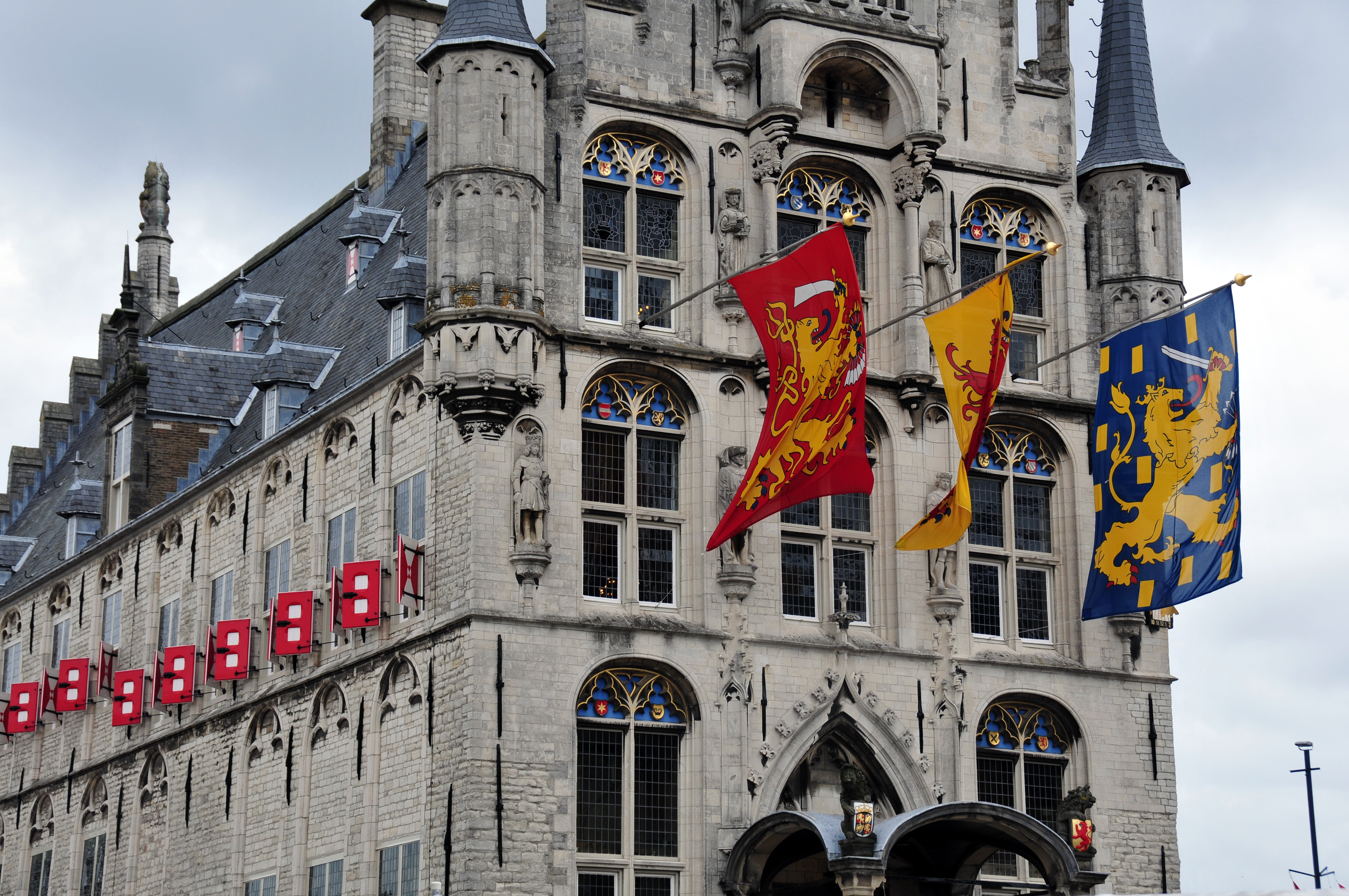
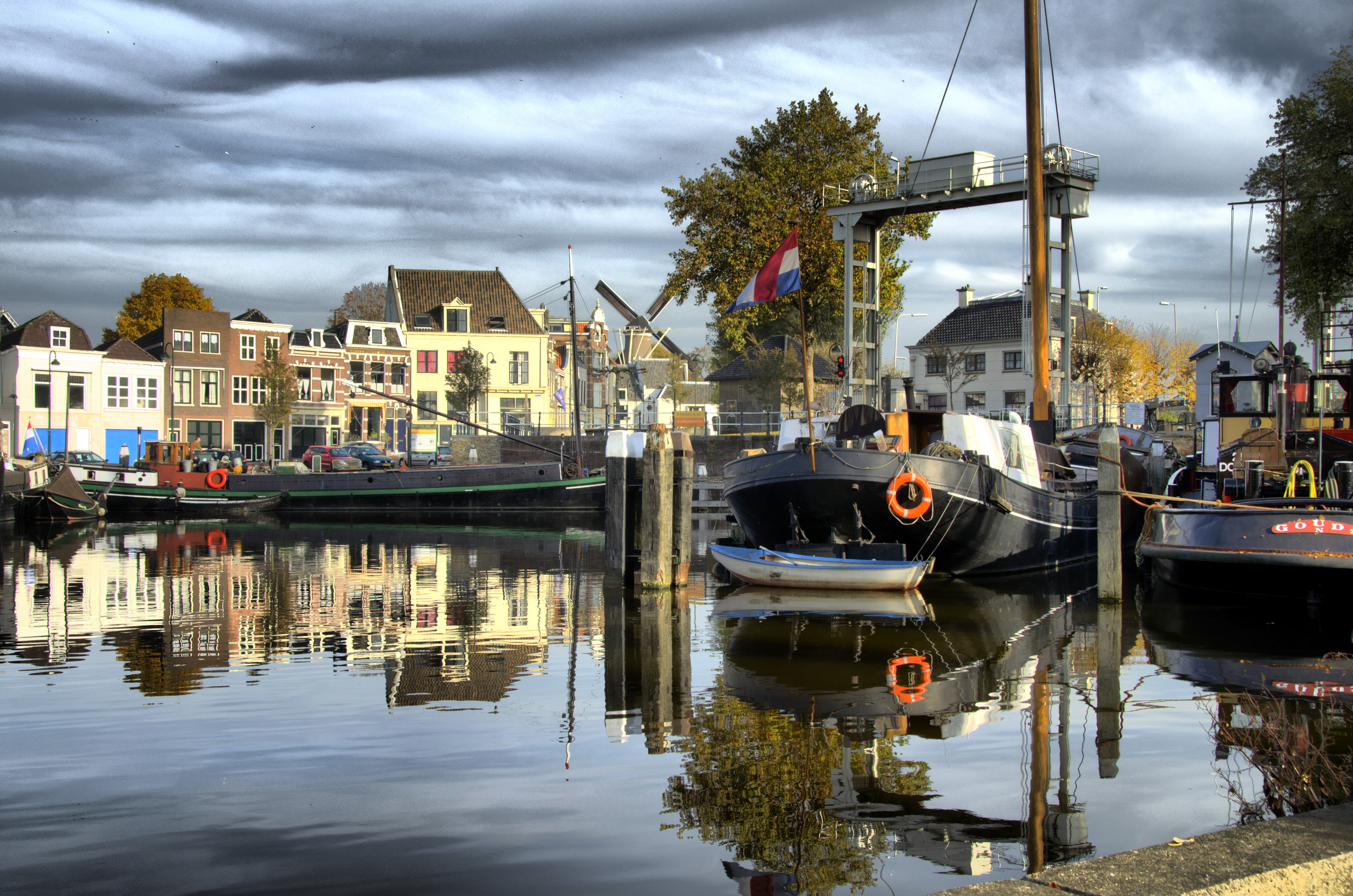
- Panoramic view of the city City centre Historic town hall Port

- Flag Coat of arms

- Location in South Holland

- Location within the Netherlands Location within Europe
- Coordinates: 52°0′40″N 4°42′40″E
- Country: Netherlands
- Province: South Holland

Government
  - Body: Municipal council
  - Mayor: Pieter Verhoeve (SGP)

Area
  - Total: 18.11 km^{2} (6.99 sq mi)
  - Land: 16.50 km^{2} (6.37 sq mi)
  - Water: 1.61 km^{2} (0.62 sq mi)
- Elevation: 0 m (0 ft)

Population (January 2021)
  - Total: 73,681
  - Density: 4,466/km^{2} (11,570/sq mi)
- Demonym: Gouwenaar
- Time zone: UTC+1 (CET)
  - Summer (DST): UTC+2 (CEST)
- Postcode: 2800–2809
- Area code: 0182
- Website: gouda.nl

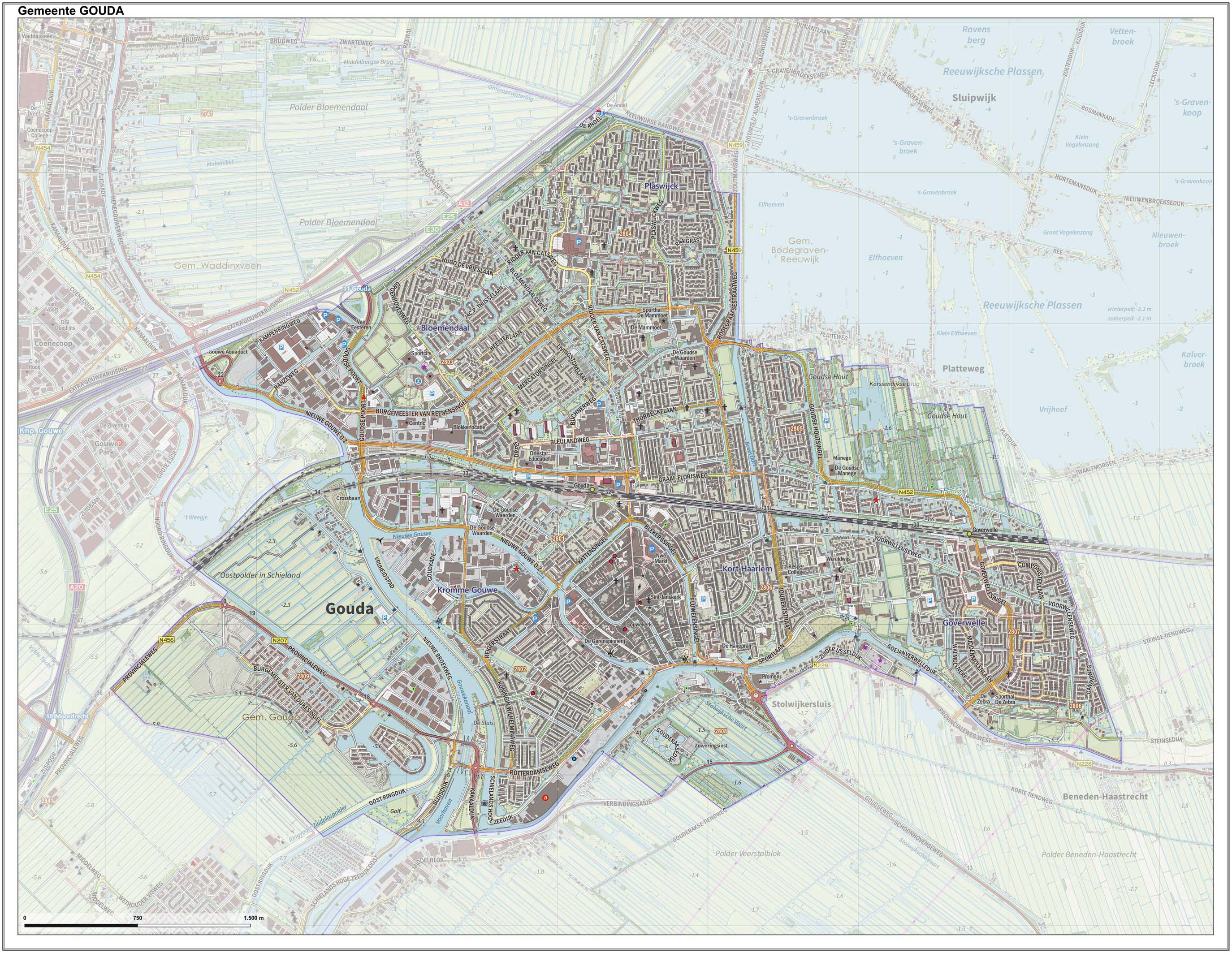
Topographic map of Gouda

Gouda (Dutch pronunciation: [ˈɣʌudaː]) is a city and municipality in the west of the Netherlands, between Rotterdam and Utrecht, in the province of South Holland. Gouda has a population of 75,000 and is famous for its Gouda cheese, stroopwafels, many grachten, smoking pipes, and its 15th-century city hall. Its array of historic churches and other buildings makes it a very popular day-trip destination.

In the Middle Ages the Van der Goude family founded a settlement at the location of the current city and built a fortified castle alongside the banks of the Gouwe River, from which the family and the city took their names. Locals long called the settlement Ter Goude, or Tergou or Tergouw for short. The area, originally marshland, developed over the course of two centuries. By 1225, a canal was linked to the Gouwe and its estuary became a harbour. In 1272 Floris V, Count of Holland granted the city city rights.

== History ==
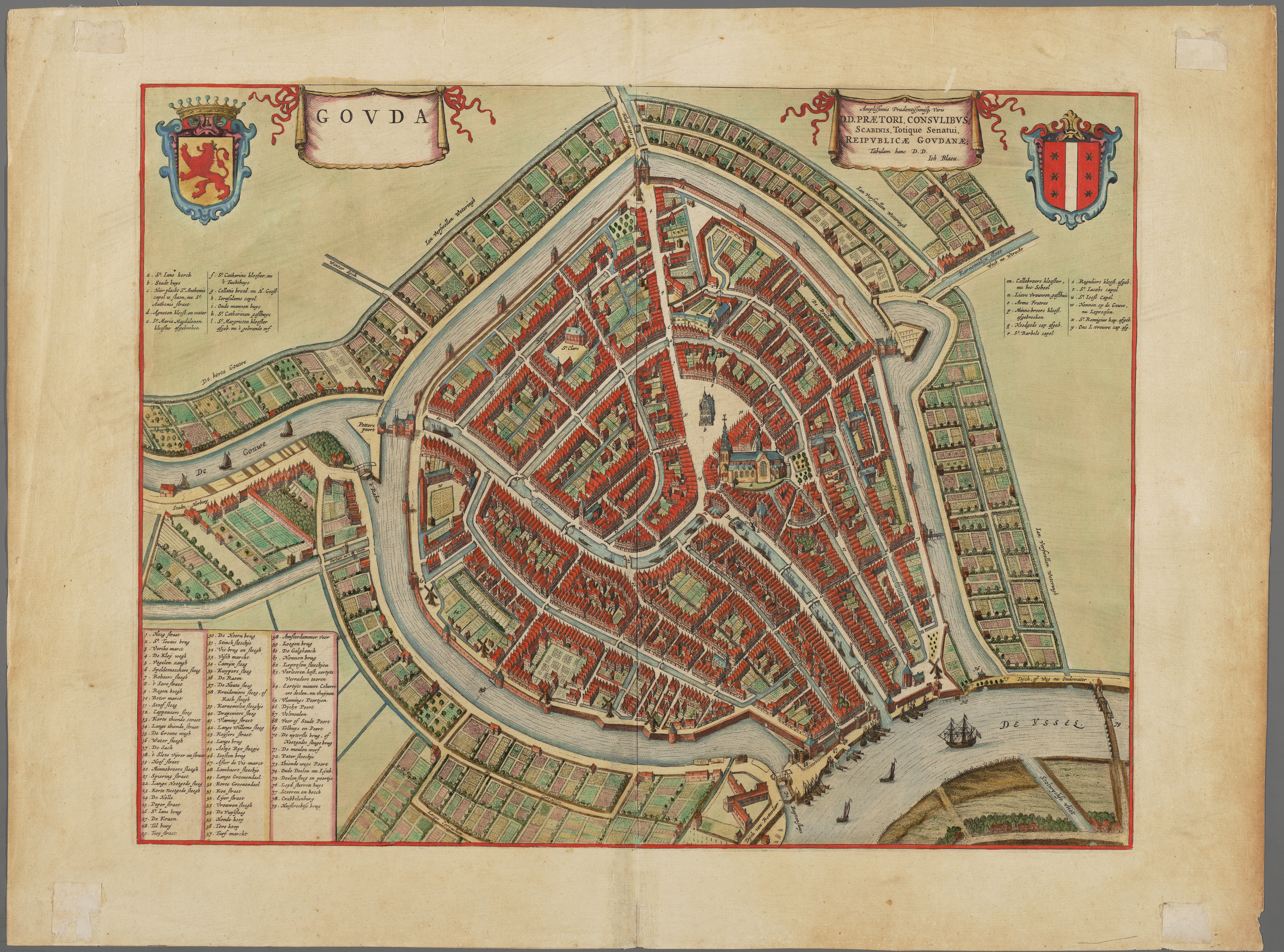
City centre of Gouda in 1650, by Joan Blaeu

Around the year 1100, the area of present-day Gouda was swampy and covered with a peat forest, crossed by small creeks such as the Gouwe. Along the shores of this stream near the current market and city hall, peat harvesting began in the 11th and 12th centuries. In 1139, the name Gouda was first mentioned in a document of the Bishop of Utrecht.

In the 13th century, the Gouwe was connected to the Oude Rijn (Old Rhine) by means of a canal and its mouth at the Hollandse IJssel was developed into a harbour. Castle Gouda was built to protect this harbour. This shipping route was used for trade between Flanders and France with Holland and the Baltic Sea. In 1272, Floris V, Count of Holland, granted city rights to Gouda, which by then had become an important location. City-canals (Dutch: grachten) were dug and served as transport ways through the town.

Great fires in 1361 and 1438 destroyed the city. In 1572, the city was occupied by les Gueux (Dutch rebels against the Spanish King) who also committed arson and destruction. In 1577 the demolition of Castle Gouda began.

1551 marked the founding of the oldest still-functioning inn, De Zalm, located on Markt 34, near the historic Waag building.

In 1574, 1625, 1636, and 1673, Gouda suffered from deadly plague epidemics, of which the last one was the most severe: 2995 persons died, constituting 20% of its population.

In the last quarter of the 16th century, Gouda had serious economic problems. It recovered in the first half of the 17th century and even prospered between 1665 and 1672. However, its economy collapsed again when the Franco-Dutch War broke out in 1672 and the plague decimated the city in 1673, even affecting the pipe industry. After 1700, Gouda enjoyed a period of progress and prosperity until 1730. Then another recession followed, resulting in a long period of decline that lasted well into the 19th century. Gouda was one of the poorest cities in the Netherlands during that period: the terms "Goudaner" and "beggar" were considered synonymous.

Starting in 1830, demolition of the city walls began. The last city gate was torn down in 1854. Only from the second half of the 19th century onward did Gouda start to profit from improved economic conditions. New companies, such as Stearine Kaarsenfabriek (Stearine Candle Factory) and Machinale Garenspinnerij (Mechanized Yarn Spinnery), gave impetus to its economy. In 1855, the Gouda-Utrecht railway began operations. At the beginning of the 20th century, large-scale development began, extending the city beyond its moats. First the new neighbourhoods Korte Akkeren, Kort Haarlem and Kadebuurt were built, followed by Oosterwei, Bloemendaal, Goverwelle and Westergouwe after World War II.

From 1940 on, back-filling of the city moats and city-canals, the grachten, began: the Nieuwehaven, Raam, Naaierstraat, and Achter de Vismarkt. However, because of protests from city dwellers and revised policies of city planners, Gouda did not continue back-filling moats and city-canals, now considered historically valuable. In 1944, the railway station was damaged during an Allied bombardment which killed eight and wounded ten persons. This bombardment was intended to destroy the railroad connecting The Hague and Rotterdam to Utrecht.

After the war, the city started to expand and nearly tripled in size. New neighbourhoods, such as Gouda-Oost, Bloemendaal and Goverwelle were built. By the early 2020s, there had been a shift from expanding the city towards urban renewal and gentrification.

== Demographics ==
Historical population

Year	Pop.	±% p.a.
1382	4,500	—
1398	5,000	+0.66%
1477	12,600	+1.18%
1494	7,200	−3.24%
1514	7,623	+0.29%
1560	9,000	+0.36%

Year	Pop.	±% p.a.
1622	14,627	+0.79%
1632	13,300	−0.95%
1665	15,000	+0.37%
1732	20,000	+0.43%
1795	11,715	−0.85%

Source: Lourens & Lucassen 1997, pp. 107–108

== Economy ==
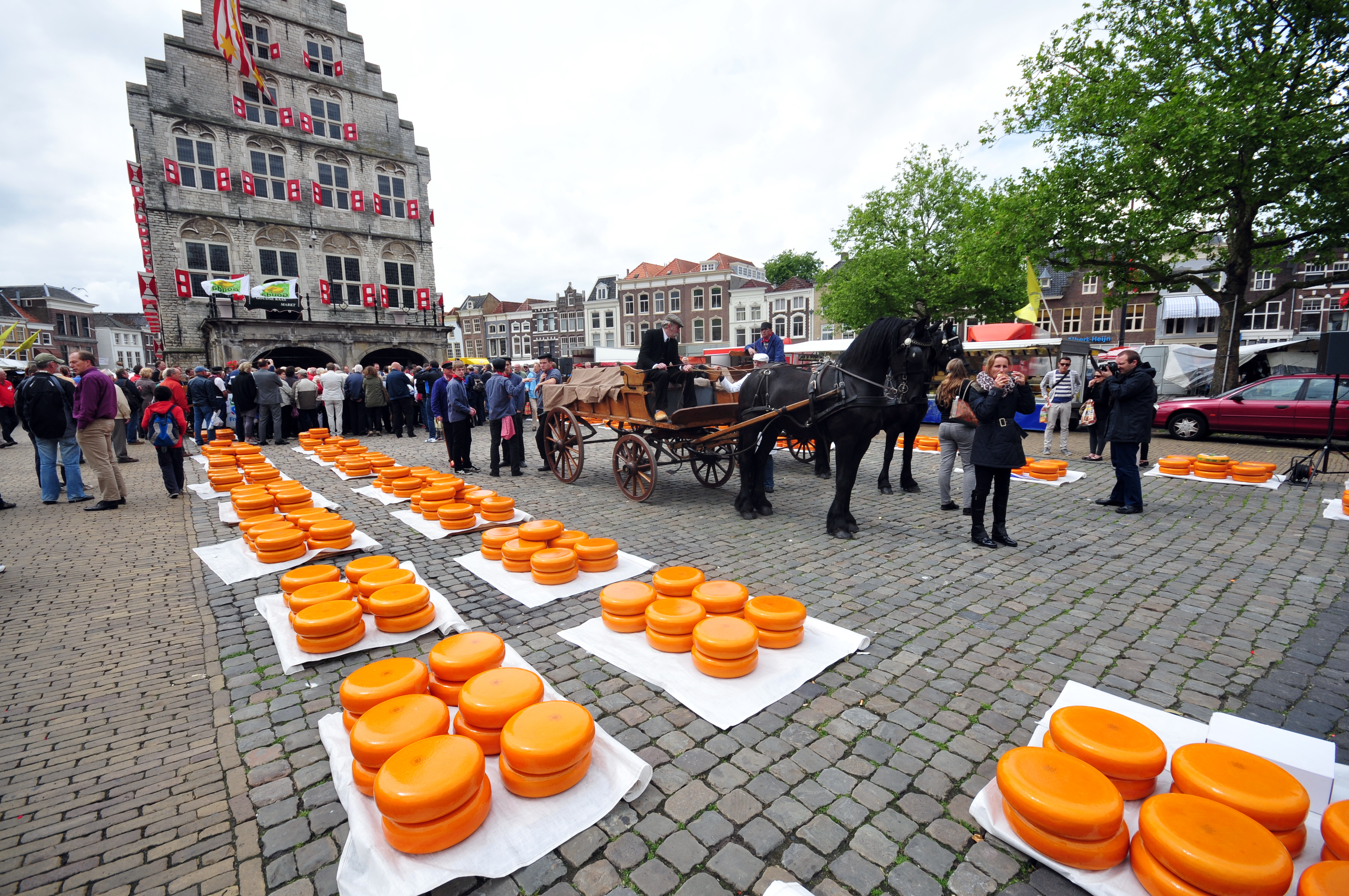
Gouda's Cheese Market

Gouda is known for its Gouda cheese, which is still traded on its cheese market, held each Thursday. Gouda is also known for the fabrication of candles, smoking pipes, and stroopwafels. Gouda used to have a considerable linen industry and several beer breweries.

Gouda cheese is not made in the city itself, but rather in the surrounding region. It derives its name from being traded in Gouda where the city council imposes stringent quality controls.

The economy of the city centre is based on tourism, leisure and retail, while offices are located at the outskirts of the city. Currently, there are over 32,000 jobs in the city, mainly in commercial and healthcare services.

== Attractions ==
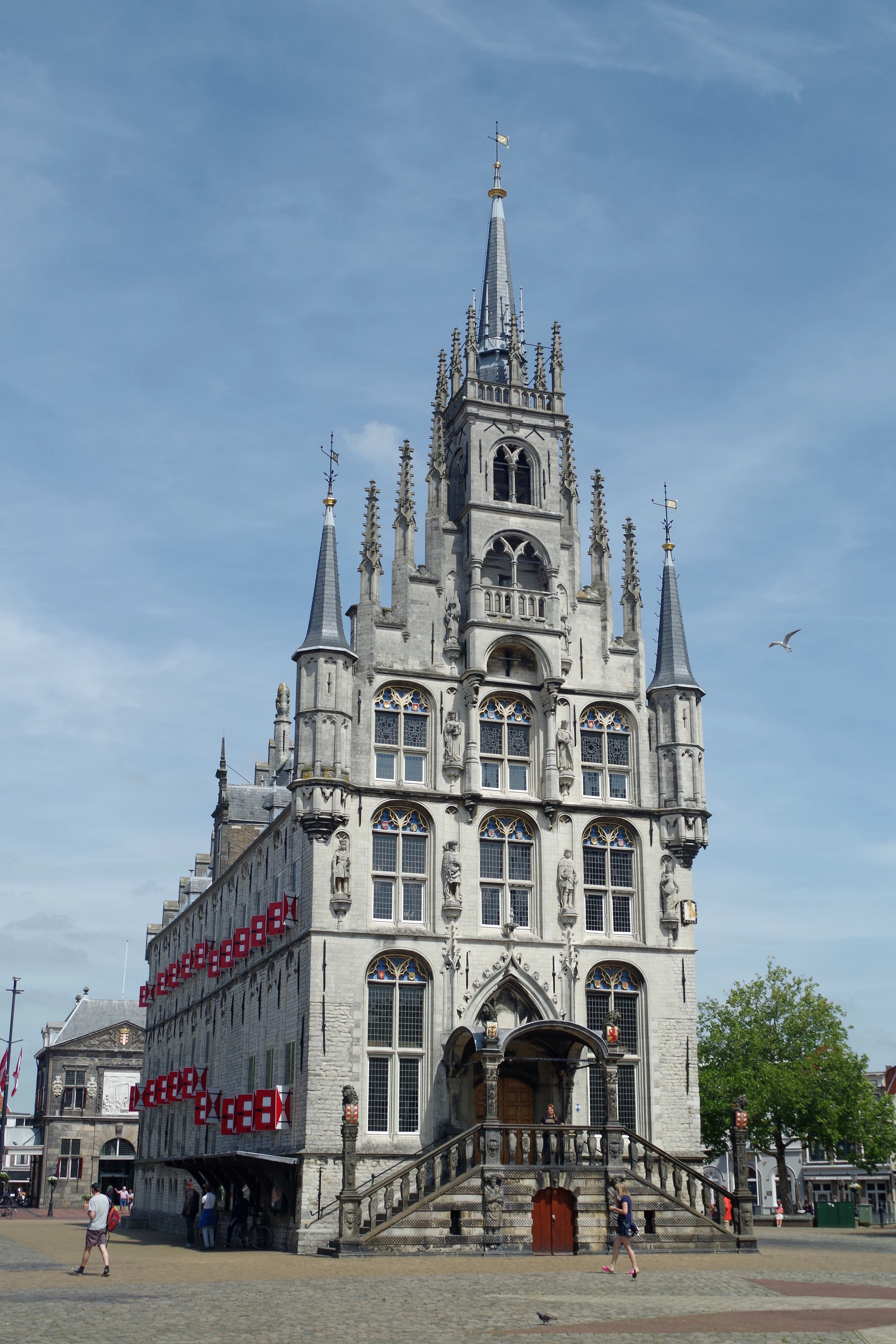
Gouda's 15th-century town hall (formerly moated)

- Old City Hall at the Markt square - built between 1448 and 1450, one of the oldest Gothic city halls in the Netherlands;
- The Waag (weigh house) - built in 1667 across from the Old City Hall, this building was used for weighing goods (especially cheese) to levy taxes. It now is a national monument. It currently hosts a small cheese museum;
- Grote or St. Jans Kerk (Great or Saint John's Church) - longest church in the Netherlands, famous for its stained glass windows which were made between 1530 and 1603, considered the most significant stained glass collection in the Netherlands. Even in the 17th century, it already was a tourist attraction;
- Museum Gouda - museum about the history and arts of the city;
- Verzetsmuseum - a museum about the Dutch resistance during World War II, the collection currently in storage as museum building closed in November 2018;
- Museumhaven Gouda - small harbour with historic ships;
- Goudse Schouwburg - large theatre;
- Waaiersluis (Waaier Locks) - a historic lock on the Hollandse IJssel just east of Gouda.

== Events ==
- Gouda Cheese & Craft Market, every Thursday from 10:00 - 13:00h (April–August). According to Stichting Goudse Kaas, it attracted 60,000 tourists each year (as of 2017).
- Gouda Ceramics Days, a yearly two-day event of ceramists from the Netherlands and several other countries. Several exhibitions. May 29 10:00 - 17:00h and May 30 10:00 - 16:00h around the Old City Hall.
- Gouda's Monmartre, antique/curio/flea/collector's market, weekly on Wednesdays around the Old City Hall during summer from June 4 - Sept. 10, 2014.
- Gouda Water City Festival weekend of June 21, 2014
- Gouda by Candlelight - an annual Christmas event held in mid-December, featuring attractions in the city centre. In the evening, a Christmas tree, an annual gift from the sister city of Kongsberg, is lit in the market place. Carols are sung by famous Dutch singers accompanied by choirs. The windows of the Old City Hall and the surrounding houses are lit by Gouda candles.

=== Music ===
- Warmaster, old school death metal band

== Transport ==
Gouda is served by two railway stations, Gouda and Gouda Goverwelle. The main railway station is served by Intercity services to The Hague, Rotterdam, and Utrecht and local trains to Amsterdam and Alphen aan den Rijn.

The city also lies alongside the A12 and A20 motorways.

== Twin towns – sister cities ==
Gouda is twinned with:

- Kongsberg, Norway (since 1956)
- Solingen, Germany (since 1957)

Gouda was also twinned with Gloucester in England, but this twinning ended in 2015.

== Notable people ==
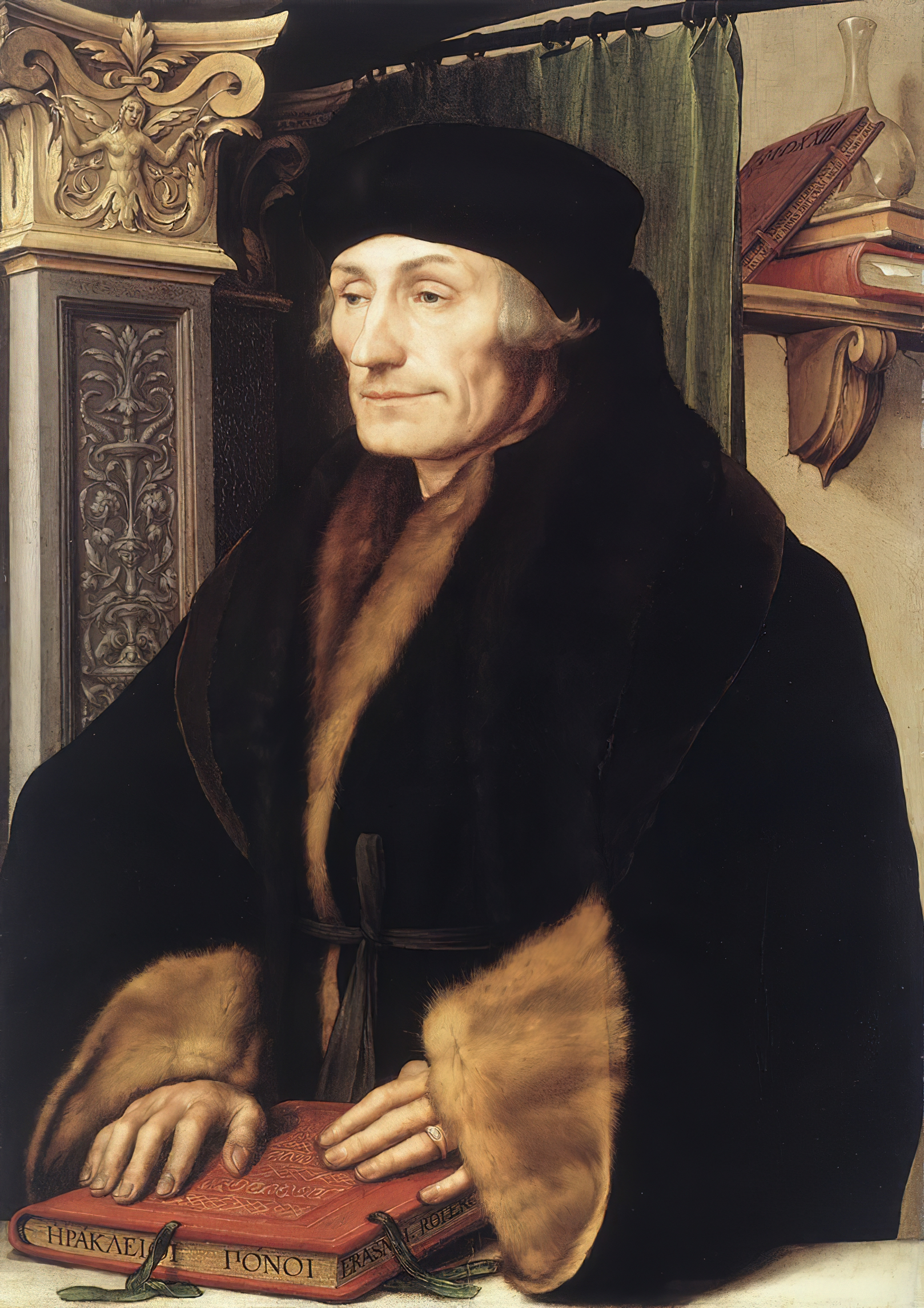
Portrait of Erasmus by Holbein, 1523

=== Public thinking and public service ===
- Gerard Leeu (1445–1493) was a Dutch printer of the incunabulum period
- Desiderius Erasmus (1466–1536) a Dutch philosopher and Christian humanist, scholar of the northern Renaissance
- Cornelius Loos (1546–1595) a Roman Catholic priest, theologian and professor of theology
- Cornelis (1565–1599) and Frederick (1571–1627) de Houtman were Dutch brother explorers on the first Dutch expedition to the East Indies
- Adriaen Maertensz Block (ca.1582-1661) commander and governor of Ambon 1614-1617,
- Hieronymus van Beverningh (1614–1690) a diplomat, amateur botanist and patron of the arts
- Roemer Vlacq (1637–1703) a Dutch naval captain, who blew up his ship to save it from capture
- Hieronymus van Alphen (1746–1803) a jurist and wrote poems for children
- Gerard Van Helden (1848–1901) Detective Superintendent in the Birmingham City Police Force
- Gerard van Leijenhorst (1928–2001) a politician and chemistry teacher in Gouda 1955 to 1971
- Wim Deetman (born 1945) a politician, teacher and municipal councillor in Gouda 1974 to 1981
- Jan Oosterhaven (born 1945) economist and university professor
- Hans van Leeuwen (born 1946) an educator, engineer, inventor, researcher and entrepreneur
- Ad Melkert (born 1956) a Dutch politician, diplomat and nonprofit director

=== Science and business ===
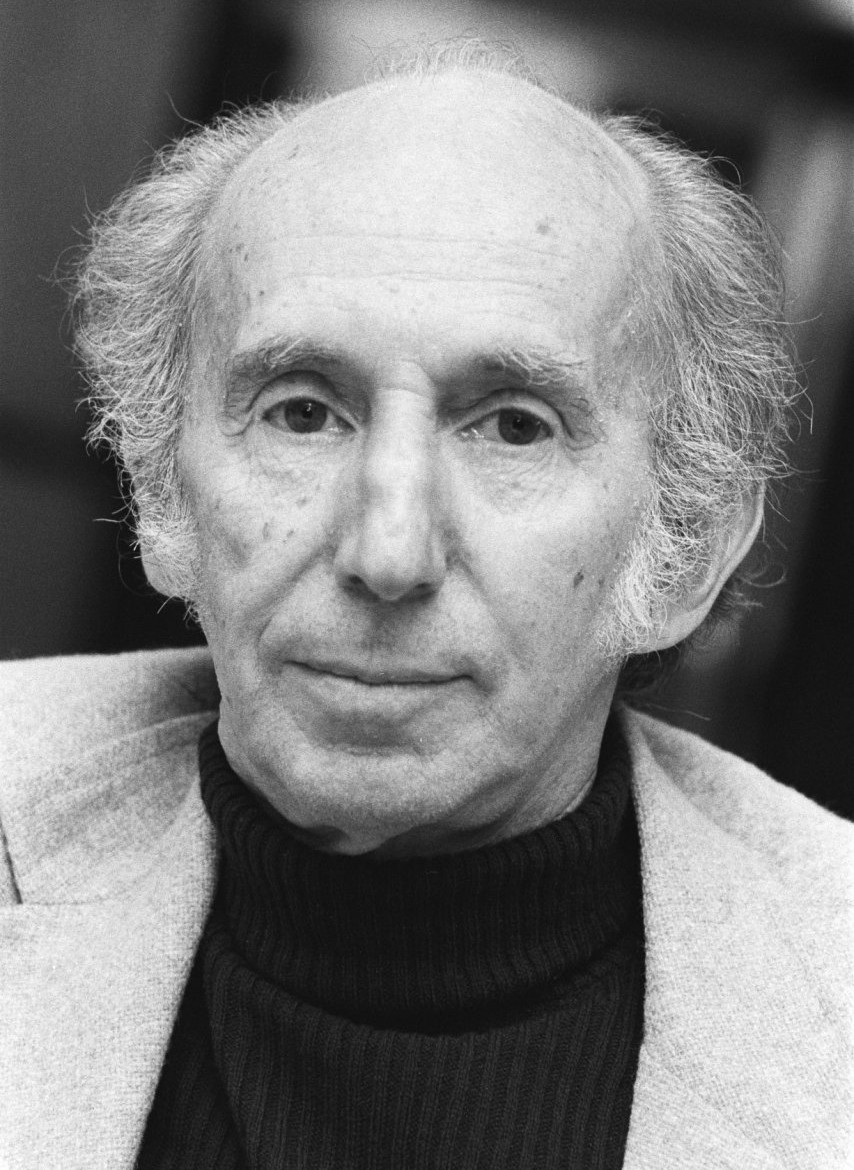
Leo Vroman, 1983

- Adriaan Vlacq (1600–1667) a Dutch author of mathematical tables and book publisher
- Nicolaas Hartsoeker (1656–1725) a mathematician and physicist, invented the screw-barrel microscope
- Gualtherus Johannes Cornelis Kolff (1826–1881) co-founder of G. Kolff & Co., a publishing company in Batavia, Dutch East Indies
- Pieter Johannes van Rhijn (1886—1960) a Dutch astronomer
- Jan Schilt (1894–1982) a Dutch-American astronomer, invented the Schilt photometer
- Jan Gonda (1905–1991) a Dutch Indologist and academic
- Leo Vroman (1915-2014) a Dutch-American hematologist, poet and illustrator
- Peter van Mensch (born 1947) a Dutch scientist in the field of museology
- Peter Stas (born 1963) a Dutch entrepreneur and author, CEO of Frédérique Constant

=== The arts ===
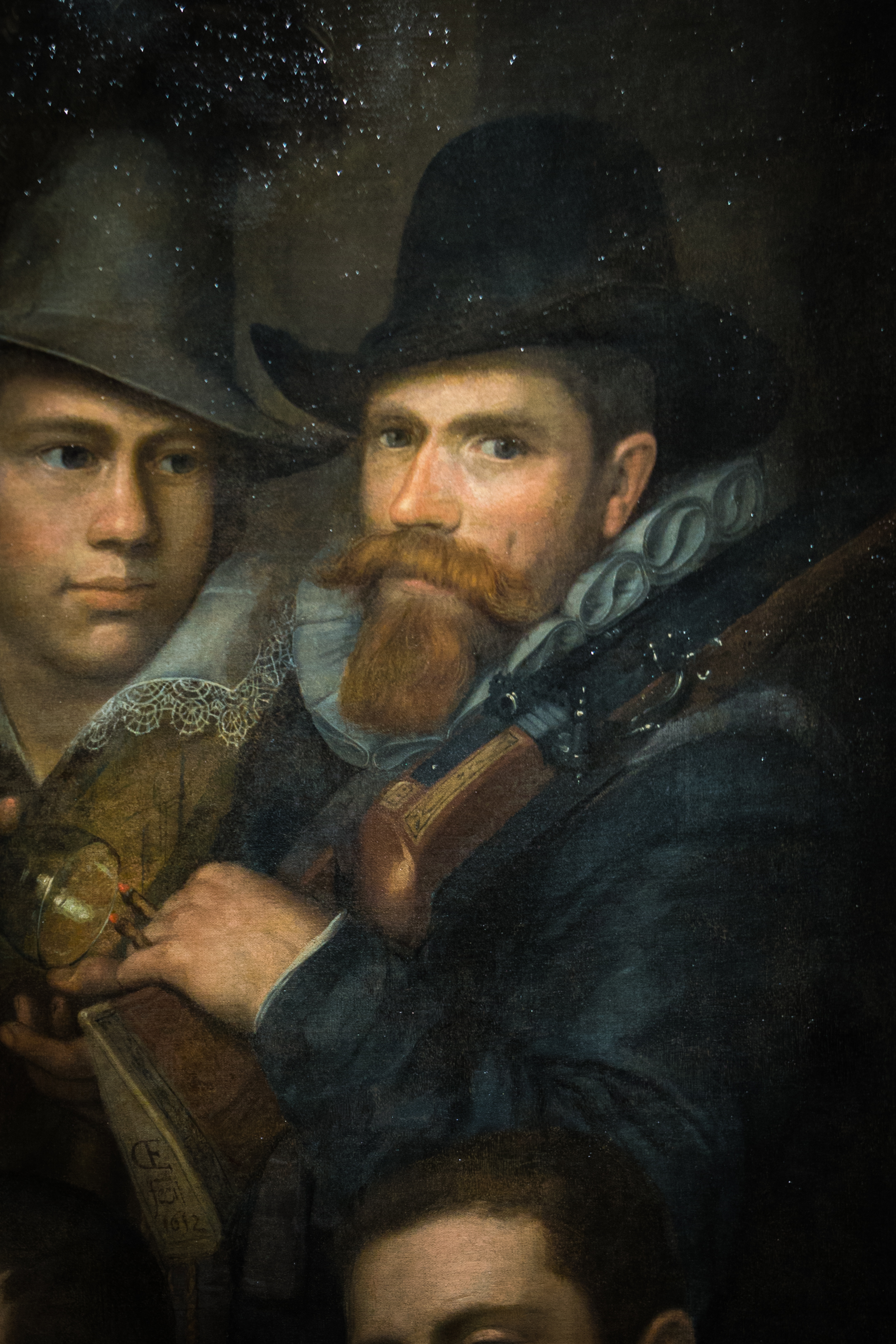
Cornelis Engelsz, self-portrait, 1612

- brothers Dirk Crabeth (1501—1574) & Wouter Crabeth I (1510-1590), Dutch Renaissance glass painters
- Pieter Pourbus (ca.1523–1584) a Flemish Renaissance painter of portraits and religious scenes
- Cornelis Ketel (1548–1616) a Dutch Mannerist painter
- Cornelis Engelsz (1575–1650) a Dutch Golden Age painter
- Jacob Block (1580–1646) a Dutch Golden Age painter
- Daniël Tomberg (1603–1678) a Dutch Golden Age glass painter
- Frederick de Wit (ca.1630–1706) a cartographer and artist, drew, printed and sold maps
- Hendrik Bary (ca.1632–1707) a Dutch engraver
- Pieter Donker (1635–1668) a Dutch Golden Age painter
- Jan Willem van Borselen (1825-1892) a Dutch landscape painter of the Hague School
- Cornelis Verwoerd (1913–2000) a Dutch Delftware painter, modeler, and ceramist
- Koos de Bruin (1941-1992) a Dutch painter, draftsman, sculptor and graphic artist
- Rozalie Hirs (born 1965) a Dutch composer of contemporary classical music and a poet
- Marco de Goeij (born 1967), composer, reconstructed Concerto for Group and Orchestra by Jon Lord
- Léon de Jong (born 1982) a Dutch politician and singer, a former musician and salesman

=== Sport ===
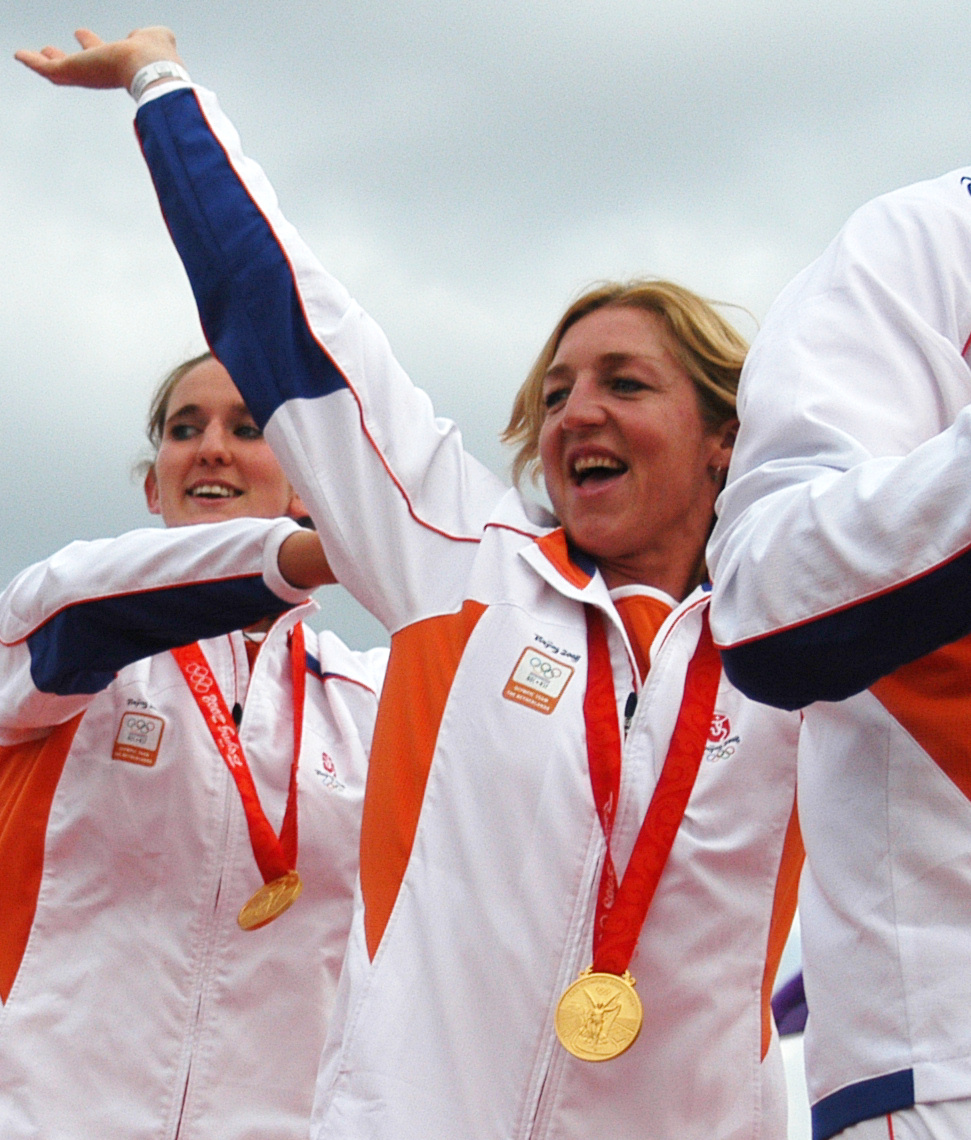
Gillian van den Berg, 2008

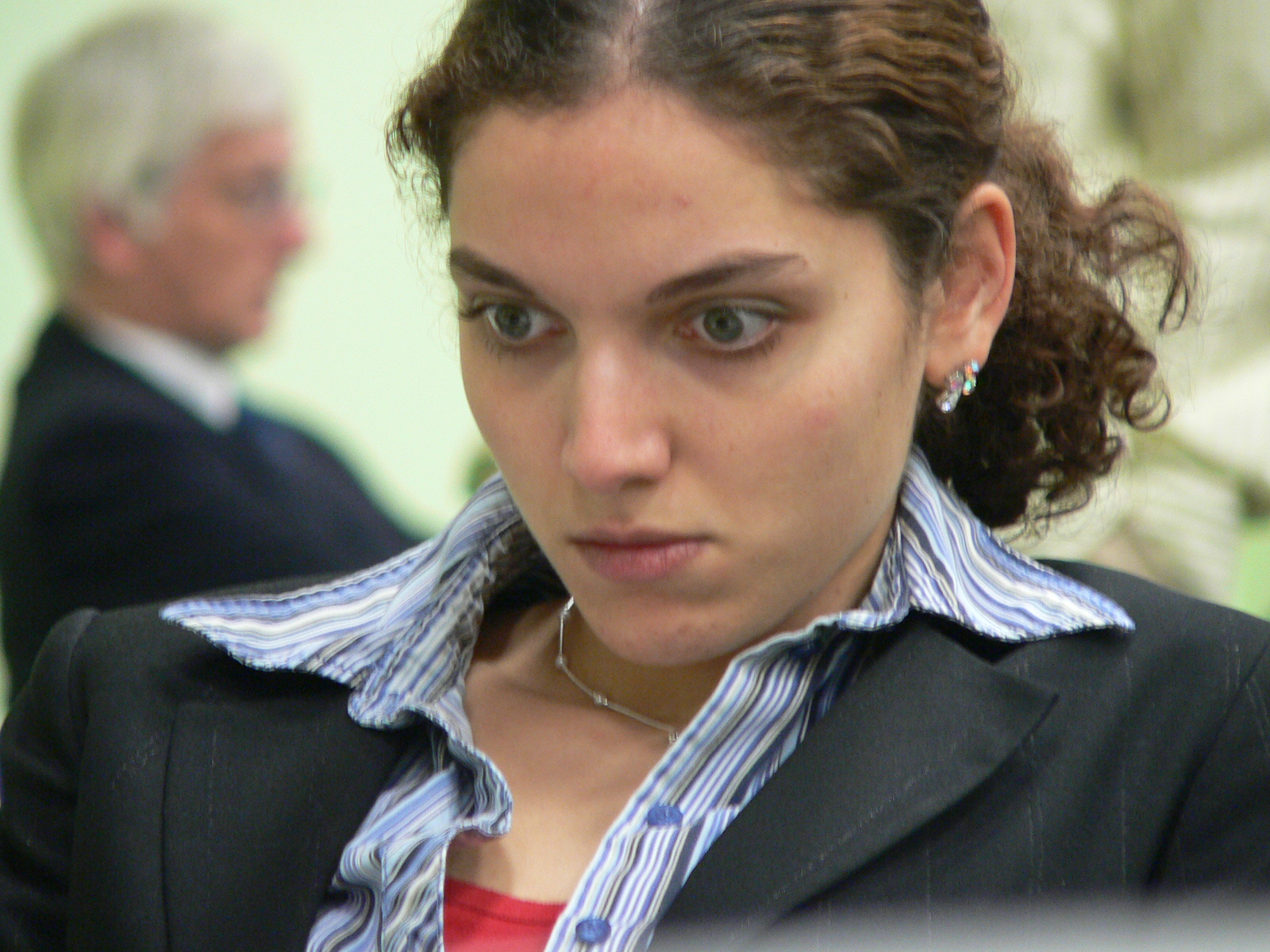
Bianca de Jong-Muhren, 2005

- Dick van Dijk (1946–1997) football player with 250 club caps
- Harry van der Laan (born 1964) a retired Dutch football striker with over 350 club caps
- Ed de Goey (born 1966) former goalkeeper with 569 club caps, 31 caps with Netherlands national football team
- Marcel van Vliet (born 1970) a Dutch truck racer
- Gillian van den Berg (born 1971) a water polo player, team gold medallist at the 2008 Summer Olympics
- Andrea Nuyt (born 1974) a retired speed skater, competed at the 1998 and 2002 Winter Olympics
- Ellen Hogerwerf (born 1989) a rower and team silver medallist at the 2020 Summer Olympics
- Froukje Wegman (born 1979) a rower and team bronze medallist at the 2004 Summer Olympics
- Michel Breuer (born 1980) a retired Dutch footballer with 519 club caps
- Paulien van Deutekom (1981-2019) a Dutch champion speed skater, competed at the 2006 Winter Olympics
- Bianca de Jong-Muhren (born 1986) a Dutch chess Woman Grandmaster (WGM)
- Mieke Cabout (born 1986) a water polo player, team gold medallist at the 2008 Summer Olympics
- Ted-Jan Bloemen (born 1986) a Dutch-Canadian long track speed skater, gold and silver medallist at the 2018 Winter Olympics
- Lex van Haeften (born 1987) a Dutch professional footballer
- Michael van der Mark (born 1992) a Dutch motorcycle racer
- Christiaan Messemaker (1821–1905) a Dutch chess master

== Gallery ==
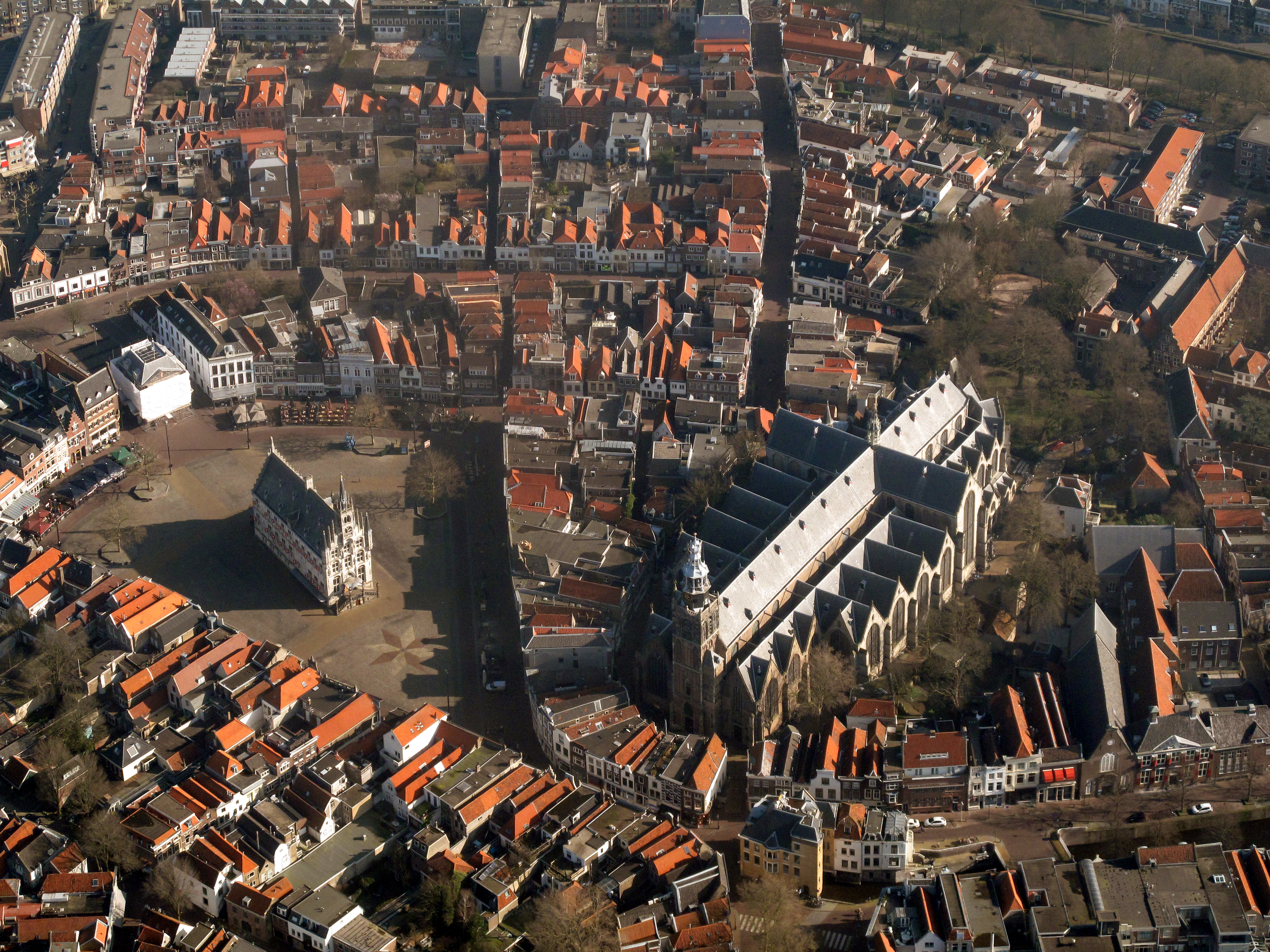
Town center from the sky with townhall and church (de Grote of Sint Janskerk)

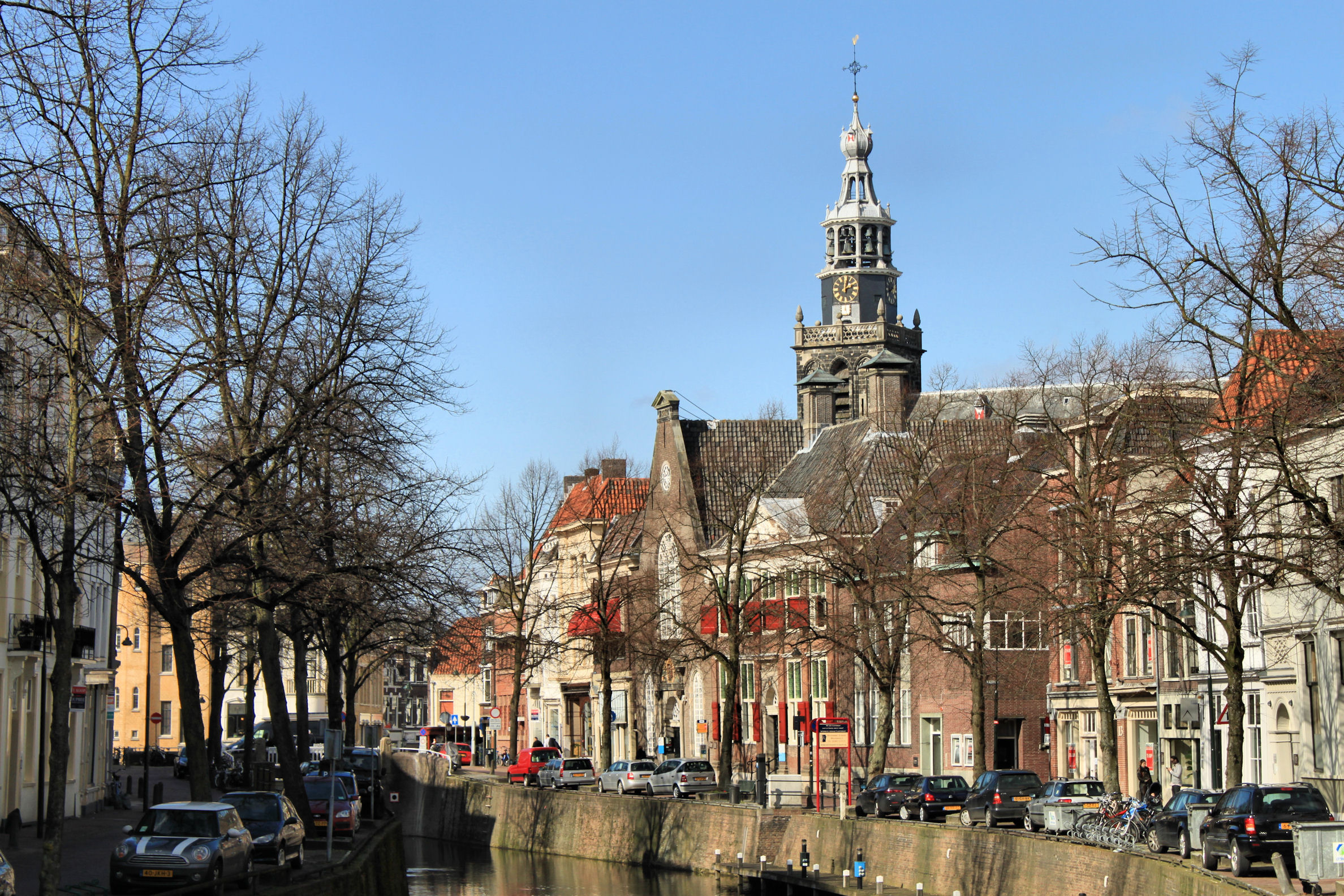
Gracht in Gouda

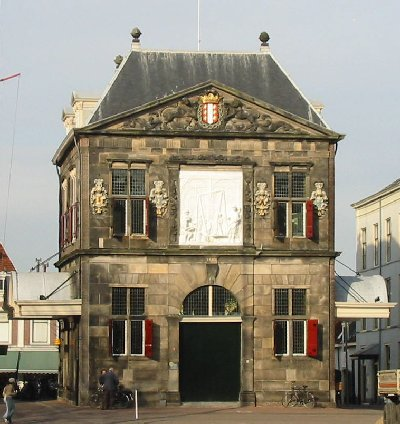
The Waag (weigh house)

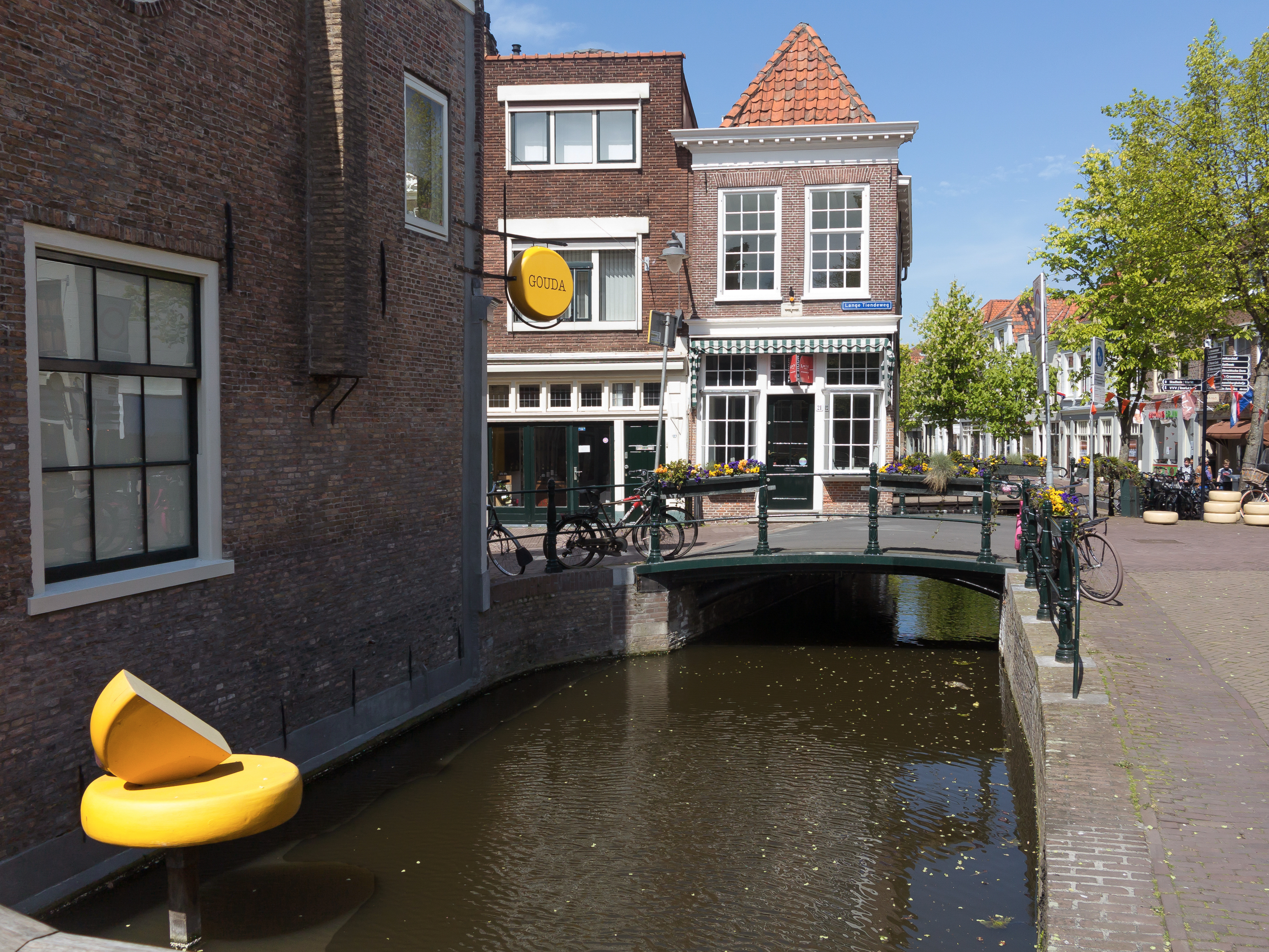
Street view at the Lange Tiendeweg with the cheese shop ('t Kaaswinkeltje) and 't Grendeltje

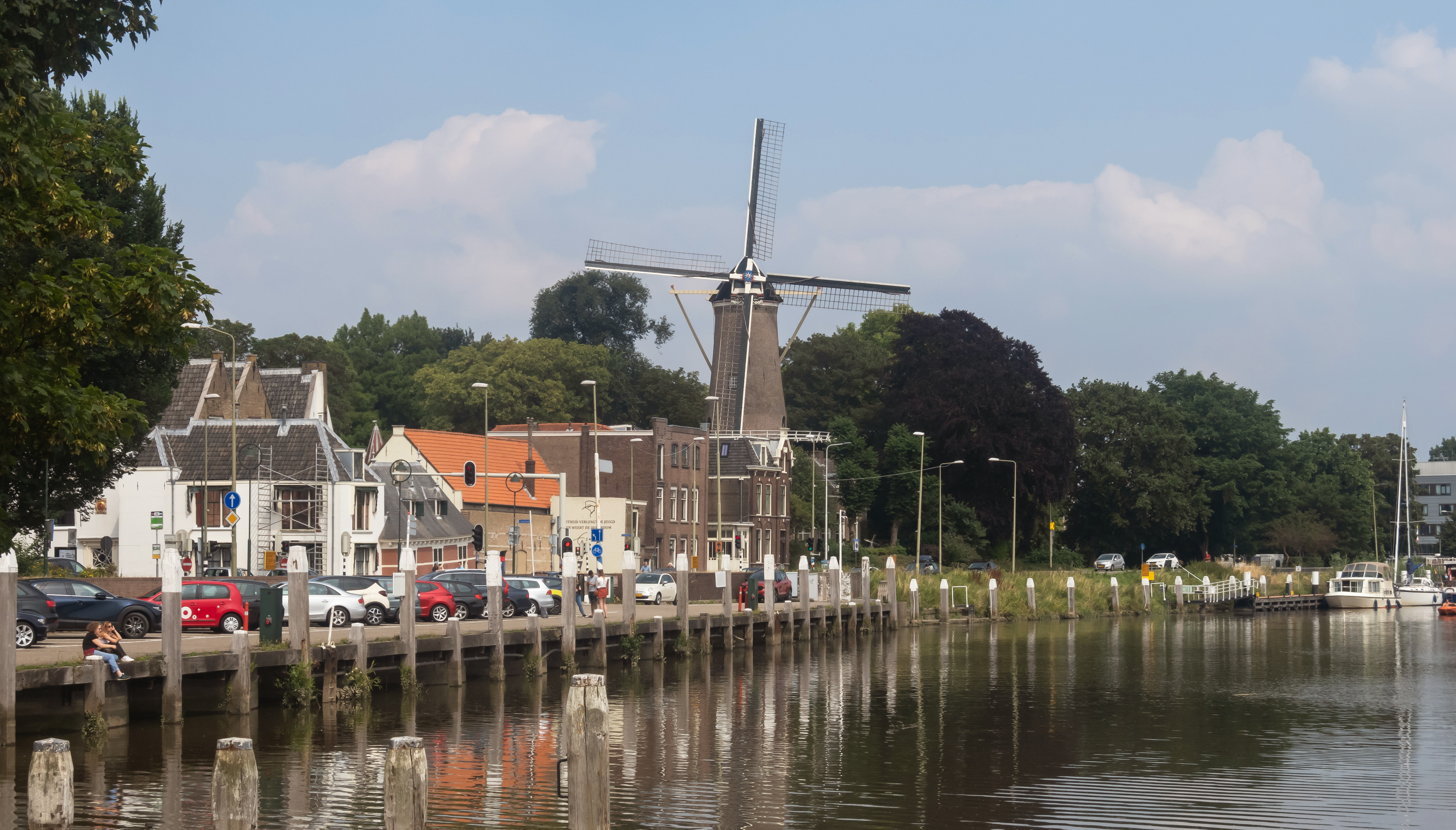
Windmill: molen 't Slot
