= Van Haeften =

Van Haeften is a surname. Notable people with the surname include:

- Benedictus van Haeften (1588–1648), provost of Affligem Abbey and writer of religious works
- Johnny Van Haeften (born 1952), British art dealer
- Lex van Haeften (born 1987), Dutch footballer
