= War Gods =

War Gods may refer to:

- War Gods (video game), a 1996 video game for video arcades and for the Nintendo 64, PlayStation and Windows
- War-Gods of the Deep, a 1965 film also known as City Under the Sea
- War Gods of Babylon, a 1962 Italian film

== See also ==
- Gods of War (disambiguation)
- List of war deities of ancient mythology
