= Jan Oosterhaven =

Jan Oosterhaven (born 19 June 1945, in Gouda) is a Dutch economist, who currently is Professor of Spatial Economics at the University of Groningen. Before that, he held positions as associate and assistant professor at the same university since 1970. Between 1985 and 1986, he was a visiting professor at the University of California, Los Angeles, teaching urban economics, and between 1998 and 1999 was as a senior consultant for TNO.

Oosterhaven completed his MA in Econometrics at the Erasmus University Rotterdam in 1969, and obtained a PhD on "Interregional Input-Output Analysis and Dutch Regional Policy Problems" from the University of Groningen in 1981 (published with Gower).

His research focuses on interregional input-output analysis, demo-economic modeling, indirect economic effects of transport infrastructure, and integral cost-benefit analysis of all kind of spatial policy measures. Besides about 60 research reports mostly for government agencies, he has written and edited 10 books and some 130 scientific articles on a wide range of subjects, such as sectoral, regional and urban policy, housing, impacts of social security, high-speed rail, road infrastructure, tourism and agricultural projects. These articles have been published in Annals of Reg.Sc., Env. & Pl. A, Econ. Syst. Res., ESB, Geografie, Geo. Analysis, Int. Reg.Sc. Rev., J.of Geo.Syst., J.of Reg.Sc., Kwartaalschr. Econ., Openb. Fin., Papers in Reg.Sc., Reg. Studies, Reg.Sc. & Urb. Econ., Southern Econ. J., Tijdschr. Vervoersw. and Transportation.

He is a Fellow of the Regional Science Association International, President of the International Input-Output Association (IIOA), Member of the scientific board of the Institut für Wirtschaftsforschung Halle (IWH), Editorial board member of the Australazian Journal of Reg. Studies, Brazilian Review of Reg. Studies, Kwartaalschrift Economie, Papers in Reg. Science, Tijdschrift Vervoerswetenschappen, and Economic Systems Research (of which he was the managing editor for five years).
