= Gualtherus Johannes Cornelis Kolff =

Dutch publisher and journalist (1826–1881)

G.J.C. Kolff
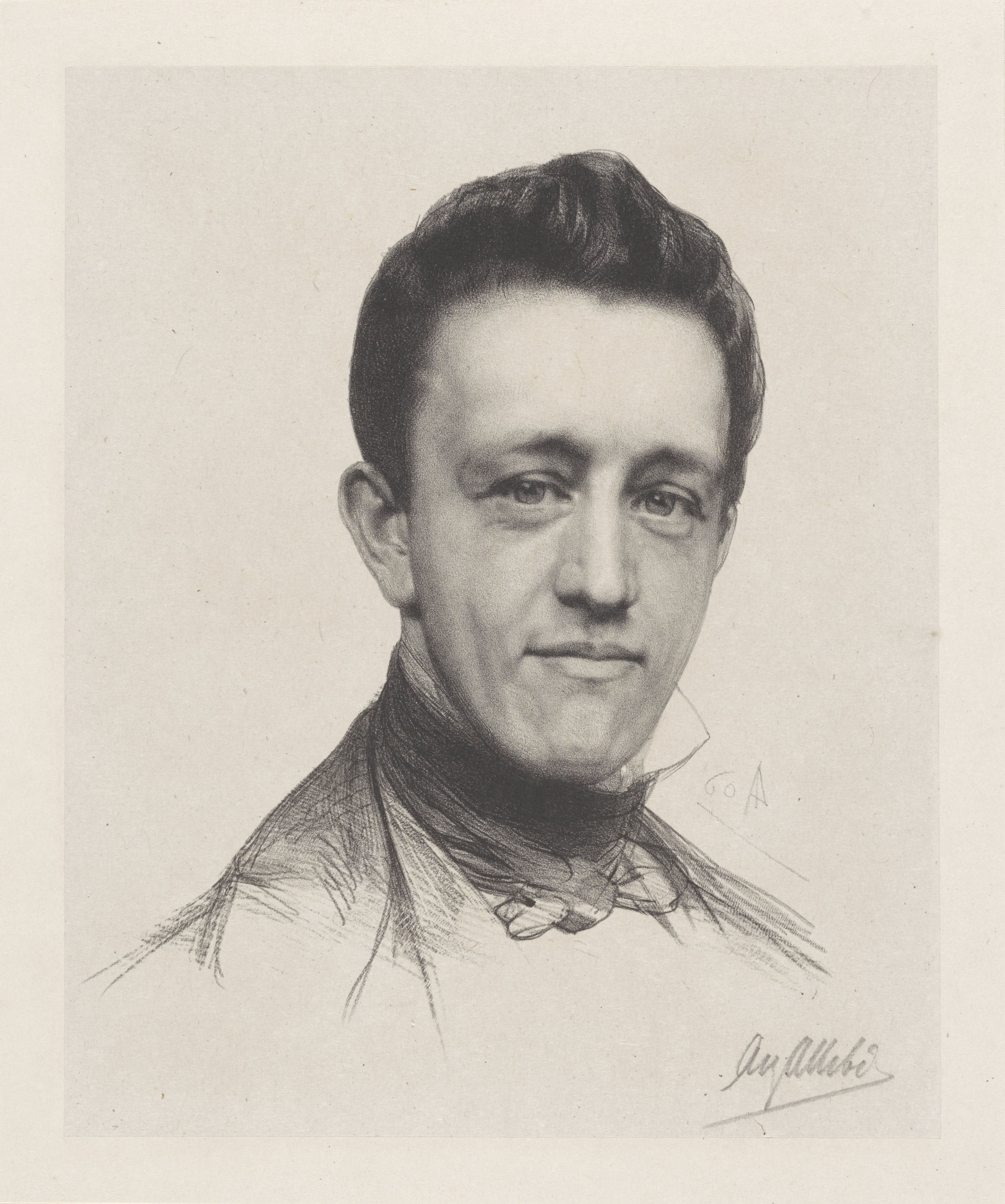
- Born: 8 November 1826; Gouda, South Holland, Netherlands
- Died: 29 April 1886 (Age 59); Leiden, South Holland, Netherlands
- Occupation: Co-founder of G. Kolff & Co.

Gualtherus Johannes Cornelis Kolff (8 November 1826 – 29 April 1881) was the co-founder of G. Kolff & Co., a publishing company in Batavia, Dutch East Indies of the Bataviaasch Nieuwsblad newspaper. Kolff was born in Gouda. His company also operated book shops. In the years after Indonesia became independent, the company moved to the Netherlands, and is now based mostly in Amsterdam and Leeuwarden. Kolff died in Leiden.

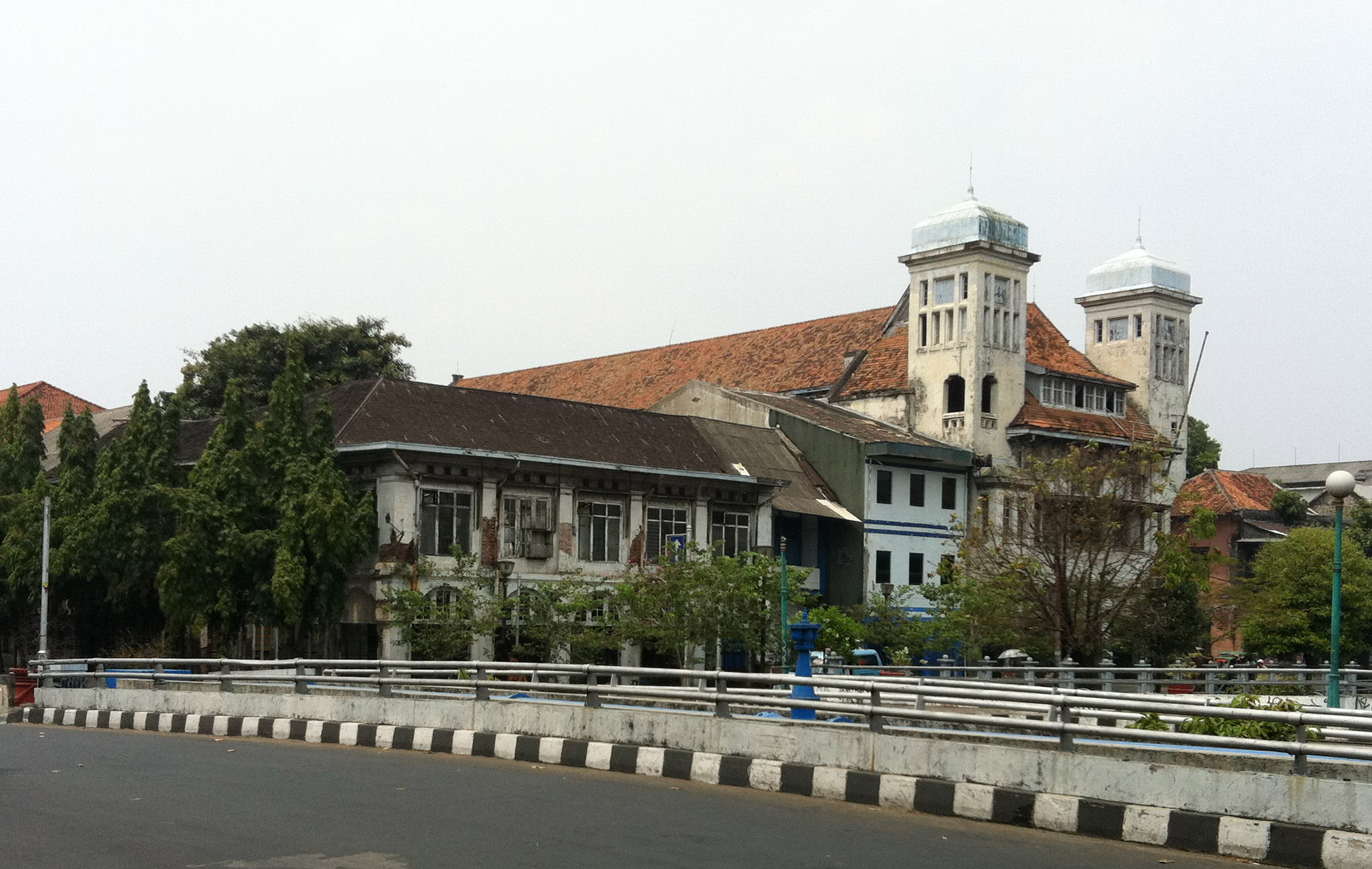
The abandoned G.J. Kolff & Co Bookstore (left) and Tjipta Niaga office (Internatio Building) of the Indonesia Trading Company (right)
