= Gracht =

Dutch waterway in the city with streets on both sides of the water

Gracht (Dutch pronunciation: [ɣrɑxt]; plural: grachten) is a Dutch word for a canal within a city. Often, Grachten encircle city centres in the Netherlands, Belgium, and Northern Germany. Outside the Netherlands, the word grachten mostly refers to the city canals of Amsterdam (for which it is well known) and also Utrecht, Leiden and The Hague. The Koninginnegracht in The Hague was conceived by King Willem I for the promotion of tourism in the early 19th century. Since 2009 the Willemsvaart once more offers tours over this gracht, to Scheveningen, known as "StrandRelax" or "BeachRelax", a unique stretch of sand between The Hague and the sea.

== Translation ==
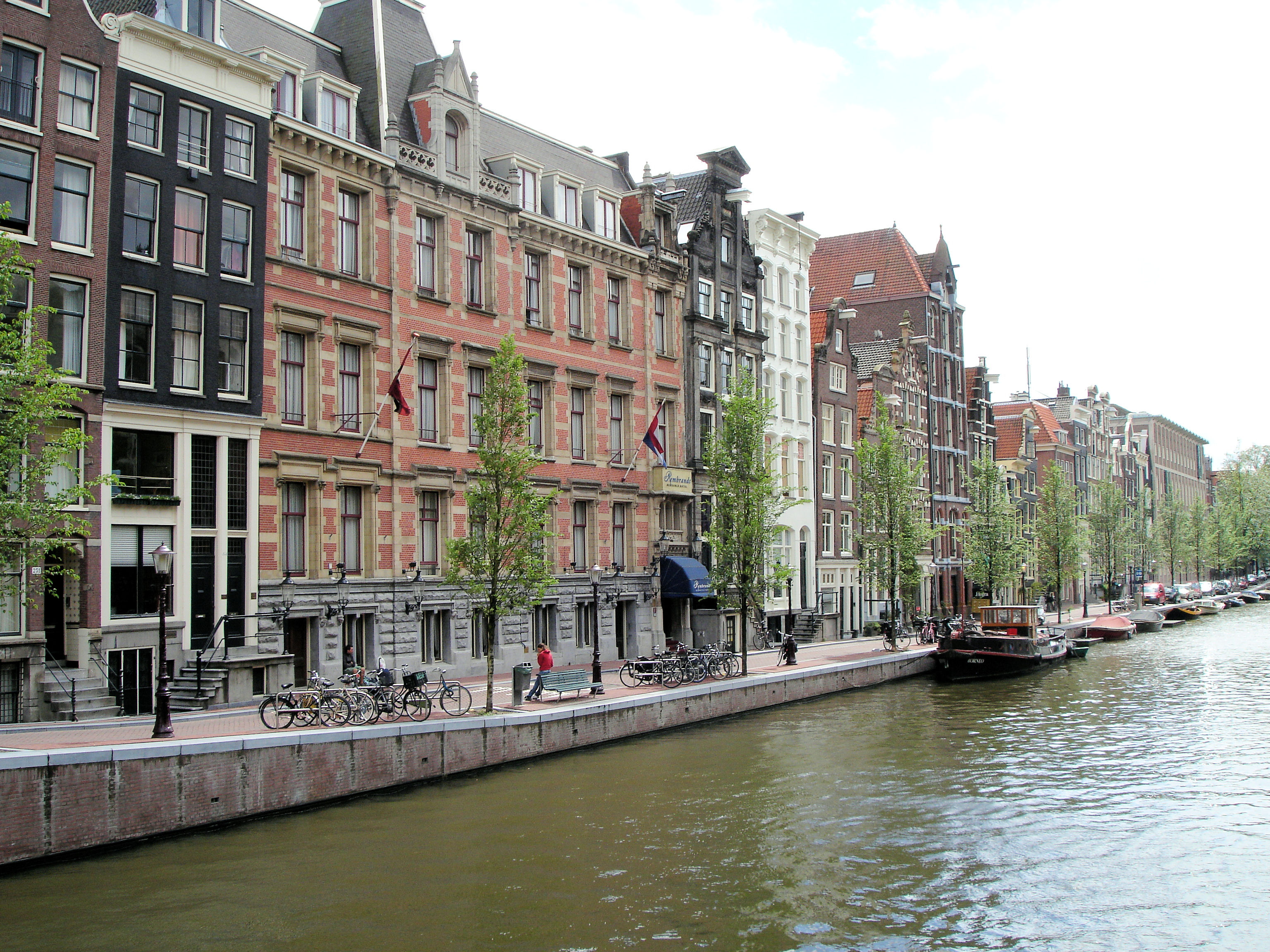
Amsterdam, the Netherlands' capital, is known for its UNESCO-listed Grachtengordel (literally: grachten belt).

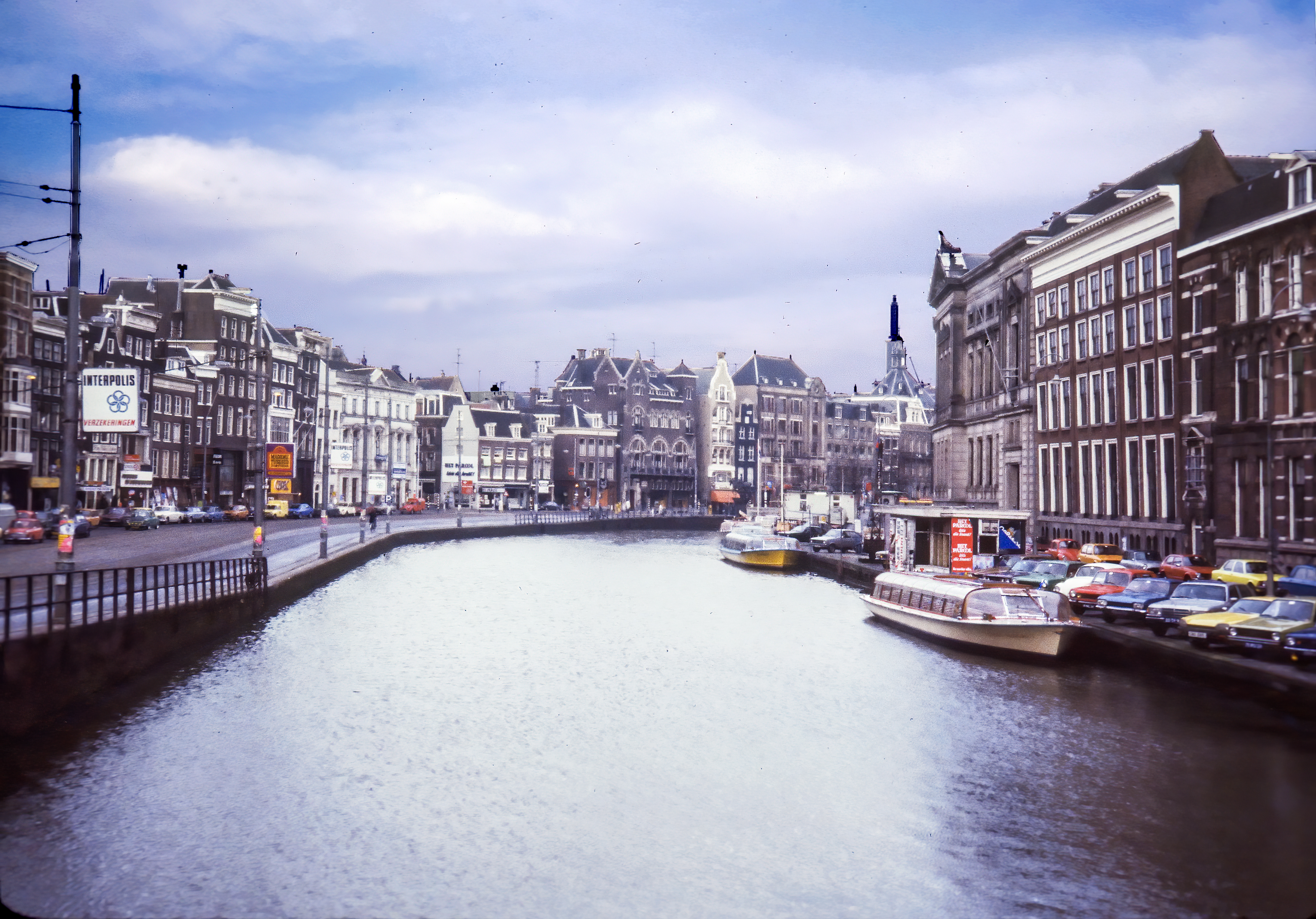
Rokin, Amsterdam - Nov 1977

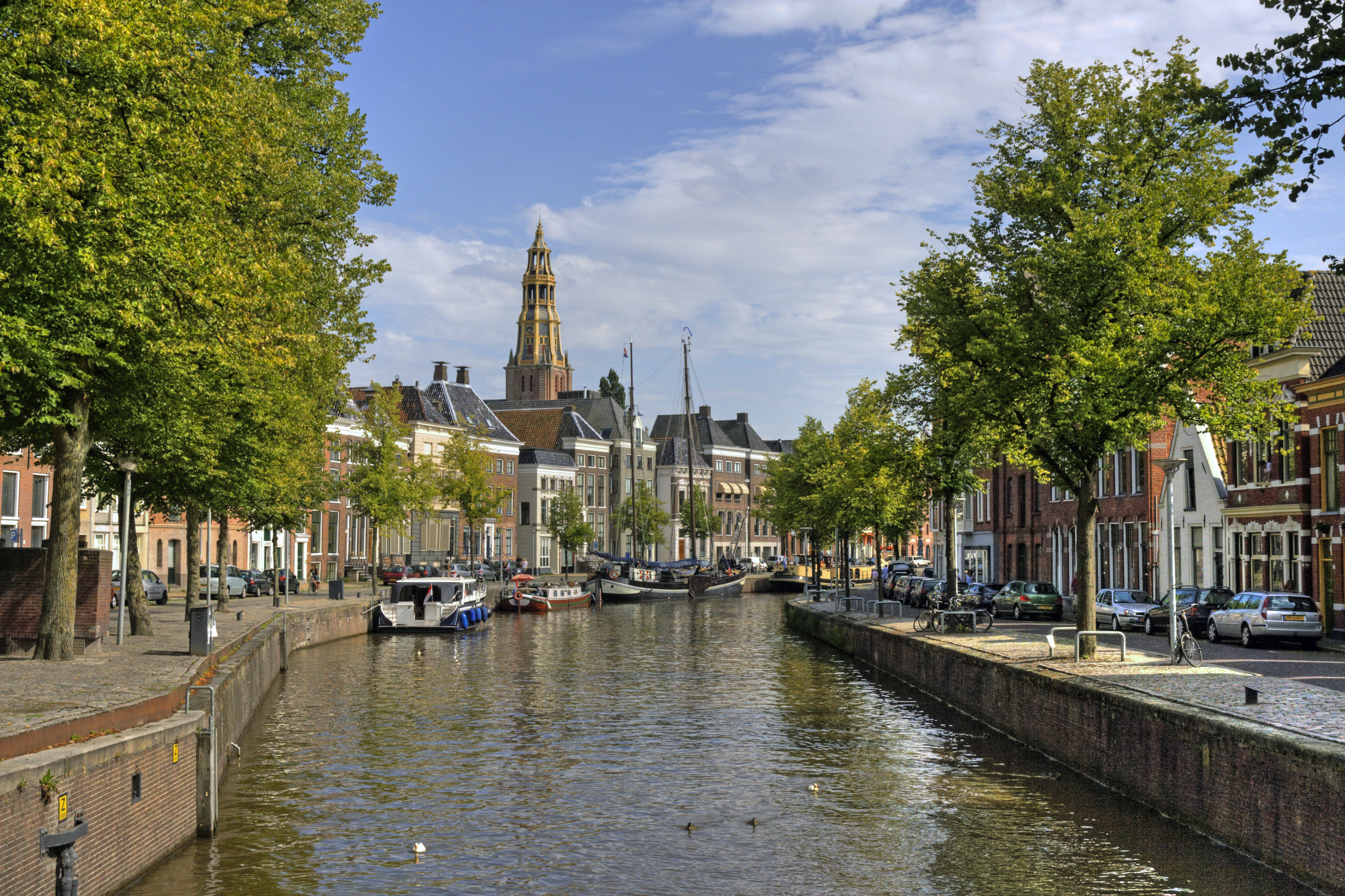
A gracht in Groningen, in the Northern Netherlands, locally referred to as a diep. This particular water way had an open connection to the Wadden Sea; the right quay is higher than the left, so ships could be loaded and unloaded at both high and low tide.

The word gracht cannot be easily translated; for this reason, it is necessary to distinguish between four related terms:

1. A gracht (city-canal) is a waterway in the city with one-way streets on both sides of the water. The streets are lined with houses, often in a closed front. In rare cases, there is only one street, and on the other side of the waterway, the houses border on the water.
2. A kanaal (literally meaning 'canal') is a man-made watercourse, usually in the countryside, with or without streets along its banks.
3. A vaart is a canal used for transport, rather than for other purposes such as drainage. Like most kanalen, they are usually in the countryside.
4. A singel is by origin a water-filled moat which surrounds a city for defense purposes. When the city expands, the singel is incorporated in the city's structure and can no longer be distinguished from a gracht, but the name singel is usually maintained. As such, singels often encircle (older) parts of the city. However, in other cases regular grachten were dug in circles as well, like the famous Grachtengordel (literal translation: grachten belt) of Amsterdam.

Although the word gracht means 'canal' or 'waterway' in the general sense, there is no exact equivalent for the term in English.

=== In Flemish ===
The Dutch language spoken in the north of Belgium, Flemish, is different from the standard Dutch language spoken in the Netherlands. In Belgium the word gracht can also mean ditch. For example: Cars can end up in the ditch and a Belgian news paper would write Wagen in de gracht beland above their news article. A dry ditch, alongside the road, has nothing to do with the canals in Amsterdam and it makes people from the Netherlands frown when they hear or read this for the first time. A dry ditch next to a road would be called greppel in the Dutch language of the Netherlands, not gracht. On a side note: Using wagen instead of auto to indicate a car is another give away that the article was written in Flemish.

== Etymology ==
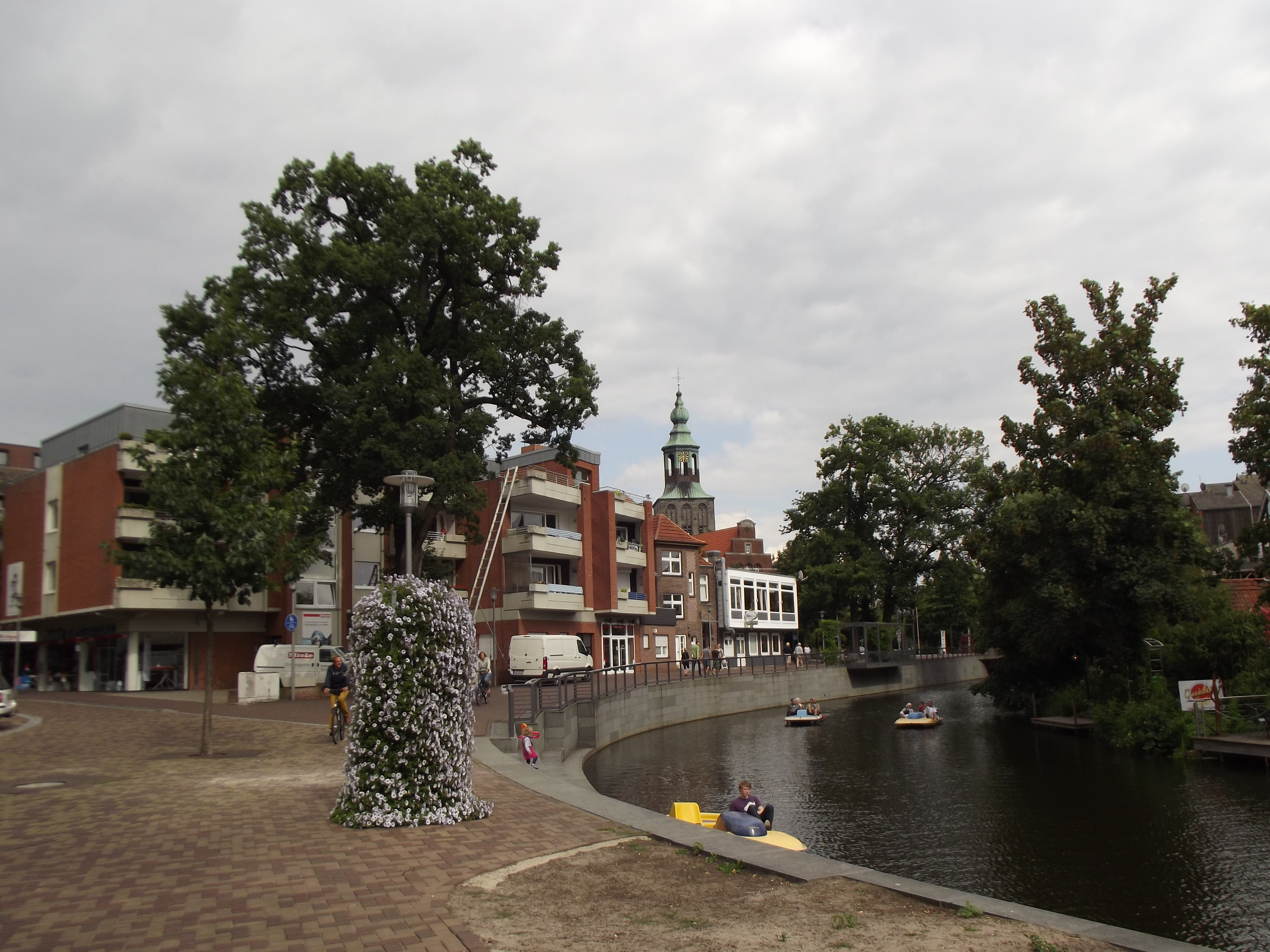
A gracht in Nordhorn, a German city with close ties to the Netherlands

The word gracht stems from the older word graft, which is derived from graven, to dig (cf. English "grave"). The Dutch language has had a sound shift in which the combination -ft became -cht. Other examples are lucht (German: Luft, air) and zacht (English: soft). In some regional languages such as Frisian and Gronings, the word graft is still used.

In Dutch, the word gracht is used only when canals are located inside the city, while canals outside a city are called kanaal. However, Venice is an exception. In Dutch, one does not say "de grachten van Venetië" (the city-canals of Venice), but "de kanalen van Venetië" (the canals of Venice).

Toponyms for grachten are usually made by the suffixes -gracht, -singel (which refers to the old circle-shaped canals), -wal (referring to the bank of the gracht), -vest (referring to a fortification), and -kade (Southern Dutch: -kaai; quay). The suffix -diep is used in Groningen where it is a local word for a large canal.

When a gracht is a remake of an old river, the river's name is used.

== History ==
Grachten were the life-lines of Dutch and Flemish cities. They were used for many purposes: for transportation, for draining, as water supply and as sewers, all at the same time. In heavily populated cities, these combined functions repeatedly proved to be detrimental to the public health.

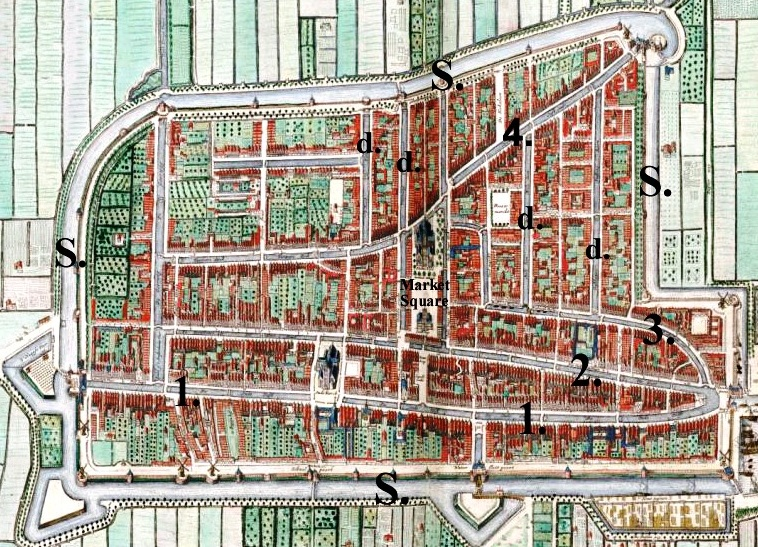
Grachten in Delft in relation to the origin of the city. Numbers entered in the historical map of Blaeu 1652.

Most Hanseatic cities have grachten to transport, to load and to land goods in and from ships. In the Netherlands, the northeastern cities of Deventer, Hindeloopen, Kampen, Leeuwarden, Meppel, Sneek, Zutphen and Zwolle are renowned for their historical grachten. Other cities in the Netherlands, in the western part of the country, are also touristic attractions because of their grachten, especially Alkmaar, Amersfoort, Gouda, Hoorn, Leiden, Utrecht and Weesp.

Sometimes grachten were made from older rivers, like in Groningen. There the older river called Drentse Aa was used as a natural part of the grachten. In Delft, the main gracht – Oude Delft – started as a drainage canal for reclaiming land in marshy surroundings: in a period roughly around the year 1100, a canal was dug, making use of a natural creek in the marshy country. This canal was called Delf, later on Delft, from the word delven that is akin to the verb to "delve" in English. This canal was used to drain the land at both sides; later on it also served as a waterway for transport.

Later, a second canal, called the Nieuwe Delft (New Delft) was dug through part of the settlement that had grown around the first. The original canal became known as the Oude Delft (Old Delft), a name it still bears today.

The rural village around Oude and Nieuwe Delft developed into a more urban area and the canals gradually acquired the character of city-canals or grachten. A third canal was dug and also changed into a gracht; it connected with the moat around the marketplace. The city and the grachten grew hand in hand. In 1246, this agglomeration was granted a city charter by the Count of Holland and became the City of Delft. A natural waterway was later incorporated in the city and became a gracht as well. Circular canals or singels were dug and surrounded the city. Fortifications were built along these singels and fixed the shape of the historical inner city of Delft. The characteristic, narrow grachten, perpendicular to the main grachten, developed from ditches that had been dug to drain and delimit the fields which preceded the city.

When it was still a Dutch colony, Cape Town had a network of grachten, that were fed by the springs at the base of Table Mountain. These provided water and sanitation for the infant town. In the ensuing centuries, the grachten were covered over, but many of the prominent streets in the modern city centre still bear their names (notably the Heerengracht, Keizersgracht, Buitengracht and Buitensingel). There is currently a project to restore some of these historic waterways.

A function in almost every city was drainage. Rainwater flowed through these city-canals. Usually they were also used as a sewer. Because these functions are not needed any more, many grachten have been filled in to give access to road traffic. However, these new streets have mostly retained the names of the grachts and singels they covered or replaced.

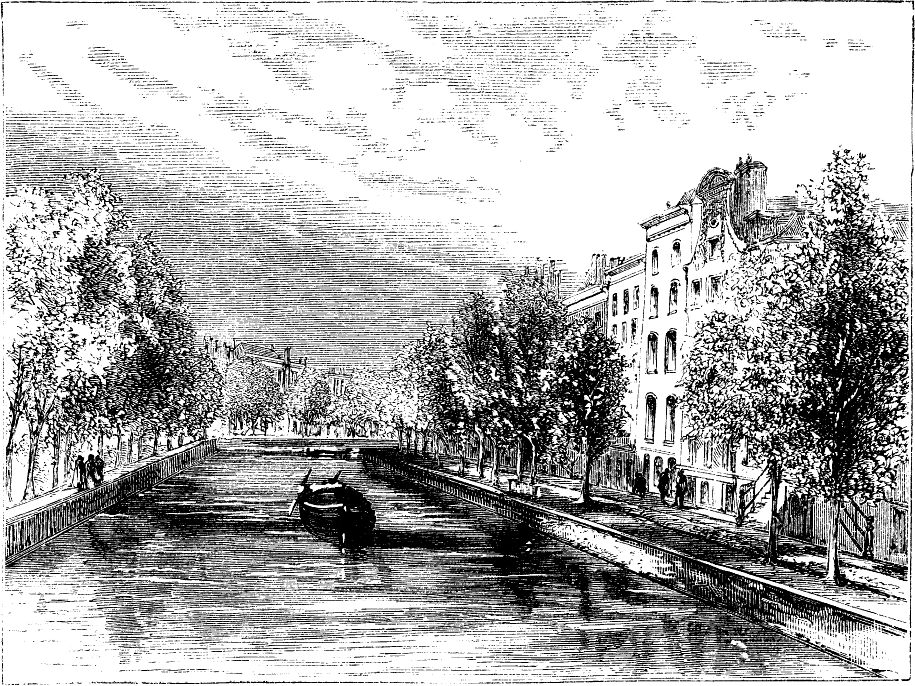
Heerengracht in 1872

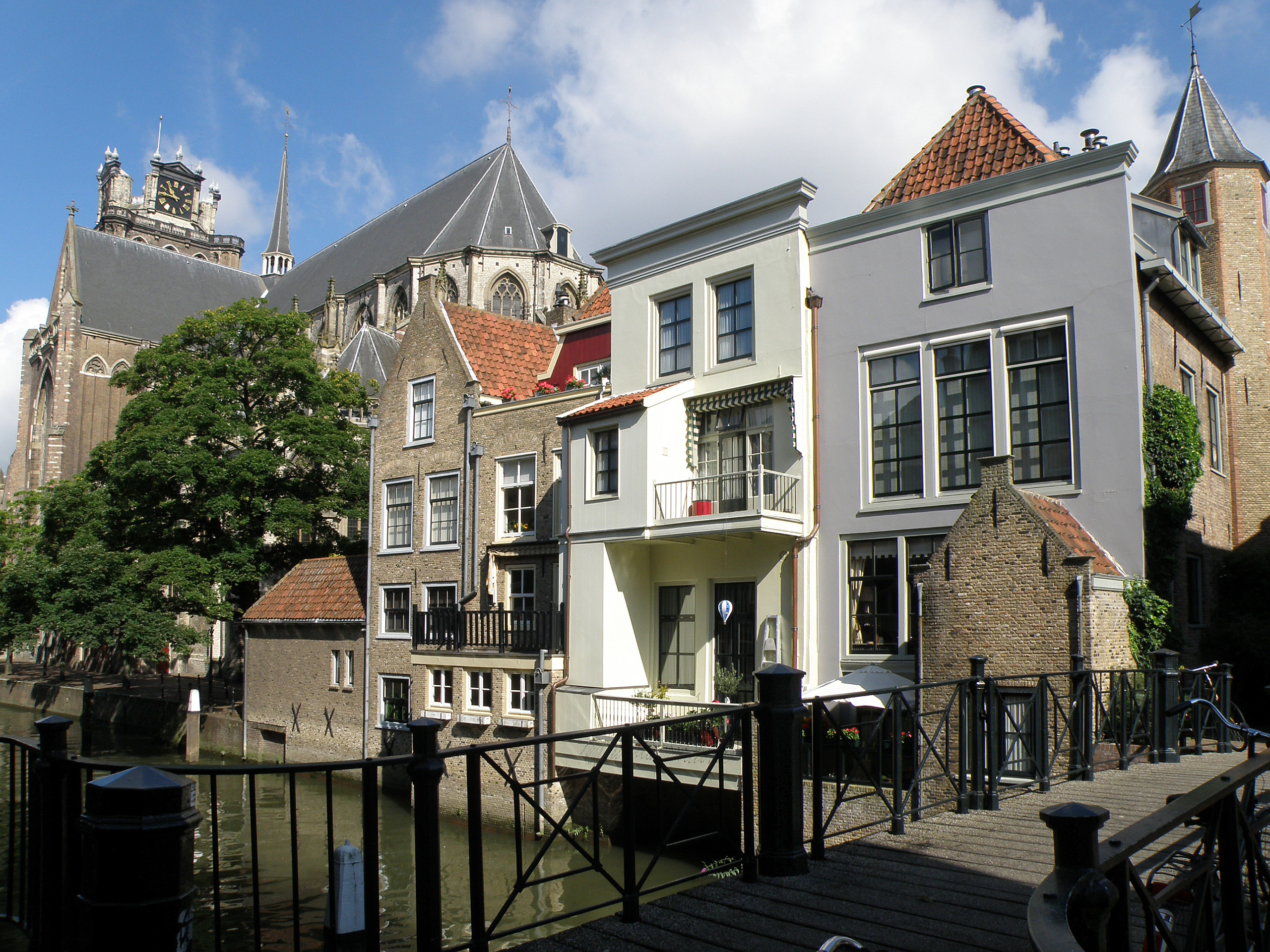
Dordrecht

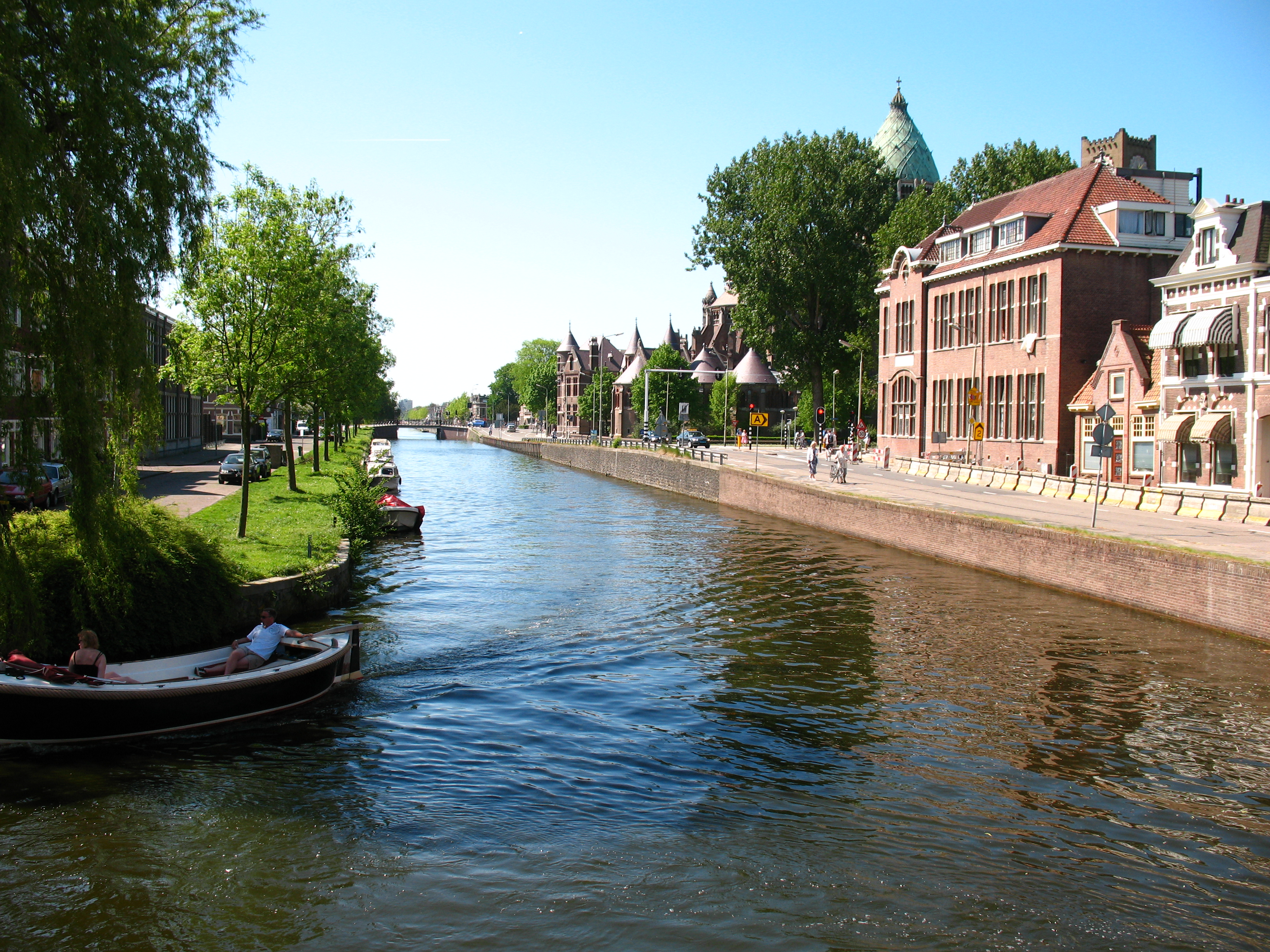
Haarlem

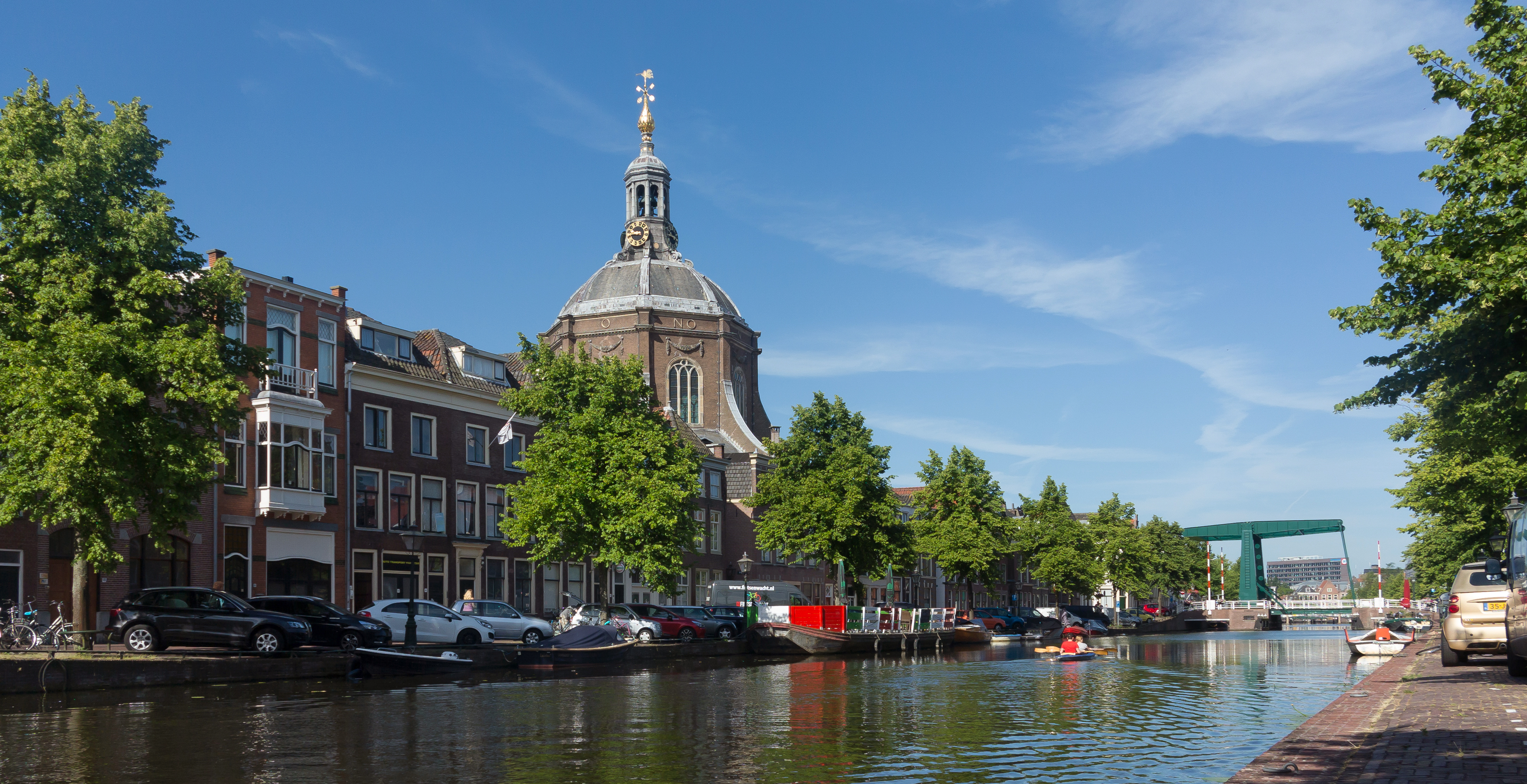
Leiden

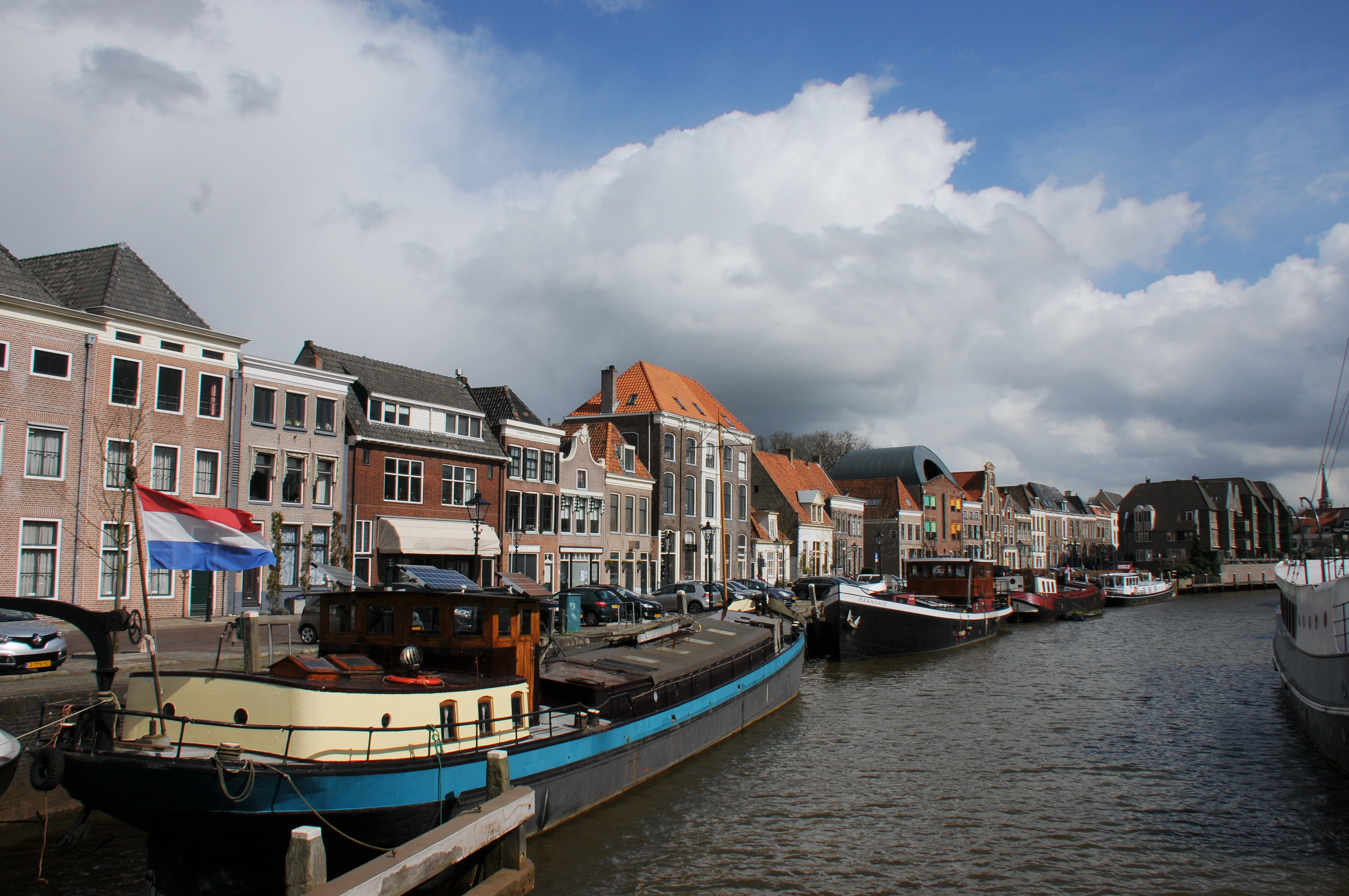
Zwolle
