= De Zalm =

Dutch Inn

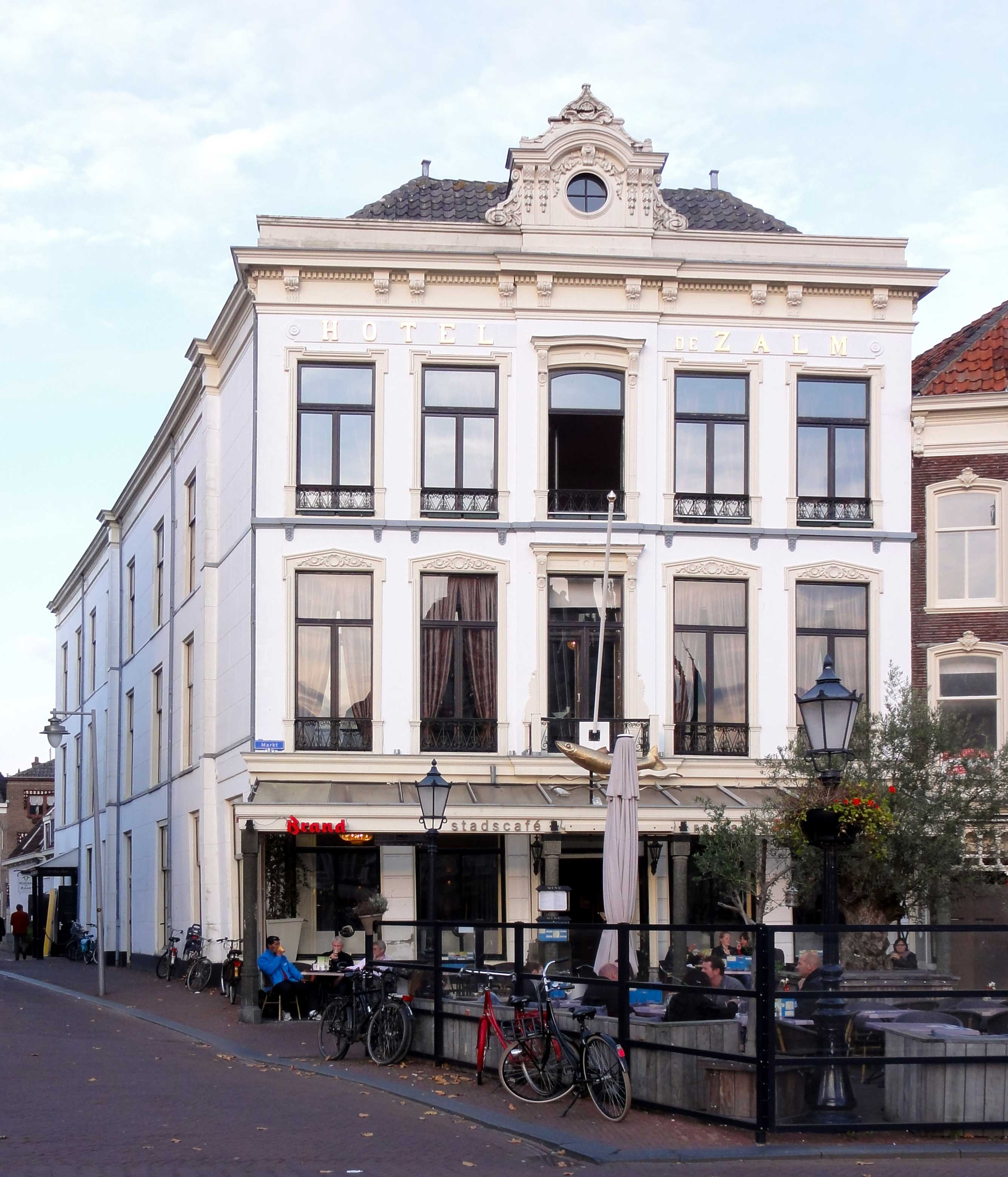
- Hotel De Zalm
- Native name: Brasserie - Bar De Zalm
- Industry: Hotel
- Founded: 1551
- Headquarters: Markt 34, 2801 Gouda, Netherlands
- Website: dezalm.com

De Zalm is the oldest inn in Gouda city, South Holland, Netherlands.

In 1551, the inn was called the Old Salm or Gilded Salm. In 1688, the historic Waag building was built by the architect Pieter Post located next to the tavern.

The word zalm means salmon and its statue was returned to the roof in 2006.

The building was enrolled as a national monument on 28 March 1966 in the monument register.

== See also ==
- List of oldest companies
