= G. Kolff & Co. =

Publishing house and book shop in the Dutch-Indies

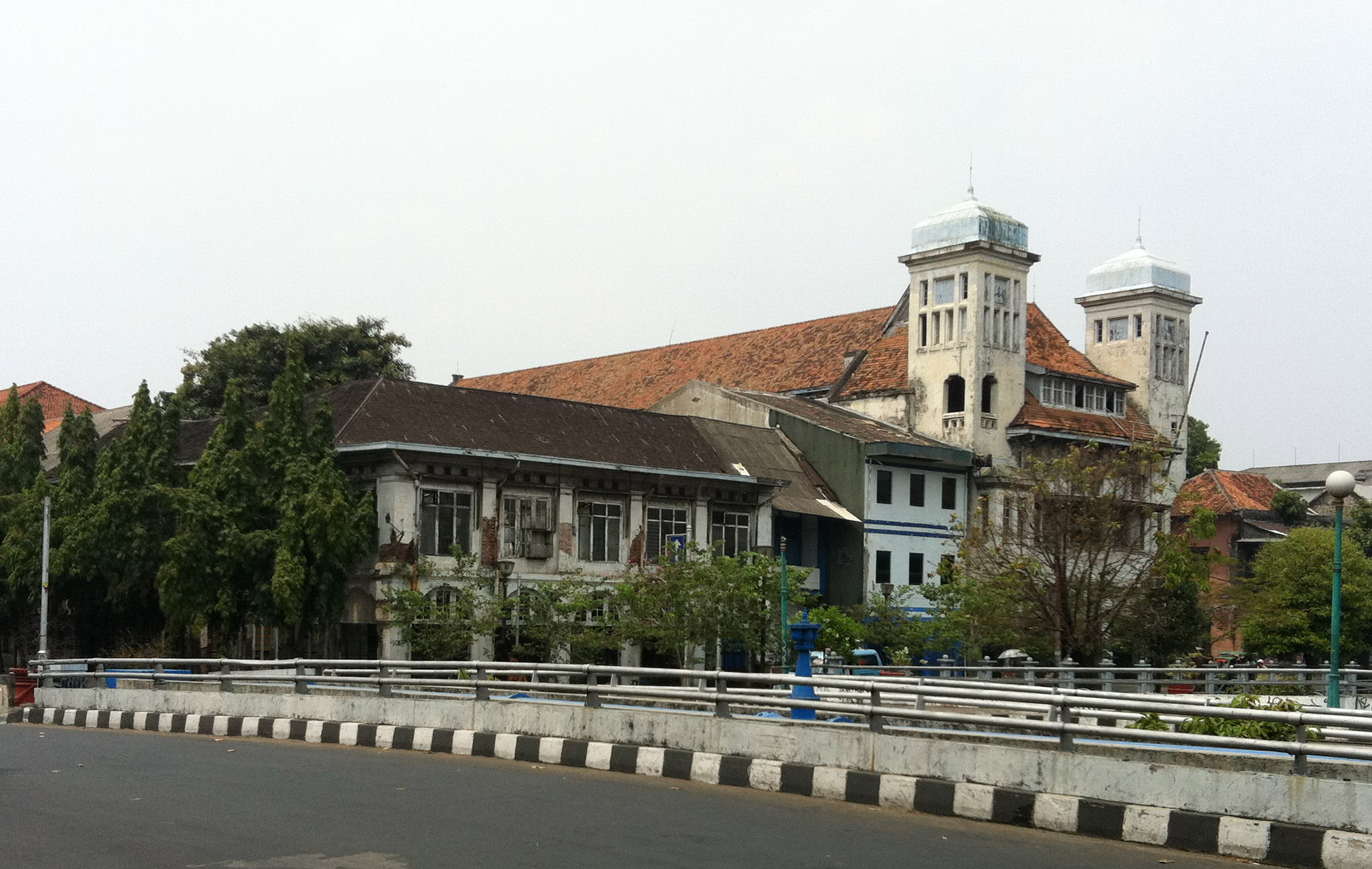
The building behind the trees was the premise of G. Kolff & Co. in Jakarta, once one of the first and the most successful bookseller in the Indies. Unfortunately the building collapsed in 2015 and now has been demolished.

G. Kolff & Co., was a firm specializing in bookselling, publishing and printing based in Batavia (now Jakarta).

The firm was one of the first booksellers to open in Batavia, the other (and probably the oldest) was Lange & Co. which is based on Rijswijkstraat (now the southern Jalan Ir. H. Juanda), Batavia. G. Kolff & Co. was one of the largest and most successful book selling company in the colonial Dutch East Indies before present-day Gramedia. In the field of publishing G. Kolff & Co.'s main competitors were Lange & Co., G.C.T. van Dorp, and Albrecht & Co.

G. Kolff & Co. has ceased to exist.

== History ==
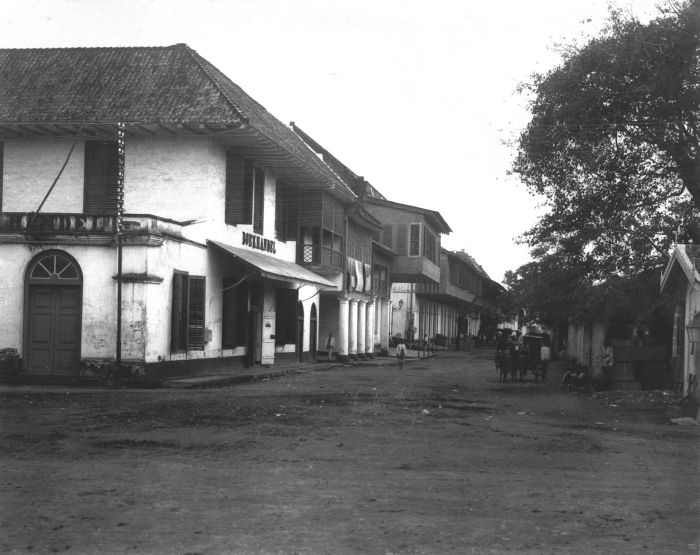
The bookshop G. Kolff & Co. in Kali Besar Oost (now Jalan Kali Besar Timur) ca. 1890.

In October 1848, van Haren Noman established its first bookshop, operated as van Haren Noman, in a small rented room on Buiten Nieuwpoort Straat (now Jalan Pintu Besar Selatan). Not long after, van Haren Noman acquired larger premises on Binnen Nieuwpoort Straat (now Jalan Pintu Besar Utara).

On July 3, 1850, Gualtherus Johannes Cornelis Kolff arrived from the Netherlands to join the firm. In 1853, Kolff was made a partner of the new company, and the name of the firm was changed to Van Haren Noman & Kolff. In 1858, van Haren Noman returned to the Netherlands and the firm became G. Kolff & Co.

In 1860, G. Kolff & Co. bought a larger premises in Kali Besar for 28,000 guilders. The premises was located on the southern corner of Pasar Pisang (Jalan Kali Besar Timur 3) and Kali Besar Oost (Jalan Kali Besar Timur). They served as the head office of G. Kolff & Co. until May 1921, when new and larger premises were opened in Jalan Pecenongan near Pasar Baru. This first building of G. Kolff & Co. still exists today the building has been demolished after its northern wall collapsed caused by years of no maintenance. Kolff also opened another bookshop in Noordwijk (now Jalan Juanda) in 1894, closer to the new Menteng-Gondangdia residential development to the south. Over the years, branches were opened throughout Java.

The firm of Kolff was one of the early promoters of the leading newspaper Java Bode in the early 1850s and had affiliations with leading colonial newspapers in the Indies, e.g.De Locomotief in Semarang and Het Soerabaiasche Handelsblad in Surabaya. In 1885, Kolff launched the daily Bataviaasch Nieuwsblad, which was published in Batavia and existed to 1957.

In 1930, the Dutch Queen Wilhelmina granted Kolff the right to use the word "Koninklijke" (Royal) in their name and the firm became known as the Royal Bookshop and Printing Office G. Kolff & Co. (N.V. Koninklijke Boekhandel en Drukkerij G. Kolff & Co.). In 1932, Kolff entered the security printing field when the government awarded the firm contracts to print banderoles for the collection of tobacco excise.

G. Kolff & Co. was one of the largest producers of postcards of Batavia in early 20th-century. The postcards, which provides a glimpse of colonial Batavia between the 1900s to 1920s, are now collector's items. G. Kolff & Co. was also one of the largest supplier of educational books in the Netherlands Indies.

G. Kolff & Co. celebrated its centenary in 1948. G. Kolff & Co no longer exists today.

== See also ==
- List of colonial buildings and structures in Jakarta

== Cited works ==
- Merrillees, Scott (2000). Batavia in Nineteenth Century Photographs. Singapore: Editions Didier Millet. ISBN 9789813018778.
