= Warmaster (band) =

Dutch mrtal band

- Origin: Gouda, Netherlands
- Genres: Death metal
- Years active: 2004–present
- Labels: Deadbeat Media, Slaughterhouse Records
- Members: Corne Bijlemeer; Rik van Gageldonk; Marcel Oerlemans; Alex Schluter; Andre van der Ree
- Past members: Merijn Schenkels; Mike Boom
- Website: warmaster.nl

Warmaster is a Dutch old school death metal band from Gouda. The band's lyrical content deals with World War II.

== History ==
Warmaster formed in 2004 by guitarist Rik van Gageldonk and drummer Andre van der Ree for an old school death metal band. In 2005 singer Corne Bijlemeer and bass player Alex Schluter completed the band. The band members already knew each other from their previous and present bands like Asphyx, Gorefest, Thanatos, and Houwitser. Warmaster was influenced by old school death metal bands like Bolt Thrower, Obituary, and Master.

In December 2007 the band recorded their debut album First War, which was released by Dutch Metal Records in March 2008 and was followed by an extensive European tour with Jungle Rot.

In February 2013, the band returned to the studio to record 2 songs for a split 7-inch EP and its second full-length album The End of Humanity, scheduled for release in June (7-inch EP) and September (album) 2013 via Deadbeat Media and Slaughterhouse Records.

== Members ==
- Corne Bijlemeer – vocals
- Rik van Gageldonk – guitars
- Marcel Oerlemans – guitars
- Alex Schluter – bass guitar
- Andre van Ree (Eternal Solstice) – drums

== Discography ==
=== Albums ===
- First War (Dutch Metal Records, 2008)
- The End of Humanity (Deadbeat Media & Slaughterhouse Records, September 2013)

=== Singles ===
- split 7-inch EP with Humiliation (Deadbeat Media & Slaughterhouse Records, June 2013)
