= God of War =

A god of war is a deity associated with war.

God of War or Gods of War may also refer to:

== Books ==
- The Gods of War, a 1985 novel by historical author John Toland
- The Gods of War, a 2005 novel by Conn Iggulden and the fourth in the Emperor series
- The God of War, a 2008 novel by Marisa Silver
- Gods of War, a 2009 science fiction novel by Ashok Banker
- God of War (DC Comics), a 2010–2011 limited six-issue comic book series published by WildStorm and DC Comics, based around the Greek era of the video game series
- God of War, a 2010 novelization of the 2005 video game, God of War, written by Matthew Stover and Robert E. Vardeman
- God of War – The Official Novelization, a 2018 novelization of the 2018 video game, God of War, written by James Barlog
- God of War (Dark Horse Comics), a 2018–2021 limited two-volume eight-issue comic book series published by Dark Horse Comics, based around the Norse era of the video game series

== Film and television ==
- God of War (South Korean TV series), a 2012 television series about military leader Kim Jun
- God of War (2017 film), a Chinese historic war action film
- God of War (2025 film), an Iranian film about the Iran–Iraq War
- God of War (American TV series), an upcoming live-action adaptation of the Norse mythology era of the video game series

== Video games ==
- God of War (franchise), an action-adventure video game series
  - God of War (2005 video game), a video game for the PlayStation 2 and the first in the series
  - God of War (2018 video game), a video game for the PlayStation 4

== Music ==
=== Albums ===
- Gods of War (Blasphemy album), 1993, by black metal band Blasphemy
- Gods of War (Manowar album), 2007, by heavy metal band Manowar
- God of War: Blood & Metal, a 2010 EP of heavy metal music inspired by the God of War video game series

=== Songs ===
- "Gods of War" (song), 1987, by rock band Def Leppard
- "God of War", a song by Derek Sherinian
- "God of War", a song by the Faeroese band Týr

== See also ==
- Robert E. Rodes, American Civil War general, nicknamed the Norse God of War
- War Gods (disambiguation)
- Lord of War
