= Bolsius =

Bolsius is a Dutch candle manufacturer founded by Antonius Bolsius in 1870.

The company is headquartered in Schijndel. Its United Kingdom subsidiary Bolsius UK Ltd is headquartered in Wiltshire. In 2020, Bolsius employed around 900 people. In 2021, it closed its production location in Boxmeer. Most of the production is in Kobylin, Poland.
