= Lex van Haeften =

Dutch footballer

Personal information
- Date of birth: 26 June 1987 (age 39)
- Place of birth: Gouda, Netherlands
- Position: Goalkeeper

Youth career
- VV Nieuwerkerk
- 2007–2009: Excelsior

Senior career*
Years	Team	Apps	(Gls)
2009–2011	Excelsior	2	(0)
2011	XerxesDZB		
2014	GVVV		
- * Club domestic league appearances and goals

Lex van Haeften (born 26 June 1987) is a Dutch retired footballer who played as a goalkeeper.

Third keeper at Excelsior, whom he joined from amateurs Nieuwerkerk in 2007, he decided to move to amateur side XerxesDZB in summer 2011 in order to combine that with a career outside football. He left Xerxes later that year after losing his place between the posts. In January 2014 he surfaced at GVVV.
