= Warlord (disambiguation) =

A warlord is a military leader.

Warlord, War Lord or Warlords may also refer to:

== Arts and entertainment ==
=== Film ===
- The War Lord, a 1965 American film starring Charlton Heston
- The Warlord (film), a 1972 Hong Kong film directed by Li Han-hsiang
- Warlords (film), a 1988 American film
- The Warlords, a 2007 Chinese film directed by Peter Chan, starring Andy Lau, Jet Li and Takeshi Kaneshiro

=== Television ===
- "Warlord" (Star Trek: Voyager), a 1996 episode of Star Trek: Voyager
- "The War Lord" (I Spy), an episode of the series I Spy
- The War Lord, the chief of an alien race called the "War Lords" in the Doctor Who serial The War Games
- "The Warlords", fourth episode of the 1965 Doctor Who serial The Crusade
- The Warlord: Battle for the Galaxy

=== Music ===
- Warlord (California band), an American 1980s heavy metal band
- Warlord (hardcore band), an American 1990s metal/hardcore band
- Warlord (album), a 2016 album by Yung Lean
- Warlord, a 1989 Skrewdriver album
- Warlord (demo), by Norther, 2000
- "The War Lord" (instrumental), theme music of the 1965 film

=== Comics ===
- Warlord (DC Thomson), a comic
- Warlord (manhua), a Hong Kong manhua written by Wan Yuet Long and drawn by Tang Chi Fai
- Warlord (DC Comics), a sword and sorcery comics series

=== Novels ===
- Warlords, a 1979 novel by Bob Langley
- The Warlord, a 1983–1987 series of novels by Jason Frost
  - The Warlord, a 1983 novel, the first novel in the series
- The Warlord, a 1983 novel by Malcolm Bosse
- Warlord!, a 1987 novel by Janet Morris
- Warlord, a 1990 novel by Kevin D. Randle, writing as Eric Helm
- The Warlord, a 1995 novel by Elizabeth Elliott
- Warlord, a 2003 book by David Drake and S. M. Stirling, an omnibus of the first two Bellevue series novels
- The Warlords, a 2003 novel by Matt Braun
- War Lord, a 2006 novel based on the DC Comics character John Constantine, written by John Shirley
- Warlord, a 2005 novel by Jennifer Fallon
- Warlord, a 2007 book by Angela Knight, an omnibus of the first two Time Hunters series novels
- Warlord, a 2010 novel by Ted Bell
- Warlord, a 2012 novel by Angus Donald, the fourth volume in The Outlaw Chronicles
- The Warlords, a 2016 novel by Richard Denham and M. J. Trow, the third volume in the Britannia trilogy
- Warlord, a 2017 novel by Chris Ryan
- War Lord (novel), a 2020 novel by Bernard Cornwell, the last volume of The Saxon Stories
- Warlord, a 2020 novel by Mel Odom, the third volume in the Makaum War series

=== Games ===
- Warlords (game series), a series of computer games developed by SSG and later Infinite Interactive
  - Warlords (1990 video game), the first game in the series
  - Warlords (card game), a collectible card game based on the third game in the series
- Warlord: Saga of the Storm CCG, a collectible card game (with an accompanying table-top role-playing game)
- Civilization IV: Warlords, the first expansion pack to the Civilization IV game series
- Warlord (miniature game), a miniatures wargame produced by Reaper Miniatures
- Warlord (play-by-mail game)
- The Warlord (board game), a game self-published by Mike Hayes in 1966
- Warlords (1980 video game), a game released by Atari in 1980
- Warlord (Dungeons & Dragons), a Dungeons & Dragons character class
- Warlord, a fused mash-up version of the characters Reiko and Raiden in Mortal Kombat 1

== Other uses ==
- The Warlord (wrestler), a ring name of professional wrestler Terry Szopinski
- War Lords, a militant African-American youth organization founded in the 1960s
- "WARLORDS", call sign of United States Navy helicopter squadron HSM-51
- VMFA-451, a deactivated United States Marine Corps fighter squadron that was nicknamed "The Warlords"

== See also ==
- Lord of War, a 2005 film starring Nicolas Cage
- Lords of War, a 2027 film starring Nicolas Cage, also called Lord of War 2
