= Crabeth =

Crabeth is a surname. Notable people with the surname include:

- Adriaen Pietersz Crabeth (1510–1553), Dutch glass painter
- Dirk Crabeth (1501–1574), Dutch glass painter, tapestry designer, and mapmaker
- Wouter Crabeth I (1510–1590), Dutch glass painter
- Wouter Crabeth II (1594–c. 1644), Dutch painter
