= Jacob van der Ulft =

Dutch painter

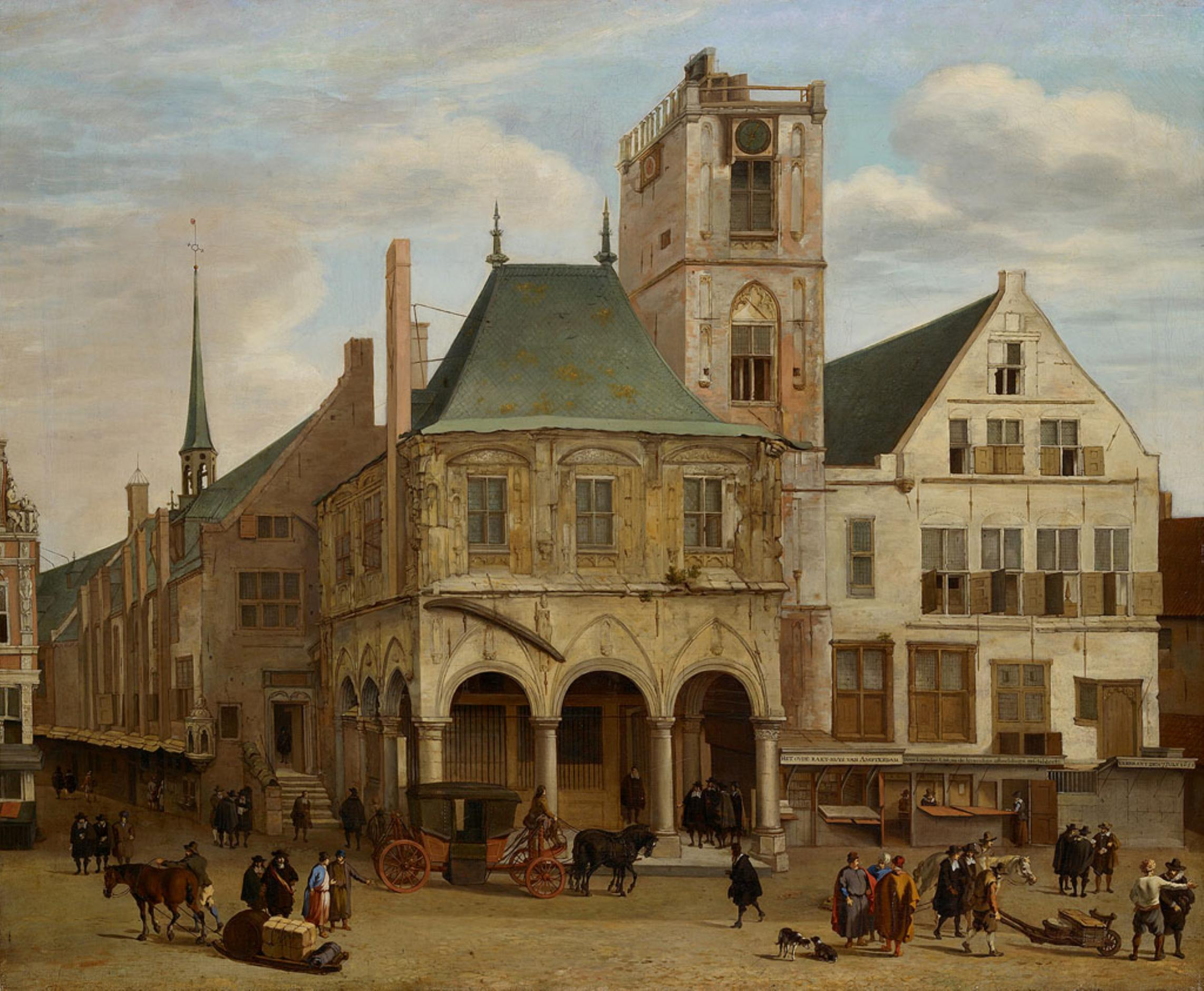
- Old City Hall of Amsterdam.
- Born: 1621, Gorinchem
- Died: November 18, 1689 (aged 68), Noordwijk
- Movement: Baroque

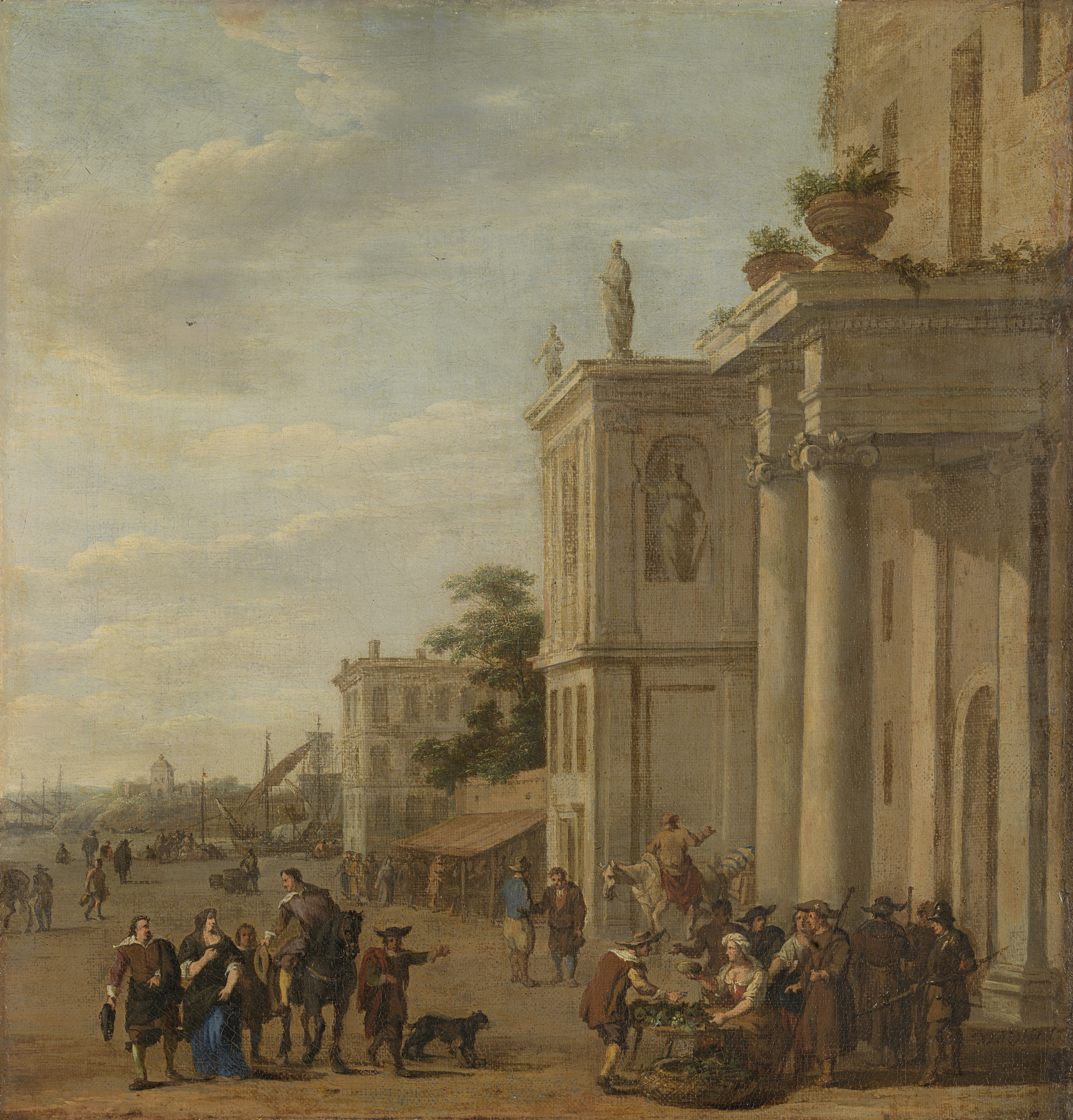
Italian market scene

Jacob van der Ulft (Dutch pronunciation: [ˈjaːkɔp fɑn dər ˈʏl(ə)ft]; 1621–1689) was a Dutch painter, glass painter, print artist, architect and mayor. He was known for his architectural and city views, landscapes and topographical views.

== Life ==
He was the son of the mayor of Gorinchem. He was registered in Gorinchem during the years 1652–1683. In 1658 he is registered as making sketches of heraldic shields for the city of Gorinchem. In 1659 he is mentioned in a notarized document as being a painter and an architect. Like his father he became a mayor of Gorinchem from 1660 to 1679. In 1679 he fled to The Hague for a short period following accusations of corruption.

In 1683 he left Gorinchem definitely for Noordwijk, where he later died.

== Work ==
Van der Ulft was known for his paintings, gouaches and many drawings, as well as stained glass paintings.

Van der Ulft was according to the early biographer Arnold Houbraken the best glass painter of his century. The artist went to great trouble to reinvent the techniques of Dirk Crabeth and his brother Wouter. Gorinchem and the surrounding towns all had examples of his stained glass work. Van der Ulft made oil painting and engraving of old ruins, showing each crack and cranny. He painted many Italianate landscapes with monuments and triumphal arches. These were based on Italianate prints since according to Houbraken the artist had never visited Italy.

Van der Ulft's painting of the old city hall of Amsterdam (Amsterdam Museum) was based on an earlier painting by Pieter Jansz Saenredam (1657, Rijksmuseum) since at the time he made the painting the old city hall had been destroyed by fire in 1652. The painting shows the city hall in a dilapidated condition. When compared with the painting by Pieter Jansz Saenredam van der Ulft gave his version a wider foreground in which he placed more staffage. He also copied the incorrect date of the fire from Saenredam, which was written on the canopy of the town hall: '1651', a year too early. The painting also shows the whalebone hanging from the vierschaar (courtroom) given to the city by Willem Barentsz. A similar whalebone still hangs in the Haarlem City Hall. This painting, highly detailed and populated with townspeople in all manner of dress and occupation contributed to his fame.
