= Arnold of Nijmegen =

Dutch stained glass artist

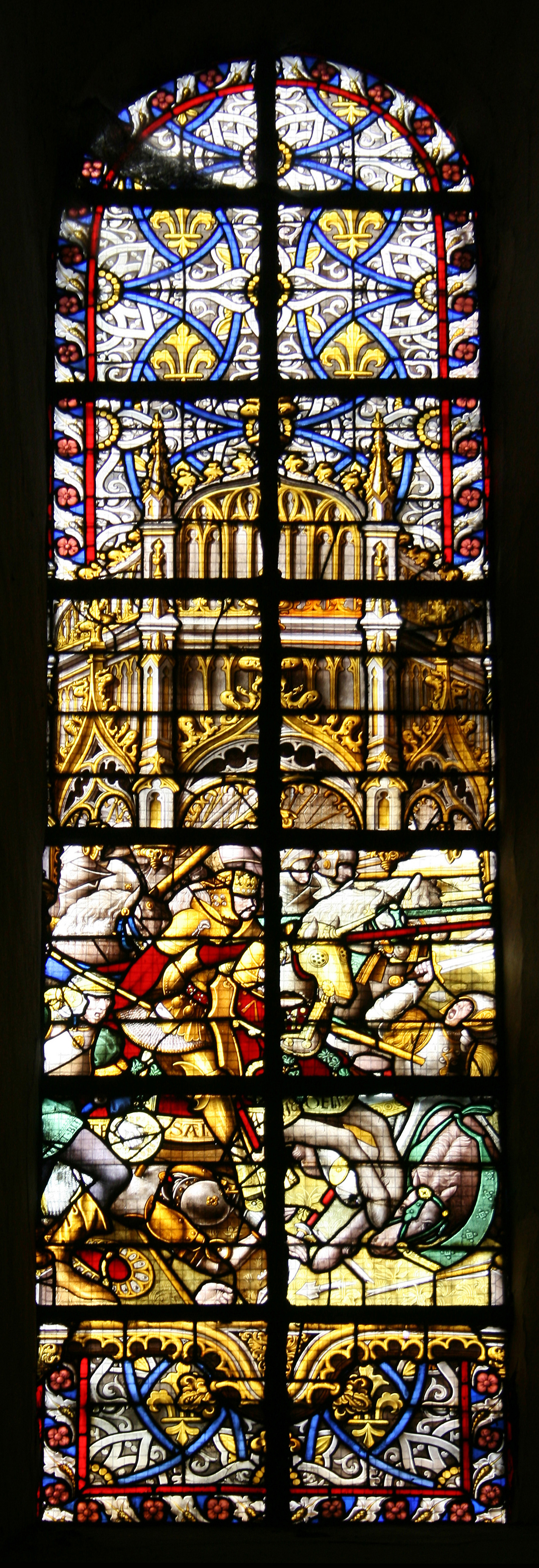
One of a series of windows in Tournai Cathedral, showing a battle scene framed in High Gothic architectural elements

Arnold of Nijmegen (also known as Aert Ortkens, Aert van Hort, Arnoud van Nijmegen, Arnt van Ort van Nijmegen, Arnoult de Nimègue, Arnouldt de la Pointe) (active c. 1490 – c. 1536) was a 15th-century Dutch stained glass artist who worked in both modern-day Belgium and France, adopting the Renaissance style and influencing the stained glass workshops of Normandy. His best known works are a series of windows depicting historical subjects in Tournai Cathedral, Belgium. His work is known for its delicate draftsmanship, brilliance of colouring, the rich decoration of robes and detailed architectural settings. He was praised in his own time by the writers Noviomagus (1522) and Francesco Guicciardini (published 1567).

== Work ==
=== Early works ===
The earliest works of Arnold of Nijmegen in Gelderland, now in the Netherlands, are two cycles of windows in the transepts of Tournai Cathedral, both depicting important events in the history of the town. One cycle depicts a sequence of events which took place in the 6th century, and led to the Cathedral of Tournai having the rights to collect tolls and taxes. The narratives which are depicted in the lower section of the windows show the defeat of King Chilperic by his brother Sigebert, the protection of Chilperic by the Bishop of Tournai, and the plotting and assassination of Sigebert by Chilperic's wife Queen Fredegund. The upper sections of the same windows depict various aspects of taxation and toll collection by the clergy of Tournai Cathedral. The second cycle tells how the city, having been annexed to Noyon, gained favour with Pope Eugene III through the influence of Bernard of Clairveaux and regained its rights.

The style of these windows is High Gothic in character, and strongly influenced by Early Netherlandish painters of the 15th century such as Jan van Eyck. This can be seen in the proportions of his figures, with small heads and long bodies, and in the elaborate and richly decorated robes. The style also has much in common with the style of tapestries that were produced at the Tournai factories.

=== Later works ===
In 1502 Arnold travelled to Rouen in France, where he was to have a very strong influence on the schools of stained glass painters in Normandy. His windows at this date are generally signed "Arnouldt de la Pointe". His work combined the medieval iconography and naturalism of 15th century Flanders with the architectonic motifs of Italian Renaissance art and the influence of Northern Renaissance printmakers such as Albrecht Dürer, who visited him in 1521. In 1513, he returned to Antwerp where he was admitted to the Guild of St Luke, but continued to maintain contact with his pupils in Normandy and for many years supplied cartoons for windows in France.

Examples of his signed work include a large Tree of Jesse window in the Church Saint-Godard of Rouen (1506); a Martyrdom of Saint Stephen at the Church Saint-Romain of Rouen and a Three Marys window made in Antwerp in about 1526 for the Church Notre-Dame of Louviers.

Other windows by Arnold have survived in England at Wells Cathedral, Lichfield Cathedral, York Minster and St George's Church, Hannover Square. The Victoria and Albert Museum has three panels depicting scenes from the life of Saint Peter. The panels are sections of a window from a church in Rouen. The Metropolitan Museum of Art holds two roundels showing the heads of Christ and John the Baptist.

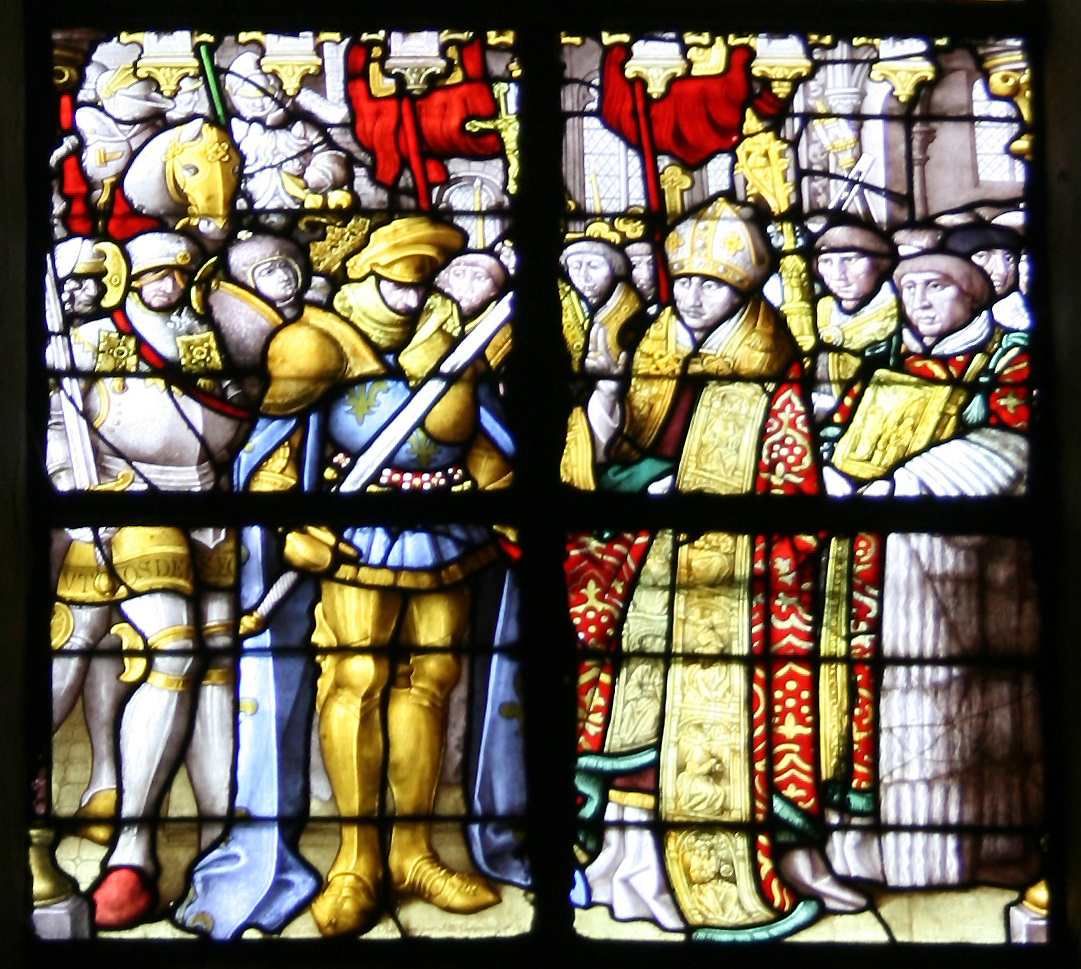
King Chilperic receives the blessing of the Bishop of Tournai.

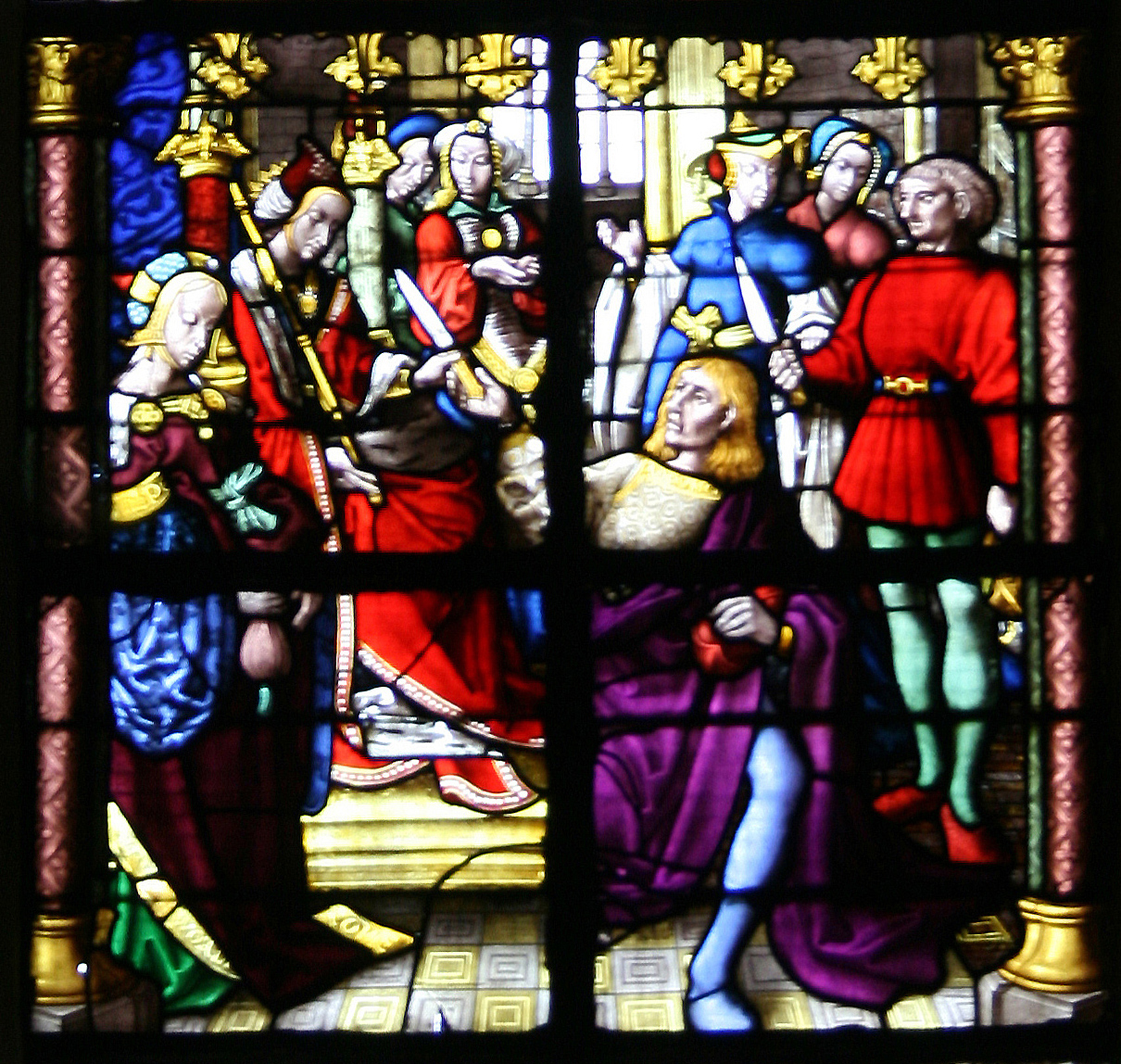
Queen Fredegund hires assassins.

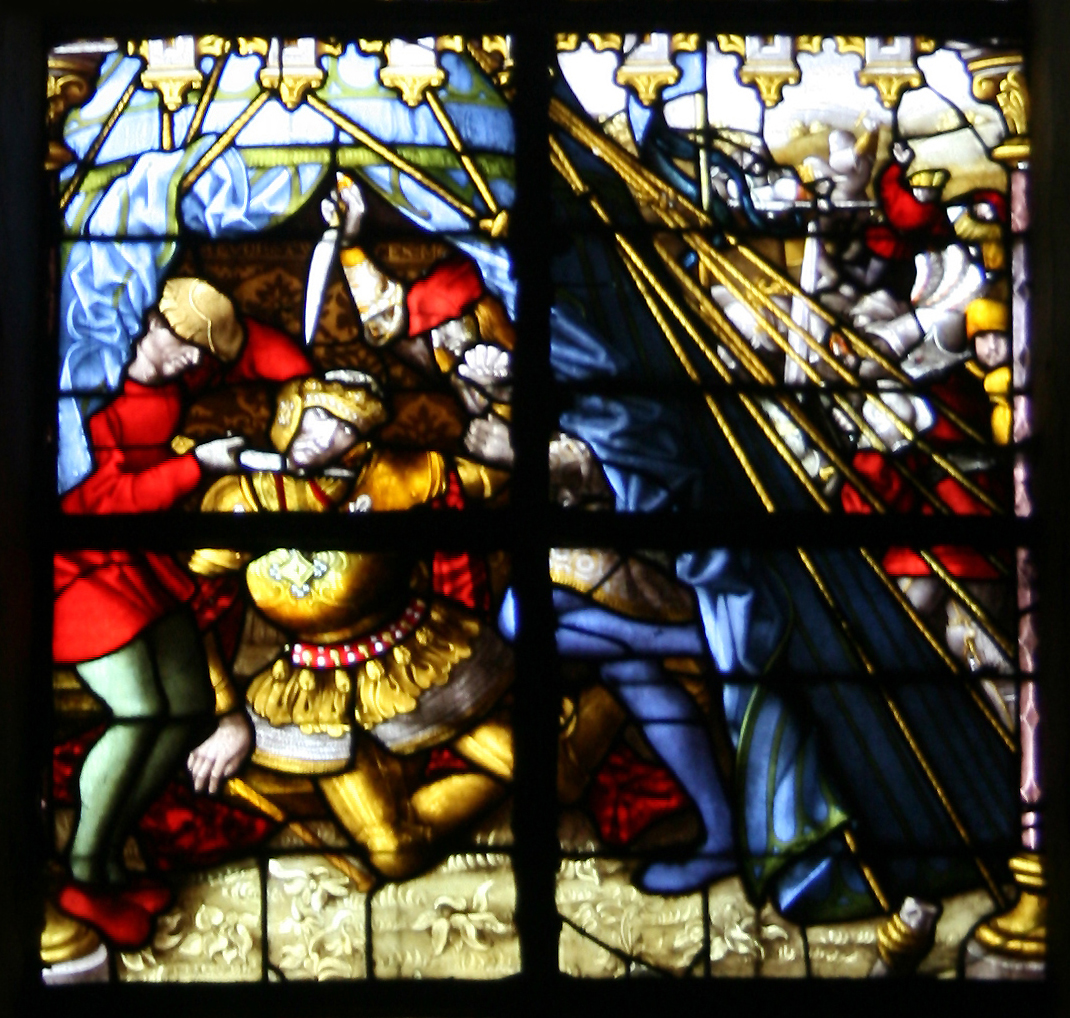
The regicide of King Sigebert.

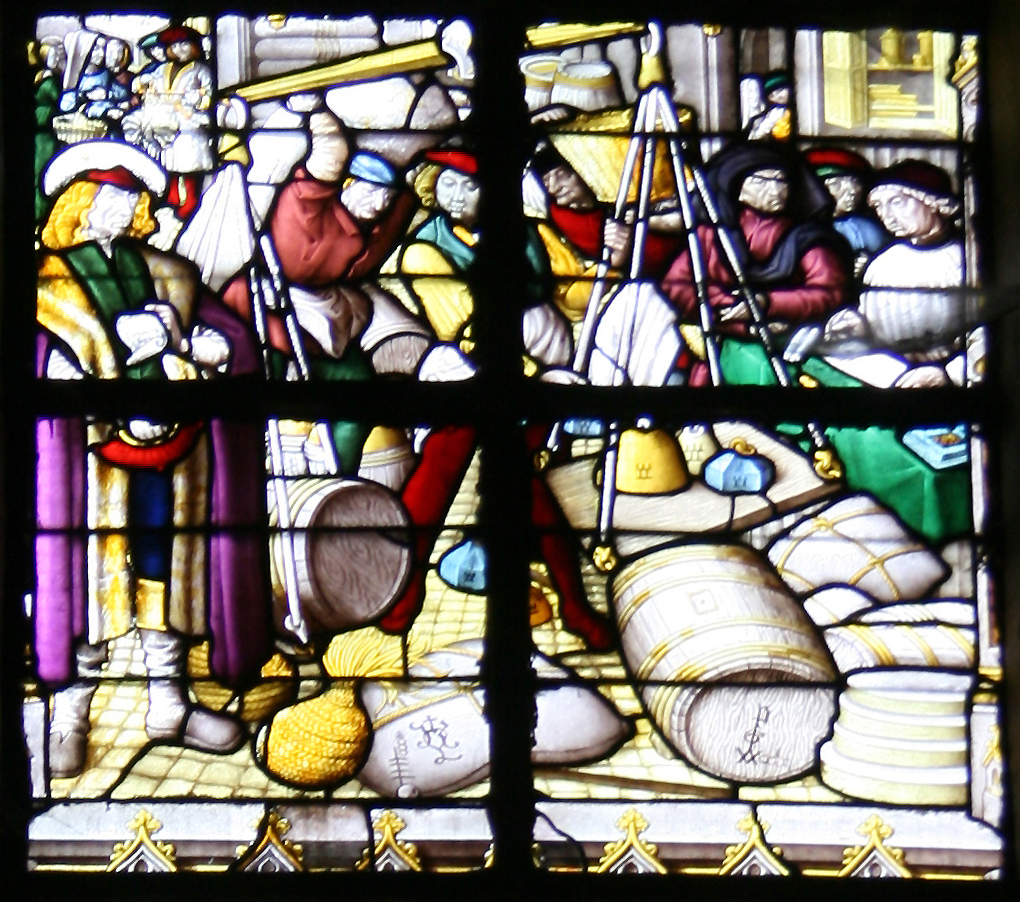
A merchant's goods are weighed for taxation.

== See also ==
- Medieval stained glass
- Dirk Crabeth
- Wouter Crabeth II
