= Jan Ariens Duif =

Dutch Golden Age painter

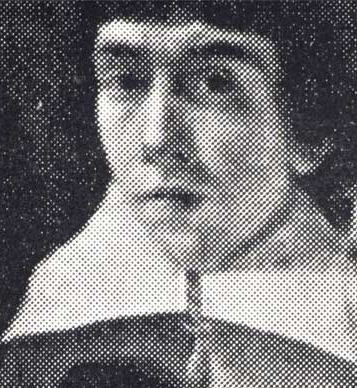
- Self-portrait by Jan Ariens Duif
- Born: about 1617
- Died: 1649
- Known for: Painting, Etching

Jan Ariens Duif (about 1617 in Gouda – 1649 in Gouda) was a Dutch Golden Age painter.

== Biography ==
He was taken to the Gouda orphanage at age nine, where his drawing talent was discovered and ten years later he painted the regents with himself next to the resident father. He was a student of his uncle, Wouter Crabeth II. He married in 1647 but died only two years later. His religious paintings hang in the Gouda Lutheran church and in the Catherina Gasthuis, a museum in Gouda.

According to Houbraken, he died of a sudden illness, along with two colleagues; Jan Govertsz Verbyl and Aert van Waes (who had just returned from Italy). The RKD disagrees, and estimates the death of Van Waes between the years 1664–1684.

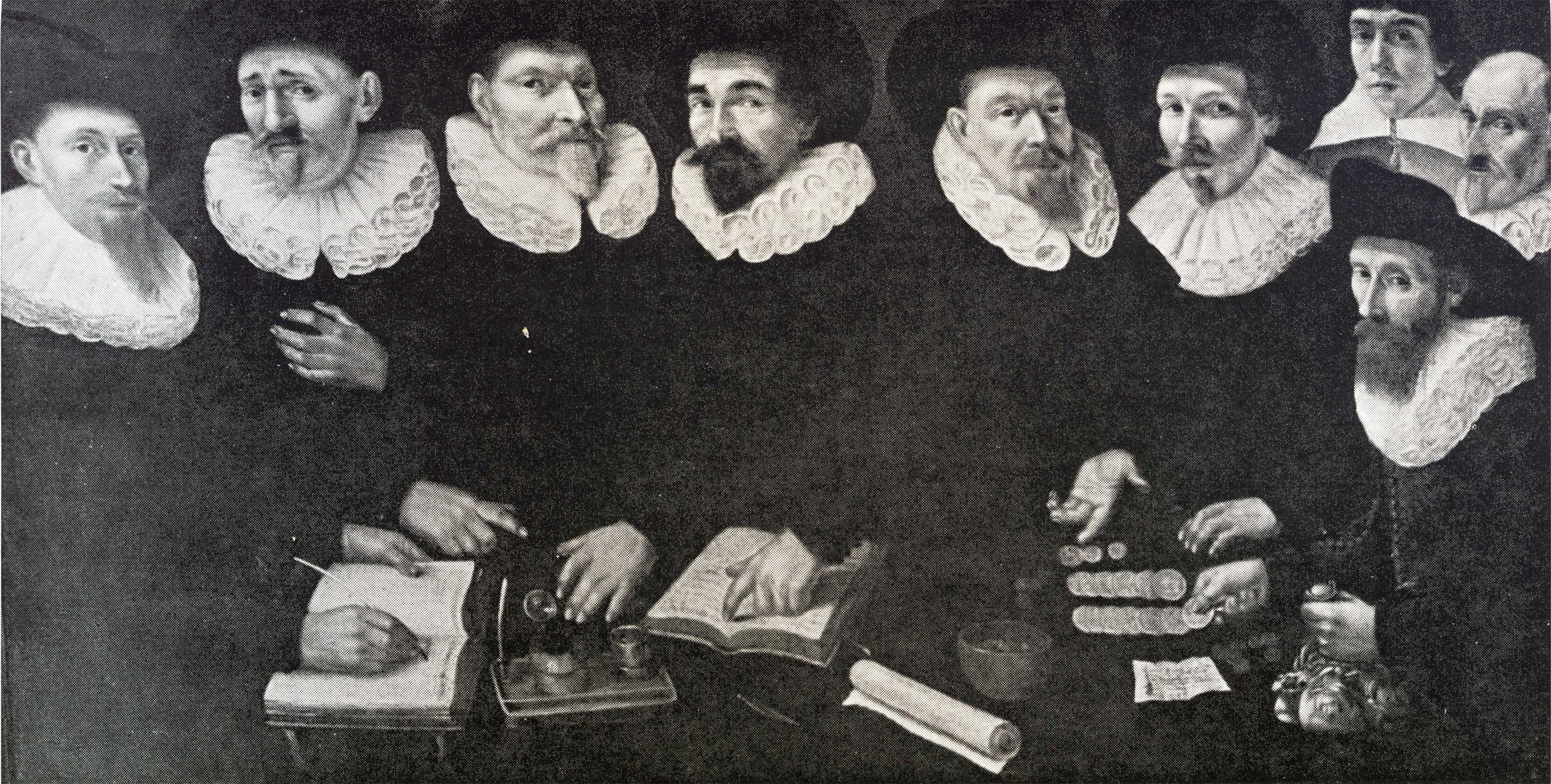
Regents of the orphanage of Gouda painted in 1636 by Jan Duif

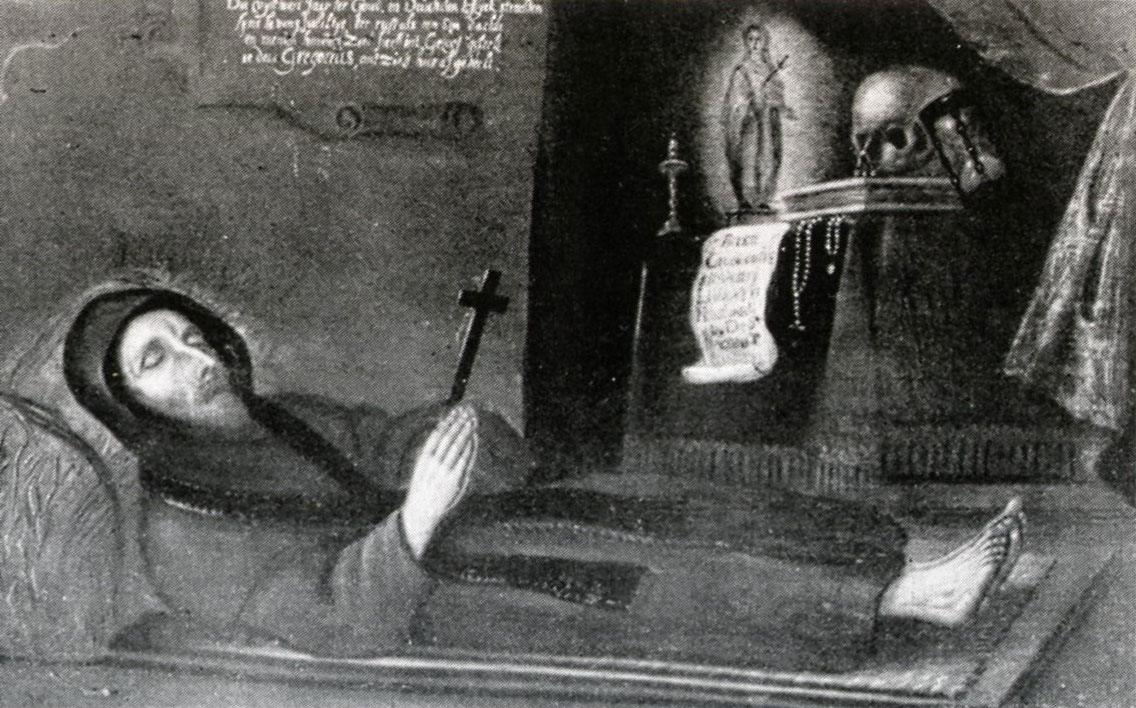
Gregorius Simpernel after his death painted by Jan Ariens Duif.
