= Reinier van Persijn =

17th century Dutch engraver

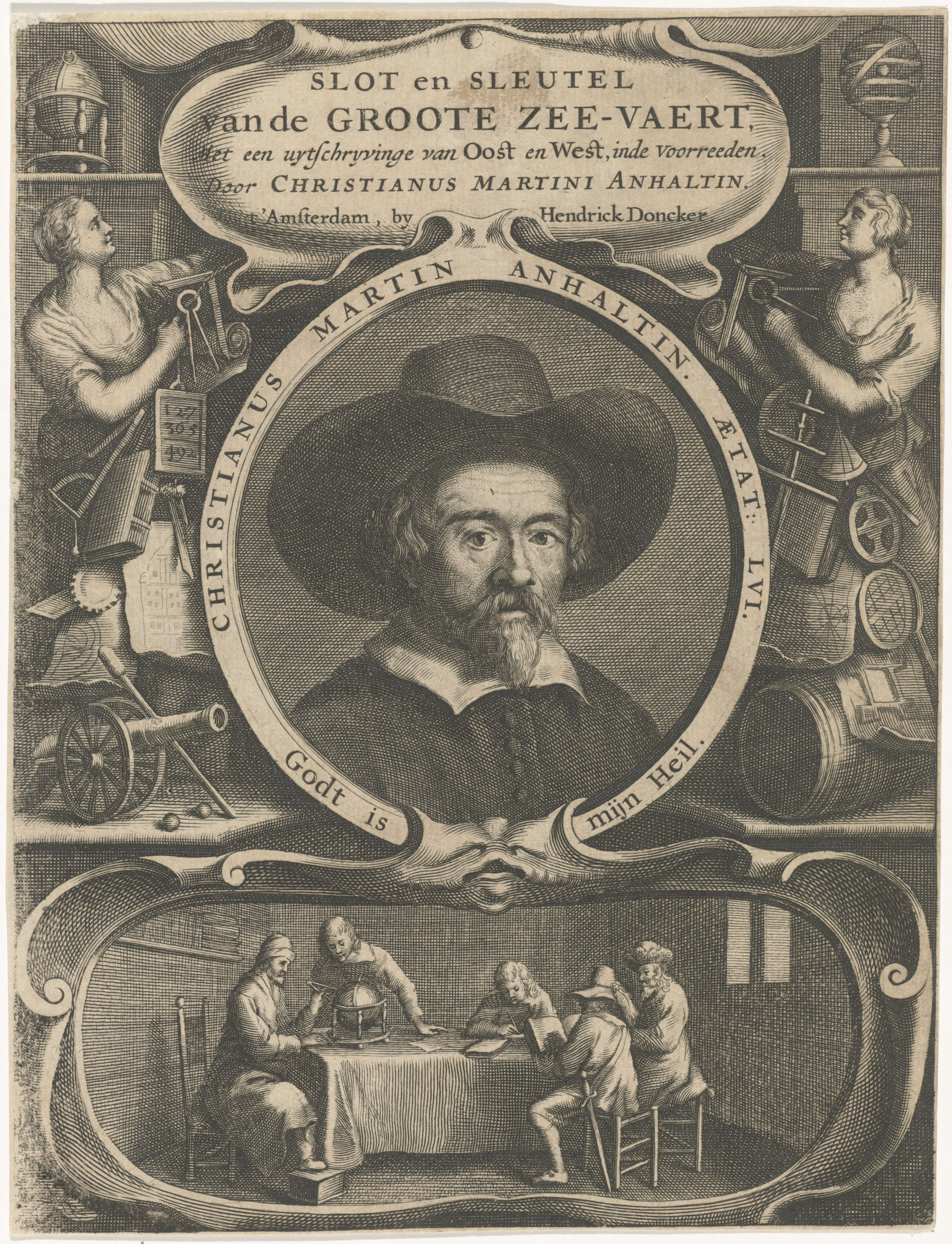
- Engraved title page by Reinier van Persijn, of the book by C.M. Anhaltin, Slot en sleutel van de groote zee-vaert met een uytschrijvinge van Oost en West, Amsterdam 1659
- Born: 1615; Alkmaar, Dutch Republic
- Died: November 23, 1668 (aged 52–53); Gouda, Dutch Republic
- Known for: Engraving
- Movement: Baroque

Reinier van Persijn, called Narcissus (1615 – 23 November 1668), was a Dutch Golden Age engraver of portraits and bookplates.

== Biography ==
A pupil of Theodor Matham and Cornelis Bloemaert, he traveled with them to Rome in 1633 to engrave the art collection belonging to Vincenzo Giustiniani, working under the direction of Joachim von Sandrart. In Rome, he joined the Bentvueghels and may have remained in the city after Sandrart returned to the Netherlands in 1637. By August 1642, he was in Amsterdam, where he married Elisabeth Dirks van Raemburgh, the granddaughter of the stained glass painter Wouter Crabeth I, whose son Wouter Crabeth II he probably knew from his time in Rome. In 1645, the couple settled in Gouda, where Elisabeth was born. During the 1640s, Persijn continued to collaborate with Sandrart, producing engravings based on the latter's drawings of Old Masters' paintings, including the Portrait of Baldassare Castiglione (after Raphael) and the Portrait of Ludovico Ariosto (after Titian).

Persijn also created engravings based on Sandrart's paintings. These included works for a series dedicated to the months of the year: July is represented by an allegorical figure of a woman harvesting, October by Bacchus drinking, and November by a hunter returning to his village with his catch. Persijn also produced thirteen engravings of animals based on drawings by Jacob Gerritsz. Cuyp, for the album Diversa Animalia Quadrupedia (1641); a six-sheet map of Zijpe; and various book frontispieces. The latter include the frontispiece for Cesare Ripa’s Iconologia (designed by Adriaen van Nieulandt for the Amsterdam edition, printed by Dirck Pietersz Pers in 1644) and the frontispiece for the Satires of Juvenal and Persius, annotated by Cornelis Schrevel (Leiden, 1648).

In 1646, Persijn engraved Saint Cecilia Distributing Her Clothing Among the Poor based on his own drawing of one of Domenichino's frescoes in the Polet Chapel of the Church of San Luigi dei Francesi in Rome. Some have suggested that Persijn created the drawing during a second trip to Italy, though if such a trip took place, it must have been brief. Following the death of his first wife in 1655, Persijn married Maria Crabeth, the daughter and heiress of the painter Wouter Crabeth II, on 26 April 1656 in Waddinxveen. He then took up residence in her house in Gouda. He died in Gouda on 23 November 1668. Aert van Waes was one of his disciples.

== Gallery ==
Allegory of the Barberini Family, engraved by Persijn after Andrea Camassei, Rijksmuseum, Amsterdam

Dune landscape with rabbits, from the series Diversa Animalia Quadrupedia, engraved by Persijn after Jacob Gerritsz. Cuyp, 1641, Rijksmuseum, Amsterdam

Title page for Johannes Schildius' edition of Suetonius' The Twelve Caesars, engraved by Persijn after Frans Hackaert, 1662, Rijksmuseum, Amsterdam

Title page for Cornelis Schrevel's Lexicon manuale Graeco-Latinum & Latino-Graecum, engraved by Persijn after Franciscus Hackius, 1660, Rijksmuseum, Amsterdam

== Bibliography ==
- "Persyn, Renier or Perseyn, Perzyn; called Narcissus". Benezit Dictionary of Artists. Oxford: Oxford University Press. 2011. doi:10.1093/benz/9780199773787.article.B00139368.
