= Jan Swart van Groningen =

Dutch painter (1490–1553)

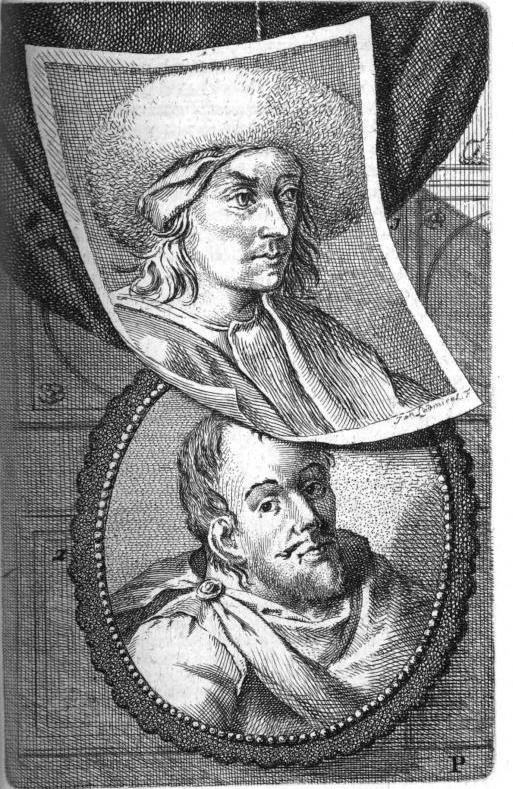
P154 P Jan Swart of Swart Jan - Jakob Janszen van Haarlem.jpg

Jan Swart van Groningen (c. 1495 in Groningen – c. 1563 in Antwerp), was a Dutch Renaissance painter.

== Biography ==
According to Karel van Mander he was in Gouda in 1522–1523, at the same time that Jan van Scorel was there, who had just returned from Italy. He could paint landscape and flesh tones in the manner of Scorel, and travelled to Italy himself, spending time in Venice. Van Mander goes on to mention his woodcuts of Turks on horses armed with bow and arrow, as well as a woodcut of Christ preaching a sermon with a crowd of listeners on board a ship. Adriaen Pietersz. Crabeth was his disciple who later surpassed him quite quickly in his art. This young Crabeth was the son of "Cripple Pieter" (Krepel Pieter).

According to the RKD he was the teacher of Adriaen Pietersz Crabeth in Gouda c. 1535, after which period he moved to Antwerp.
