= Dirk Crabeth =

Dutch artist (1501–1574)

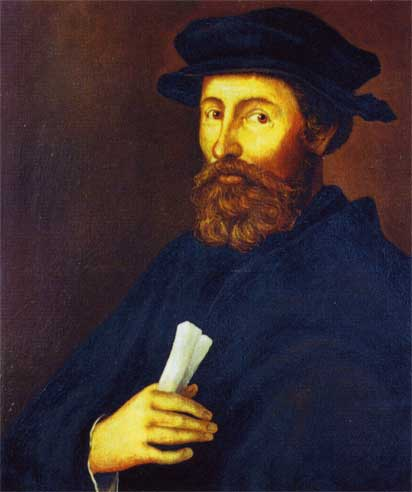
- Dirk Crabeth.
- Born: Dirk Crabeth; 1501; Gouda, Holland, Spain
- Died: 1574 (aged 72–73); Gouda, Holland, Spain
- Known for: Painting, Stained glass
- Movement: Renaissance

Dirk (or Dirck) Pietersz Crabeth (1501 – 1574) was a Dutch Renaissance glass painter, tapestry designer, and mapmaker. He was employed by the Janskerk (Gouda) during the 16th century, where he created eight of the stained glass windows during the years 1555–1571. His windows are one of the reasons that the church was placed on the UNESCO list of monuments.

== Biography ==
He and his talented brother Wouter Crabeth I were the sons of Pieter Dirckz of Gouda. They came from a painting family that was employed in the glass industry of Gouda. Archival evidence survives today showing orders of glass panes from various Netherlands towns. Dirk's fame began when he won a commission to make a glass pane for the Janskerk after the fire there in 1552. Dirk's first glass depicting St. John the Baptist baptising Jesus was installed in 1555.

In his designs, he appears to have been influenced by Jan van Scorel. Many of Crabeth's original cartoons for the windows of Janskerk have survived. In addition to painting and working with glass, he was a tapestry designer and mapmaker.

== Dirk's stained glass windows in the Janskerk of Gouda ==
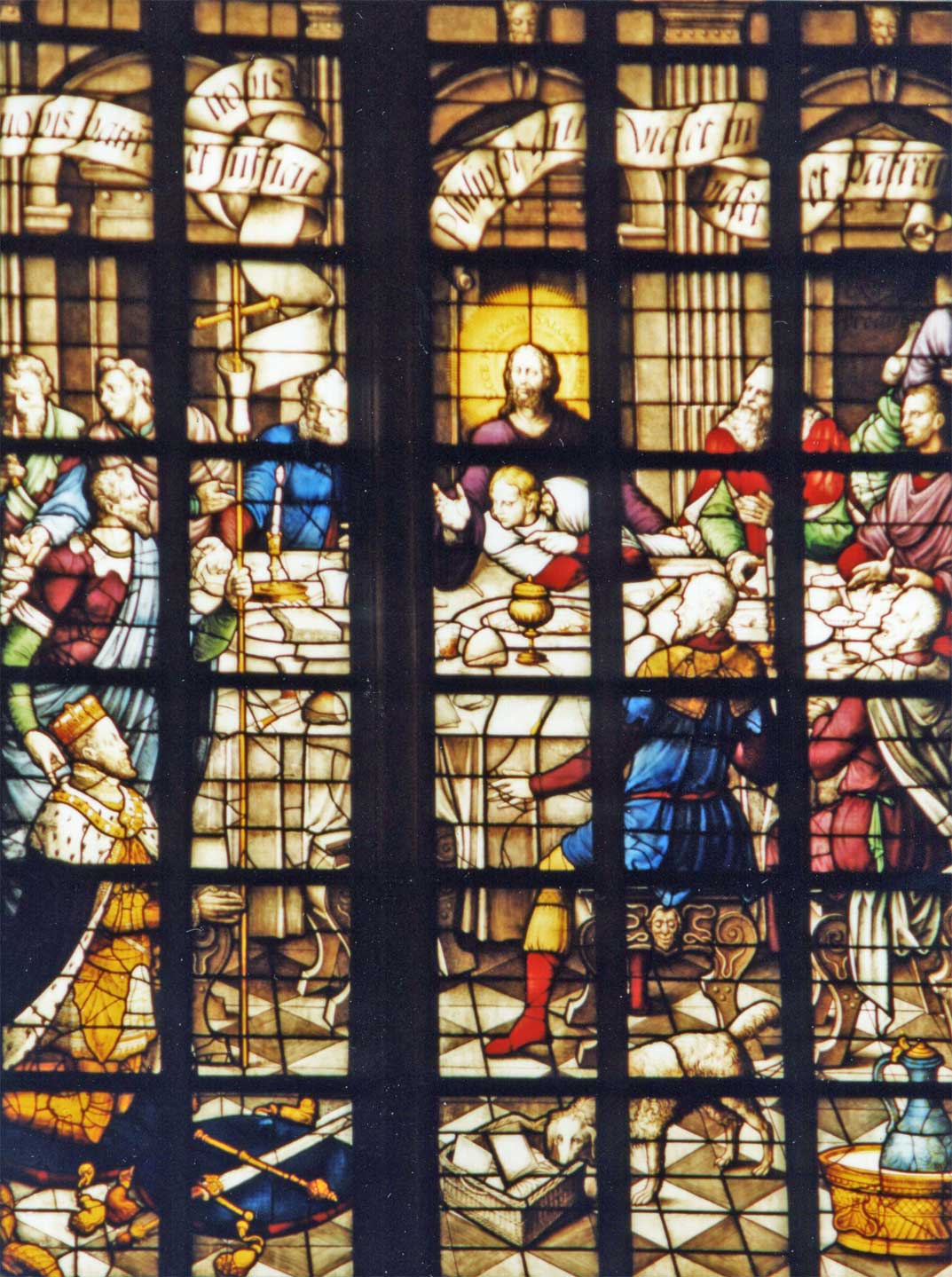
The Last Supper - glass 7 (middle detail) (1557)

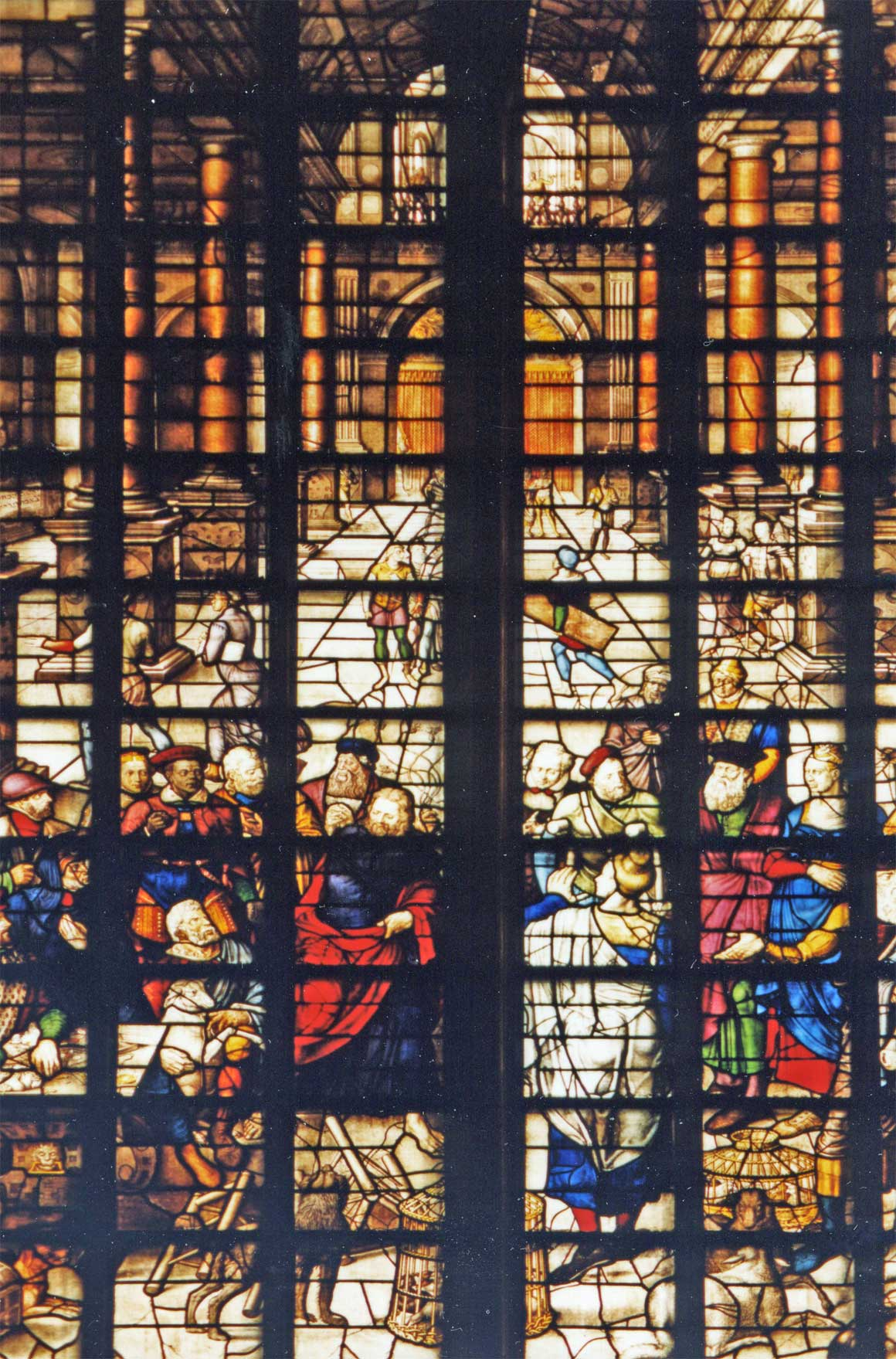
Jesus and the money changers - glass 22 (middle detail) (1557)

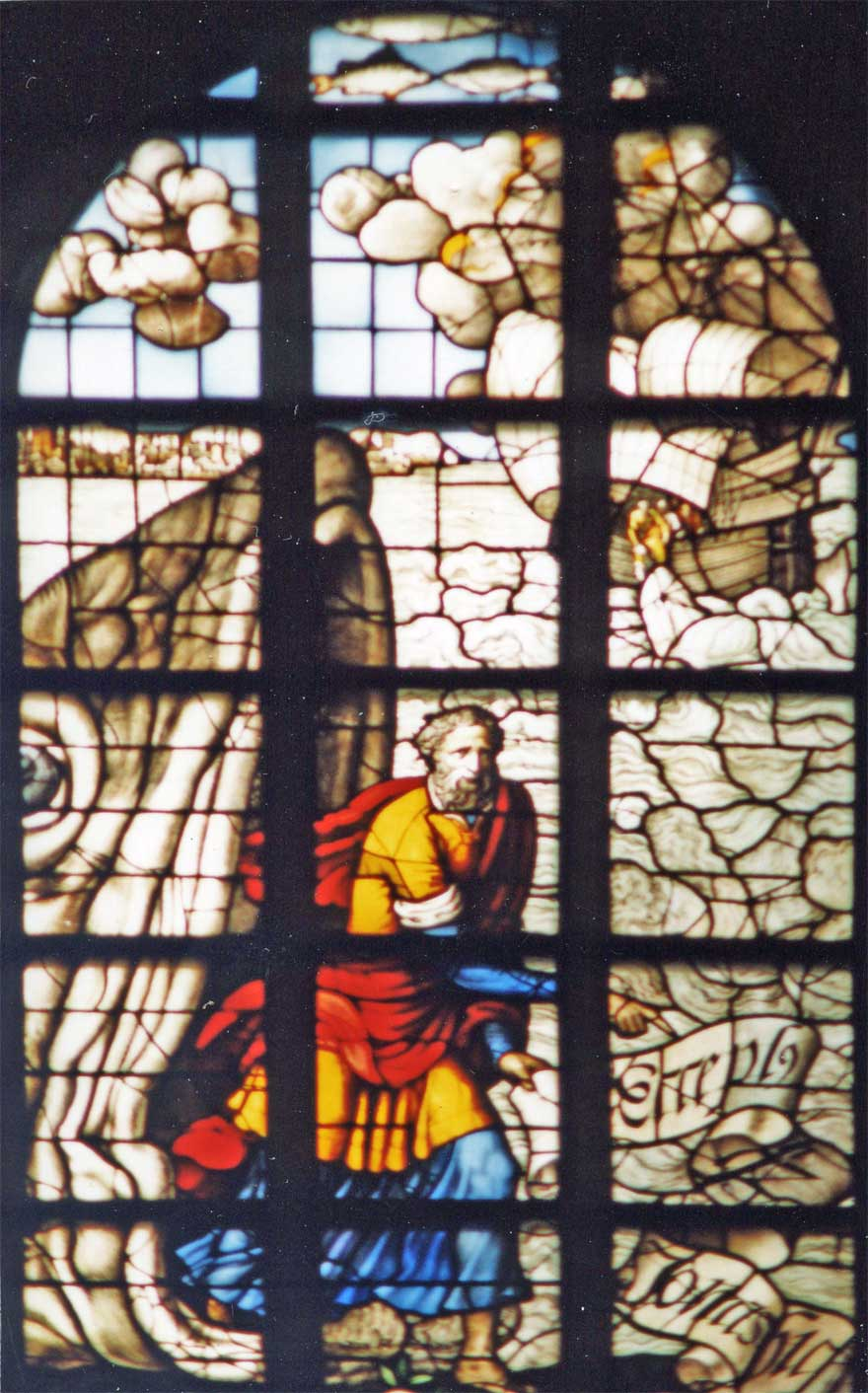
Jonah and the whale - glass 30 (ca.1565)

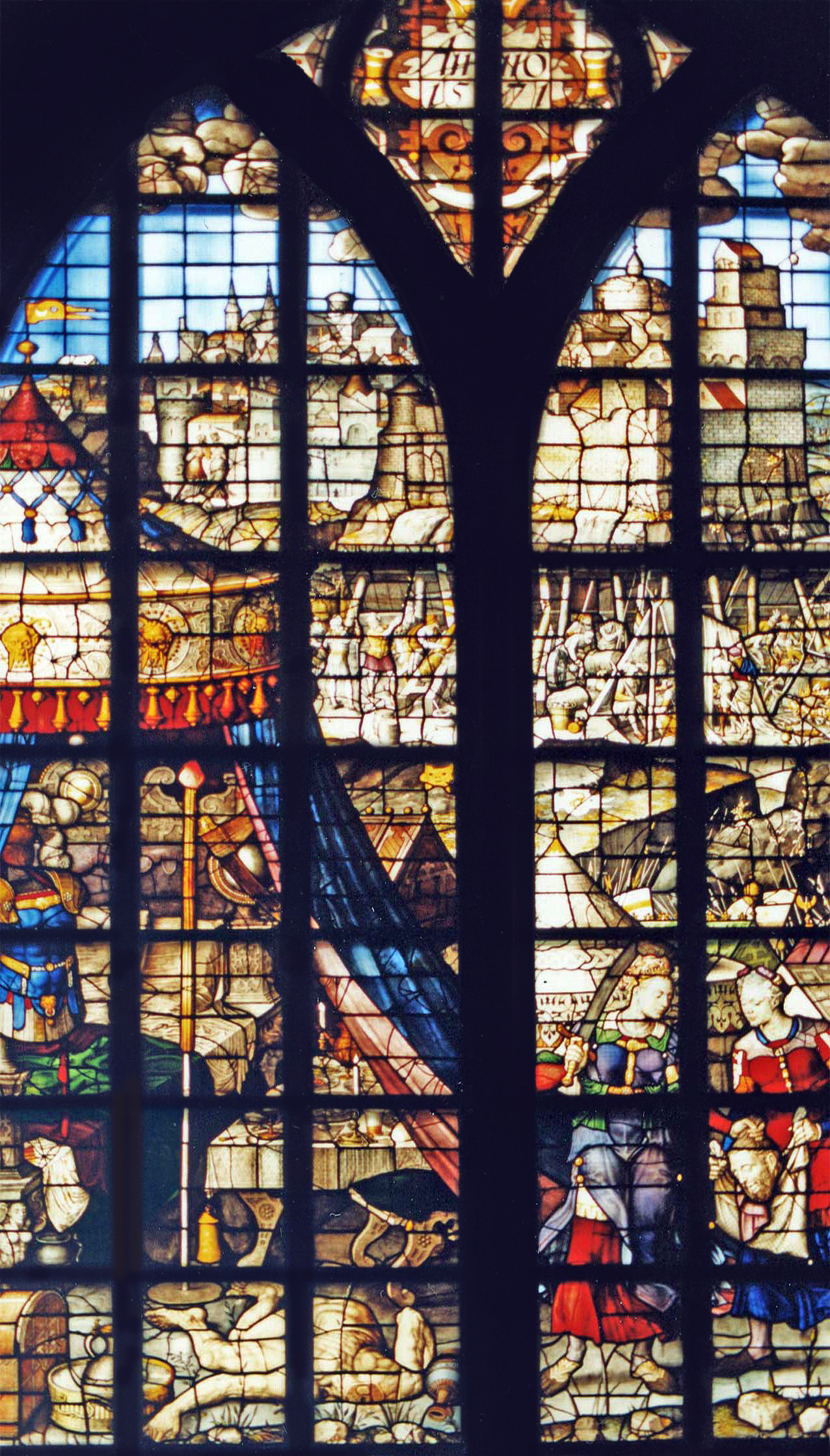
Judith with the head of Holofernes (1571)

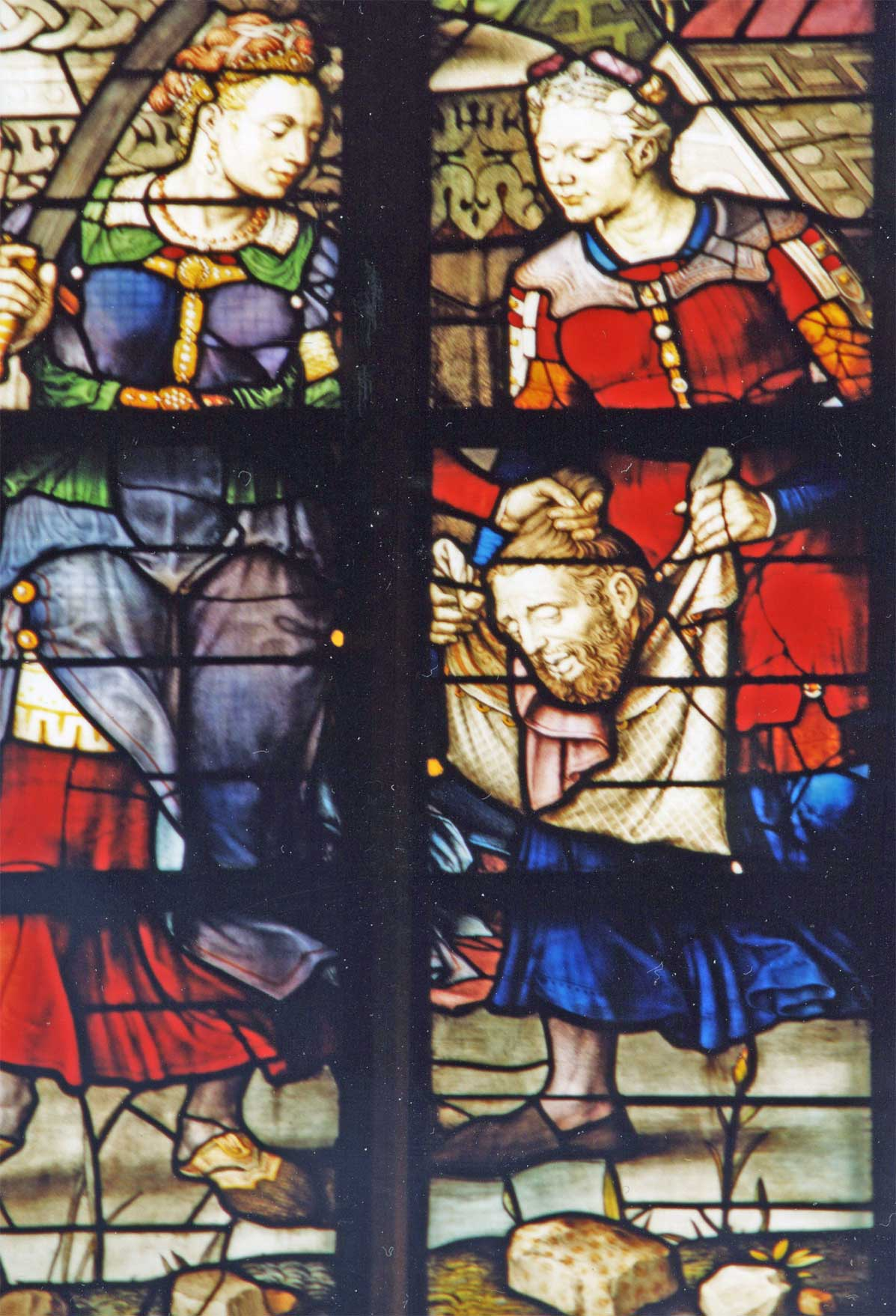
Detail of Judith and her maid

== Legacy ==
The stained glass windows of Gouda are famous, but this is not only for their beauty. It remains a mystery today why these stained glass windows survived the Beeldenstorm and why Dirk and his brother were allowed to continue their work after the changeover from a Catholic church to a Protestant one. The church has windows from both of the enemies, Philip II of Spain and William the Silent. Dirk Crabeth also made 7 windows for the chapel of an order of monks from Stein, South Holland, noted as the Augustinian monastery where Erasmus went to school. When their monastery in Steyn burned in 1549, they moved to a former convent in Gouda in 1551. There, they ordered windows for the restoration of the chapel of that convent. These windows were rescued during the iconoclastic fury, and when the convent complex was torn down in 1580, the windows were temporarily installed afterwards in the Janskerk church. In a painting from 1734, this situation can still be seen. Much later still, they were installed in a specially built van der Vorm chapel in the St Janskerk, donated by Willem van der Vorm, the wealthy founder of the Holland America Line, in 1934.

Houbraken wrote two pages about the brothers Dirk and Wouter Crabeth in his Schouburg (1718), since he was surprised they were overlooked in Karel van Mander's Schilder-boeck, which only mentioned their brother Adriaen Pietersz Crabeth. In his biographical sketch, he wrote that Gouda had a busy glass painting industry that spanned several generations.

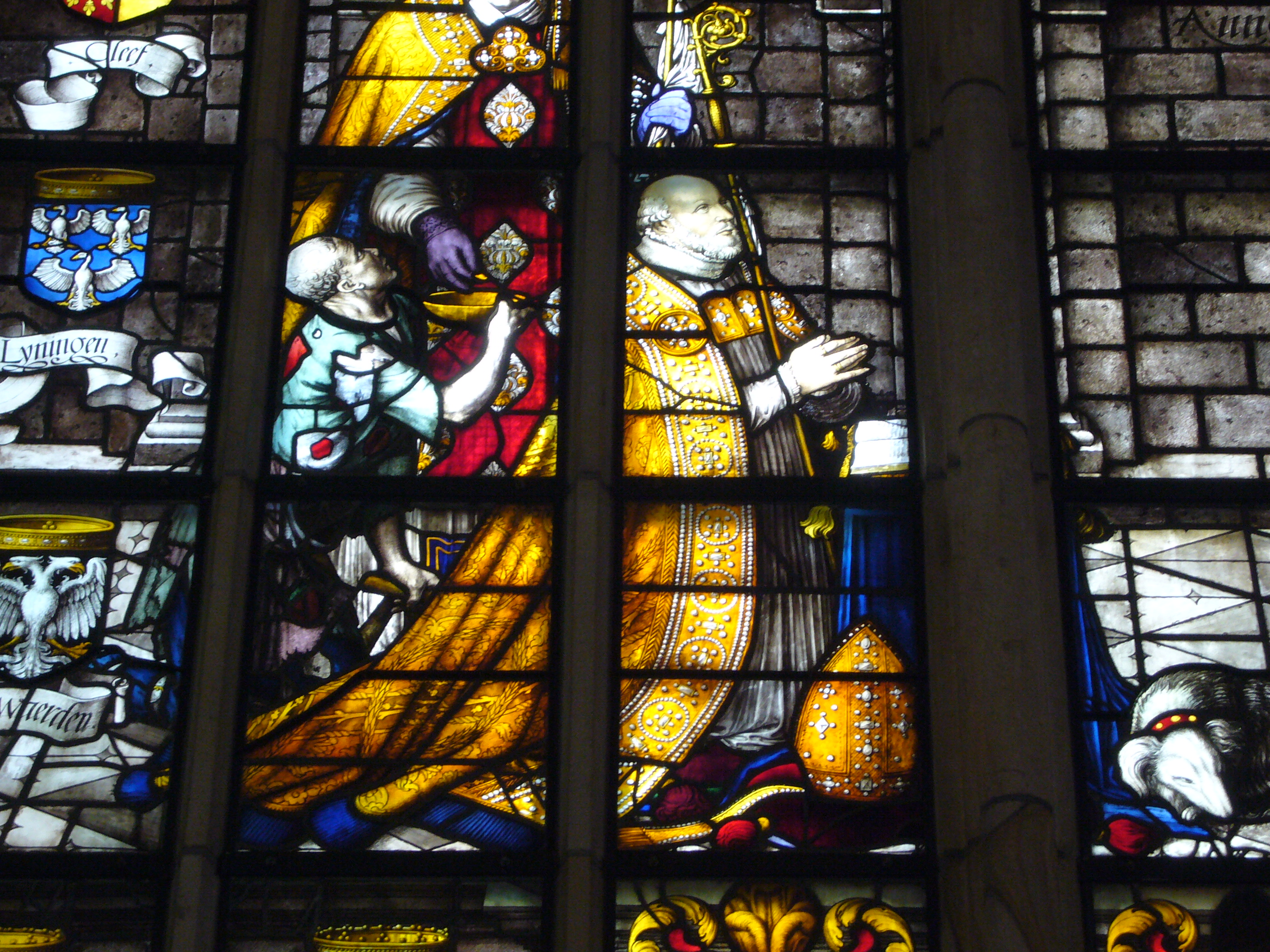
The first window (lower detail) with donor George van Egmond (1555)

== See also ==
- Stained glass
- Medieval stained glass
- Arnold of Nijmegen
- Wouter Crabeth I
- Wouter Crabeth II
