= Vrijhoef en Kalverbroek =

Municipality in South Holland

Coordinates: 52°1′21″N 4°45′0″E

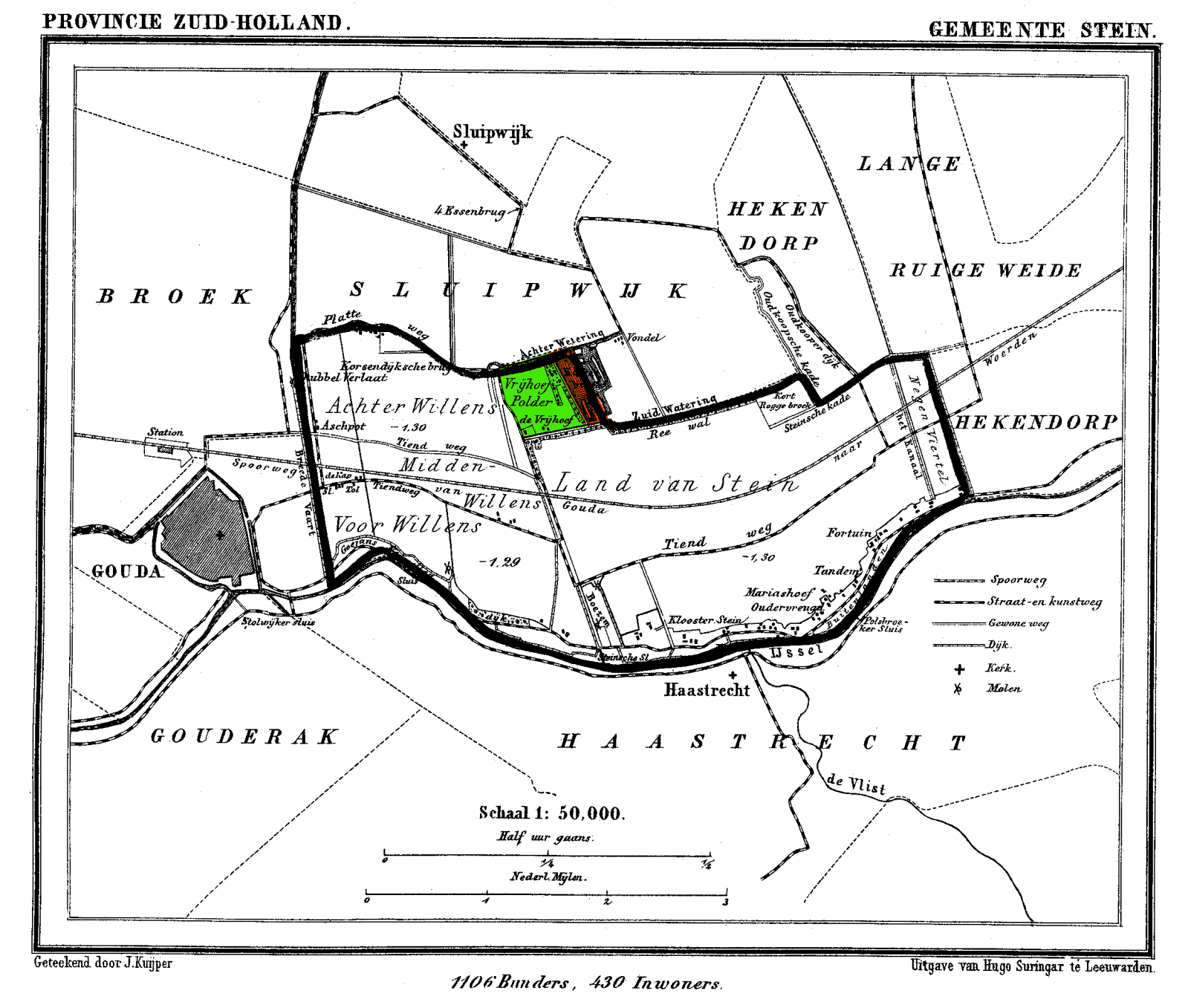
Municipality of Stein in 1868; highlighted: Vrijhoef (green) and Kalverbroek (red).

Vrijhoef en Kalverbroek is a former heerlijkheid (manor) and municipality in the Dutch province of South Holland. It was located about 3 km east of the city of Gouda, in the current municipality of Reeuwijk. The area of the former municipality is now almost completely covered by the lakes of the Reeuwijksche Plassen.

According to the 19th-century historian A.J. van der Aa, the hamlets of Vrijhoef and Kalverbroek (or Kalverenbroek) originally were two separate small manors, but they were merged into one. The manor was property of the nearby city of Gouda between 1438 and 1848.

Between 1811 and 1817, the heerlijkheid became part of the municipality of Stein; after that, it was a separate municipality until January 1, 1827, when it again was merged with Stein. In 1822, the municipality had 47 inhabitants; around the middle of the 19th century, this had fallen to 24 inhabitants (7 of which in Kalverbroek), in an area of 0.52 km^{2} (0.20 sq mi).

Nowadays, most of the area is covered by two lakes: lake "Vrijhoef" and lake "Kalverbroek". Both lakes are much larger than the heerlijkheid they are named after.
