= Adriaen Pietersz Crabeth =

Adriaen Pietersz Crabeth (1510 —1553) was a Renaissance glass painter from the Habsburg Netherlands.

== Life ==
Crabeth was born in Gouda. According to Karel van Mander, he had been the pupil of the glass painter Jan Swart van Groningen. He took his name from his father "Krepel Pieter" (English: "Cripple Peter"), and though he was a good student who quickly outshone his master, he died young in Autun after being there a short while during a tour of France.

According to the RKD he was the son of Pieter Dirksz Crabeth, and the brother of the Gouda glass painters Wouter and Dirk Crabeth. He became a pupil of Jan Swart of Groningen, but died relatively young, at Autun.
