= Aert van Waes =

Dutch Golden Age painter

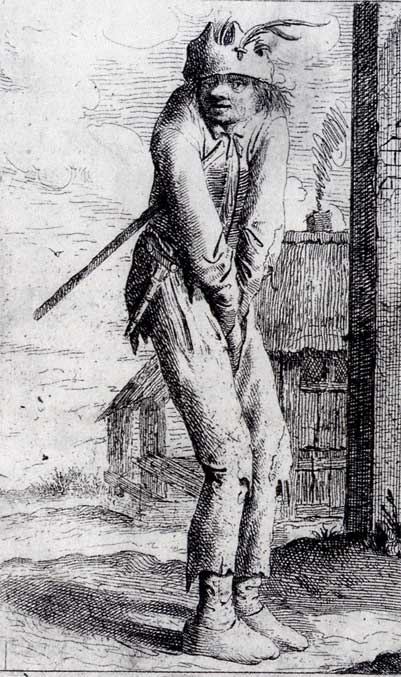
- Vagabond, c. 1645.
- Born: Aert van Waes c. 1620; Gouda
- Died: January 1, 1675 (aged 55); Gouda
- Known for: Painting
- Movement: Baroque

Aert van Waes, or Aert de Waes (c. 1620 in Gouda – c. 1675), was a Dutch Golden Age painter of the Baroque period.

== Biography ==
He was a student of Wouter Crabeth II, Reinier van Persijn and David Teniers the Younger, and though he lived and worked in Gouda, he travelled in France and Italy to finish his training., According to Houbraken, he learned etching from Reinier van Persijn, and was a good draftsman. He was a friend of Jan Govertsz Verbyl, who he had accompanied on his travels. Houbraken claimed that after their return to Gouda, they both died in 1649 of the same sudden sickness. The RKD disagrees, and estimates his death between the years 1664–1684.
