= Stein, South Holland =

Stein
- Village
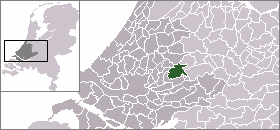

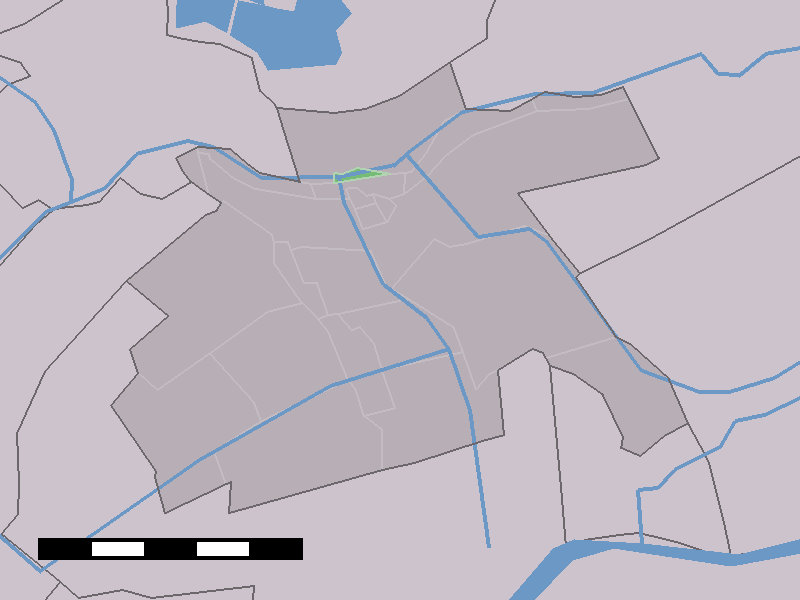
- The village (dark green) and the statistical district (light green) of Stein in the former municipality of Vlist.
- Coordinates: 52°0′10″N 4°46′30″E
- Country: Netherlands
- Province: South Holland
- Municipality: Krimpenerwaard

Population (January 1, 2005)
  - Total: 1,060
- Time zone: UTC+1 (CET)
  - Summer (DST): UTC+2 (CEST)

Stein (Dutch pronunciation: [ˈstɛin]) is a small village in the Dutch province of South Holland. It is a part of the municipality of Krimpenerwaard, and lies about 5 km east of Gouda.

The statistical area "Stein", which can also include the surrounding countryside, has a population of around 1060.

Stein was a separate municipality between 1817 and 1870, known as Land van Stein, when it became part of Reeuwijk. The former municipality of Vrijhoef en Kalverbroek was added to Land van Stein in 1827. The part of the former municipality that lay north of the railway line from Gouda to Woerden still is part of that municipality; the southern part belonged to Haastrecht, and since 1985 to Vlist (till 2015).
