= Wouter Crabeth I =

Dutch glass painter (1510–1590)

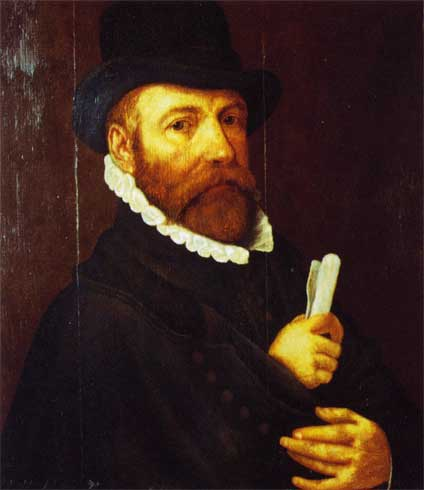
- Born: Wouter Crabeth ca.1510 Gouda
- Died: 1590 (aged 79–80); Gouda
- Known for: Painting, Stained glass
- Movement: Renaissance

Wouter Pietersz Crabeth (1510–1590) was a Dutch Renaissance glass painter. He was employed by the Sint Janskerk (Gouda) during the Protestant Reformation, where he created six of the stained glass windows during the years 1555 to 1571. His windows, that he created in close collaboration with his brother Dirk Crabeth, are one of the reasons that the church was placed on the UNESCO list of monuments.

== Biography ==
He and his brother Dirk were the sons of Pieter Dirckz of Gouda. They came from a painting family that was employed in the stained glass industry of Gouda. Archival evidence survives today showing orders of glass panes from various Netherlands towns. Wouter's fame began when his brother became head builder in charge at the Janskerk, and he was hired to help with the window design for an ambitious series of windows depicting the life of St. John the Baptist. Wouter probably assisted his brother from 1555 onwards, but he only signed his own work after he took a trip to Italy, which made him a master painter in his own right. His paintings show better skill at perspective, and he often included architectural backgrounds that accentuated this. According to Houbraken, his work gave the viewer the impression of height, while Dirk's work gave the impression of depth.

His brother had no children, but Wouter had at least one son named Pieter, who became a mayor of Gouda. He in turn had a son, also named Wouter Pietersz, who became a painter like his namesake. This grandson Wouter Crabeth II also travelled to Italy, like his grandfather did before him. He also had a granddaughter by his son Pieter, named Maria Crabeth, who later married Reinier van Persijn, the painter and engraver from Alkmaar. He would die in 1590 from tuberculosis.

== Wouter's stained glass windows in the Sint Janskerk of Gouda and Museum Gouda ==
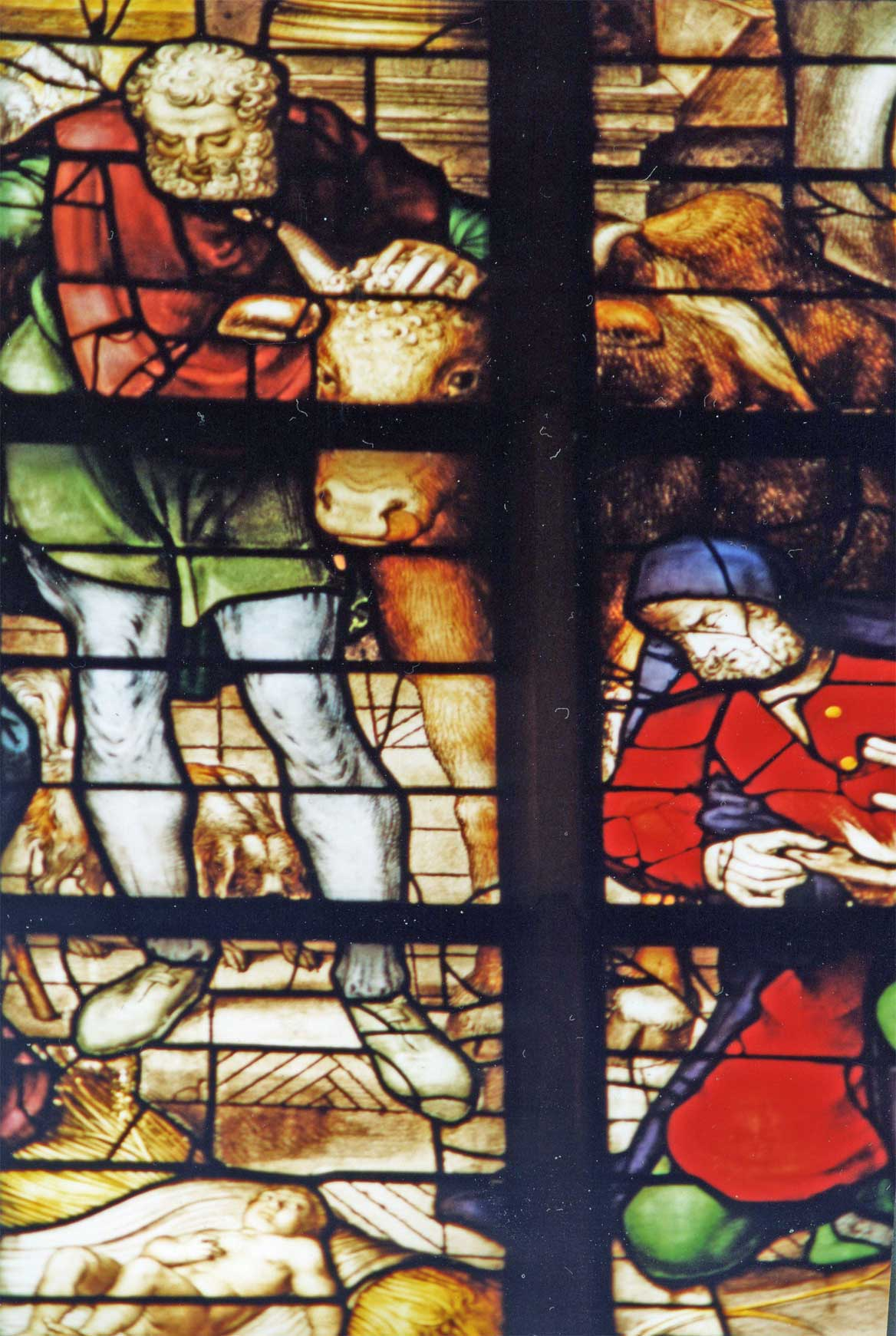
Nativity scene (birth of Christ)

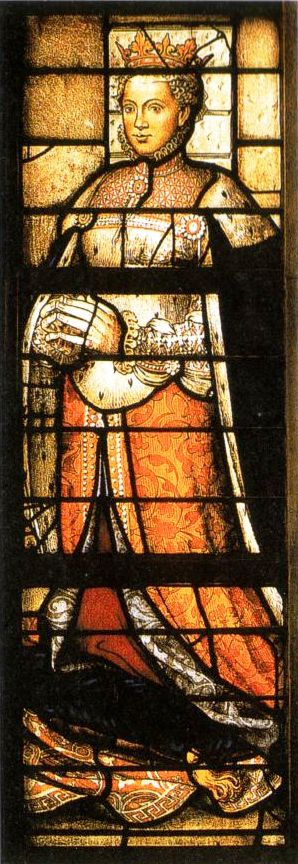
Margaret of Parma

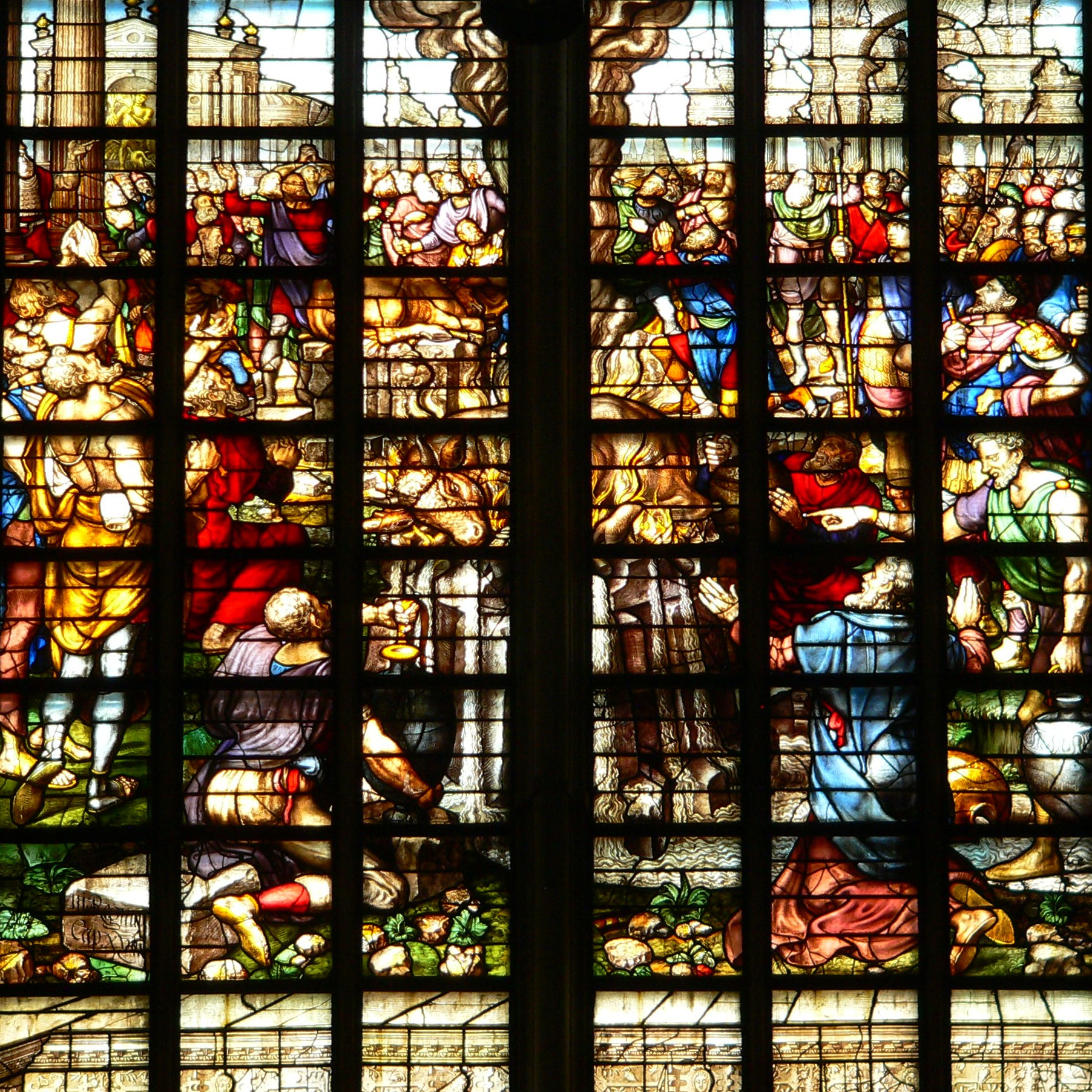
glass 23 Elijah's sacrifice on Mount Carmel

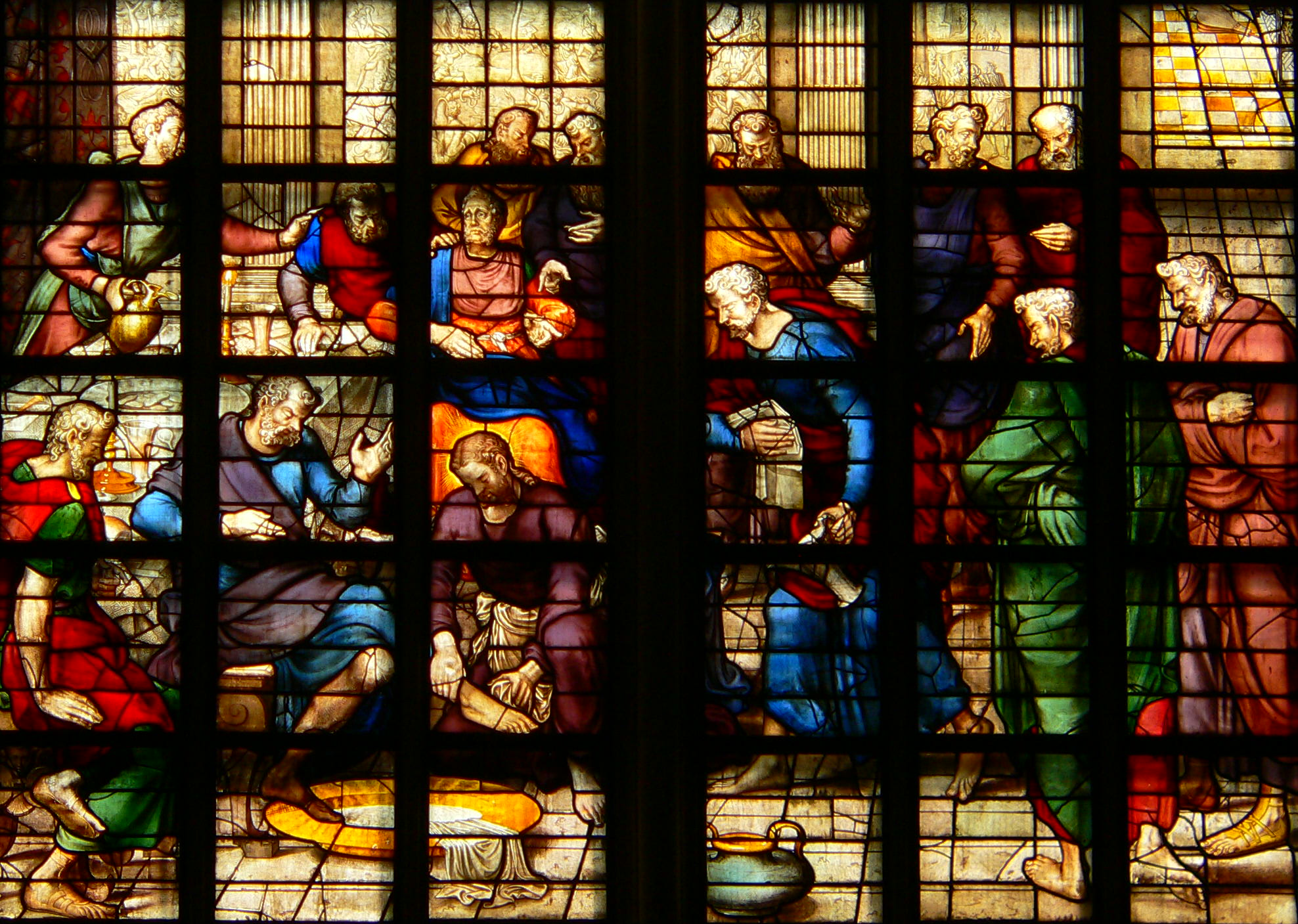
glass 23 Jesus washing the feet of the disciples

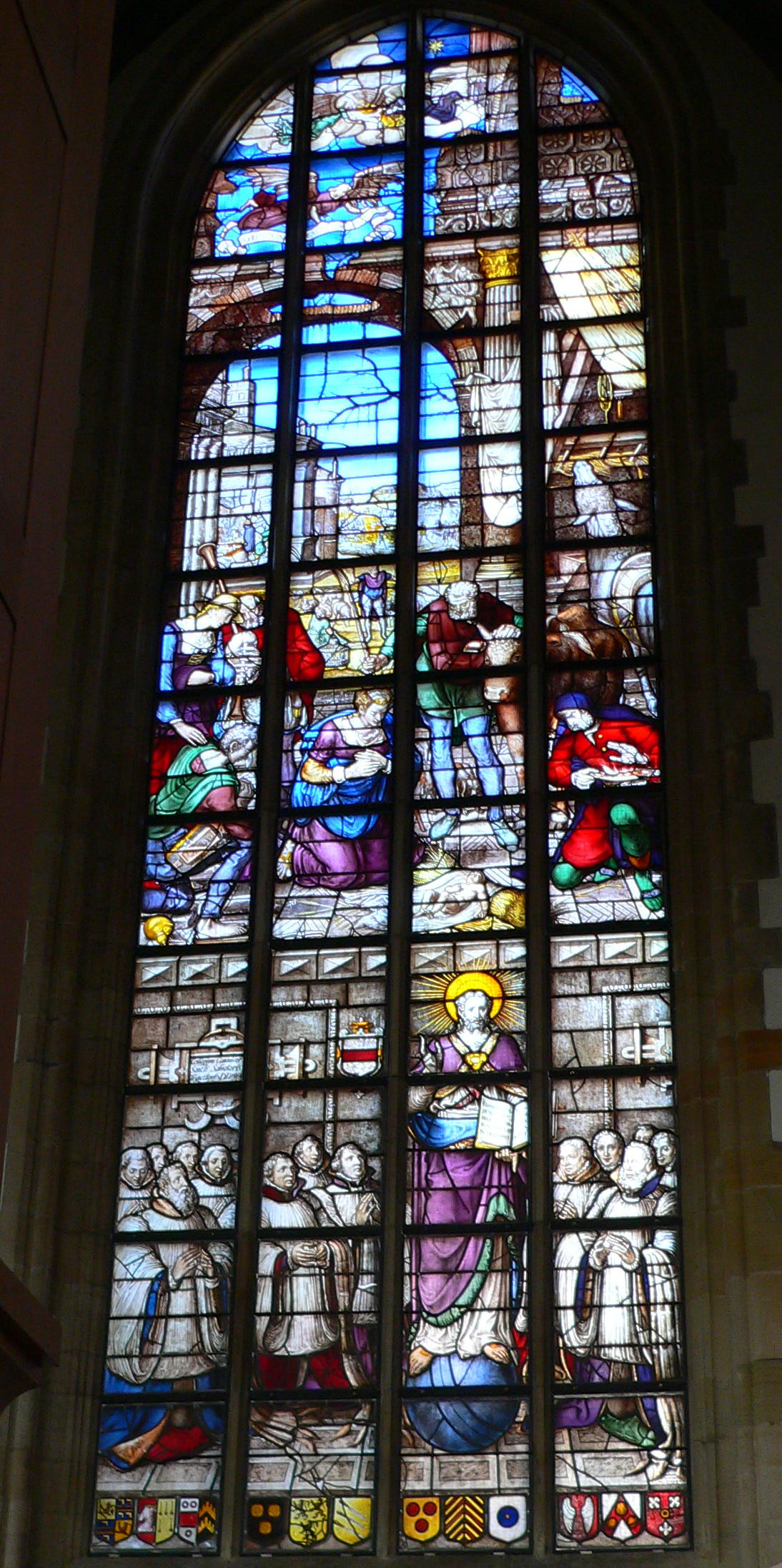
The adoration of the shepherds

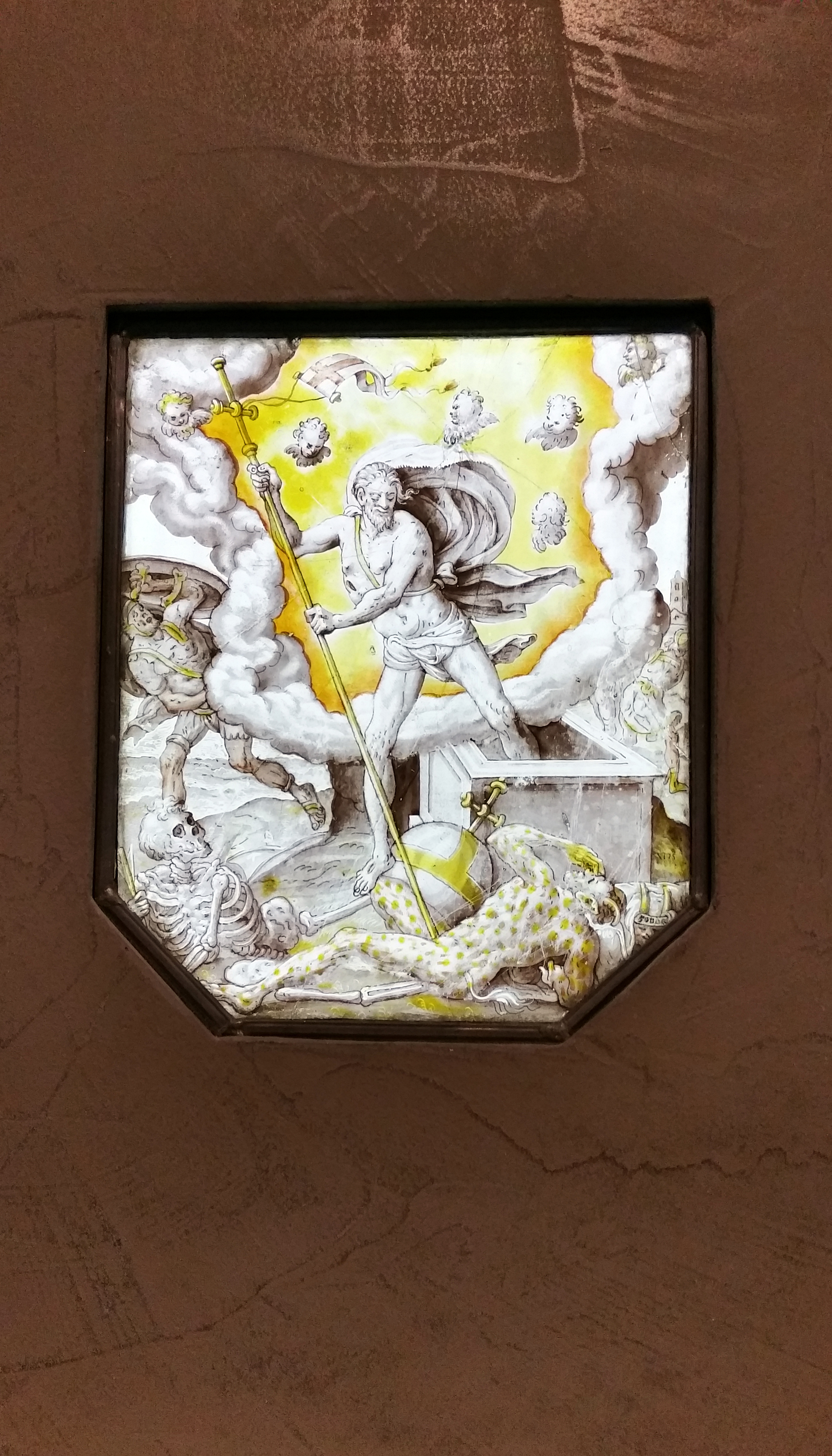
Museum Gouda. Resurrecting Christ triumphs over death, sin and evil 1560–1570

== Legacy ==
The stained glass windows of Gouda are famous, but this is not only for their beauty. It remains a mystery today why these stained glass windows survived the Beeldenstorm and why Wouter and his brother were allowed to continue their work after the changeover from a Catholic church to a Protestant one. The church has windows from both of the enemies Philip II of Spain and William the Silent.

Houbraken wrote two pages about the brothers Dirk and Wouter Crabeth in his Schouburgh (1718), since he was surprised they were overlooked in Karel van Mander's Schilder-boeck, who only mentioned their brother Adriaen Pietersz Crabeth. Van Mander also mentioned that the father of this Adriaen was called Krepel Pieter and that he died in Autun (known then for its stained glass windows in the Cathedral) after travelling for a long time in France.
