= Wouter Crabeth II =

Dutch painter

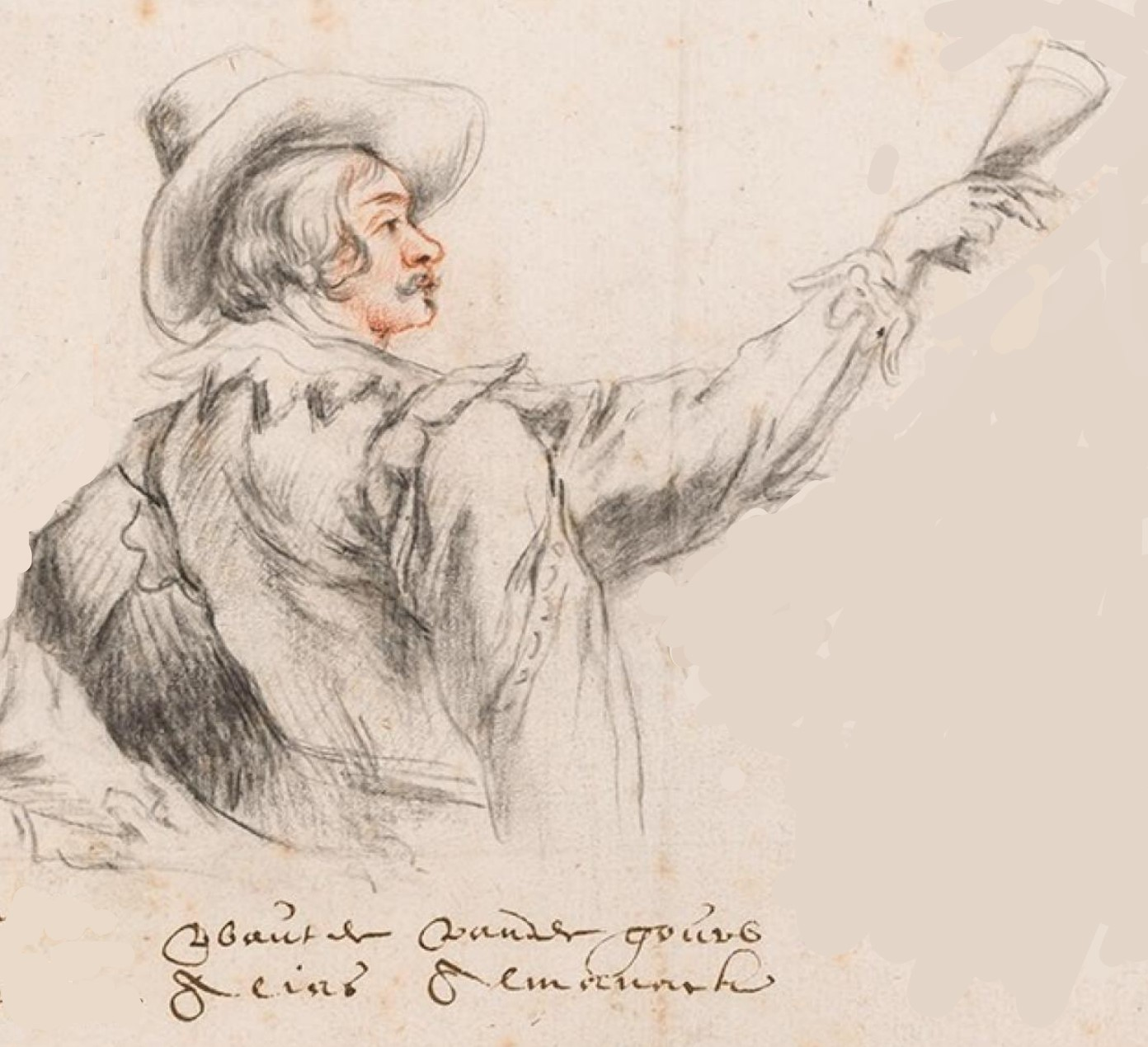
- Wouter Crabeth
- Born: 1594; Gouda
- Died: 18 June 1644 (aged 49–50); Gouda
- Education: Cornelis Ketel
- Known for: Painting

Wouter Pietersz. Crabeth II (1594 – c. 18 June 1644) was a Dutch painter and draughtsman known for his genre scenes, biblical subjects and occasional portraits. During a long-time residence in Italy his work was influenced by the style of Caravaggio and his followers, the so-called Caravaggisti.

== Biography ==
Wouter Crabeth was born in Gouda in 1594, the son of the writer and politician Pieter Woutersz. Crabeth and Maria de Jonge. He was named after his grandfather Wouter Crabeth I, a renowned stained glass artist. Crabeth probably trained with Cornelis Ketel, a native of Gouda who was a successful portrait painter in Amsterdam. It is possible that Crabeth was also a pupil of Abraham Bloemaert in Utrecht.

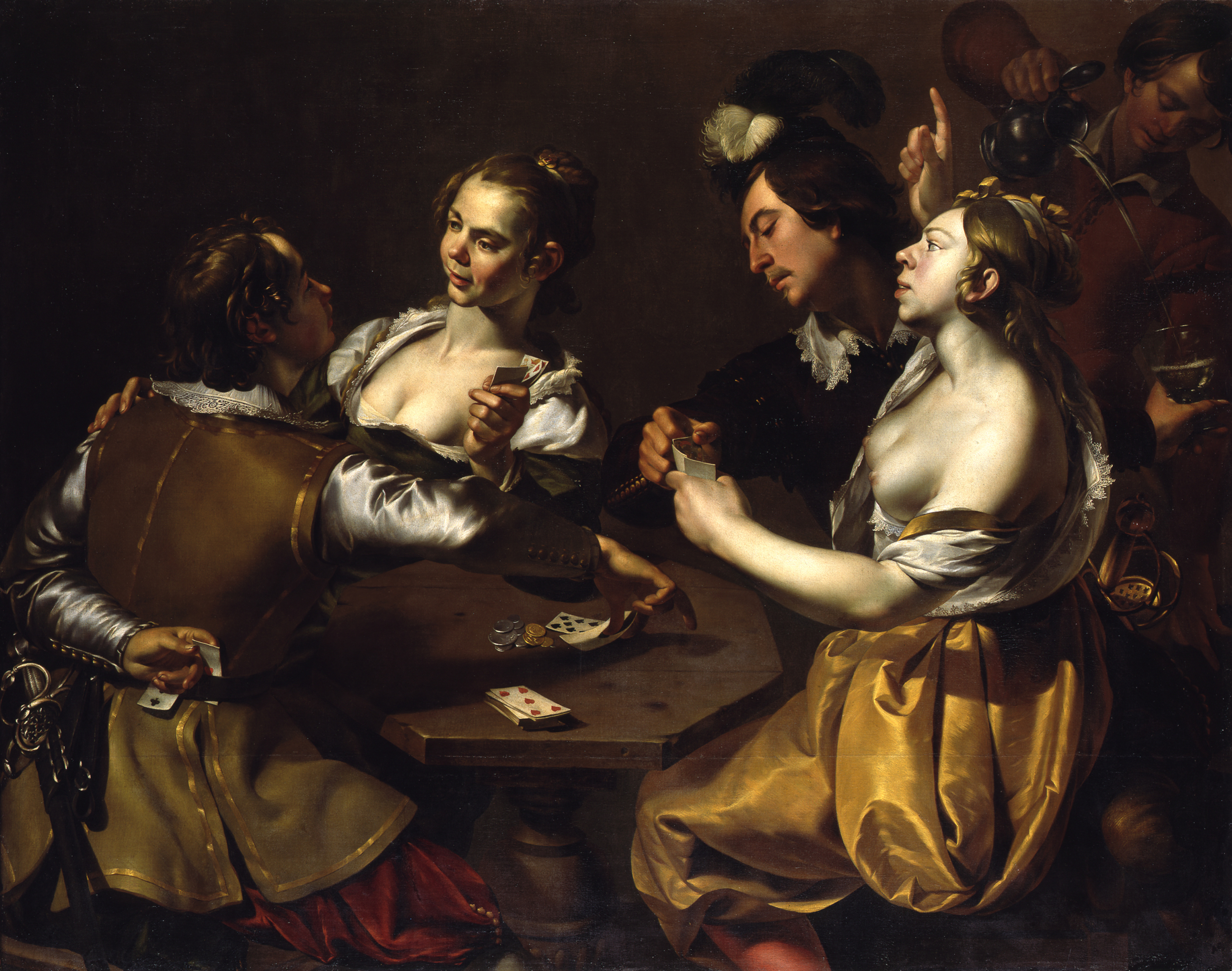
The Cardsharps, 1626/44 (Gemäldegalerie, Berlin)

In 1613 Crabeth set out on a trip to Italy. Such a trip, usually tour, ending in Florence and/or Rome was at the time deemed a necessary rite of passage for Dutch or Flemish artists seeking to complete their classical education, ever since Karel van Mander's Schilder-boeck was published in 1604. He was in Paris in 1615. The next year he travelled to Aix-en-Provence in the company of Leonaert Bramer and possibly Jan Gerritsz. van Heemskerck. From there he continued to Italy, where he studied the local masterpieces and worked at various painting schools and workshops.

In 1619, while in Rome, he founded with other painters such as Cornelius van Poelenburgh, Bartholomeus Breenbergh, Wybrand de Geest and Leonard Bramer the so-called Bentvueghels, an association of mainly Dutch and Flemish artists working in Rome. It was customary for the Bentvueghels to adopt an appealing nickname, the so-called 'bent name'. Crabeth was given the bent name "Almanack" (Almanac). Crabeth appears in an anonymous drawing depicting some members of the Bentvueghels dated 1620 (Museum Boijmans Van Beuningen in Rotterdam).

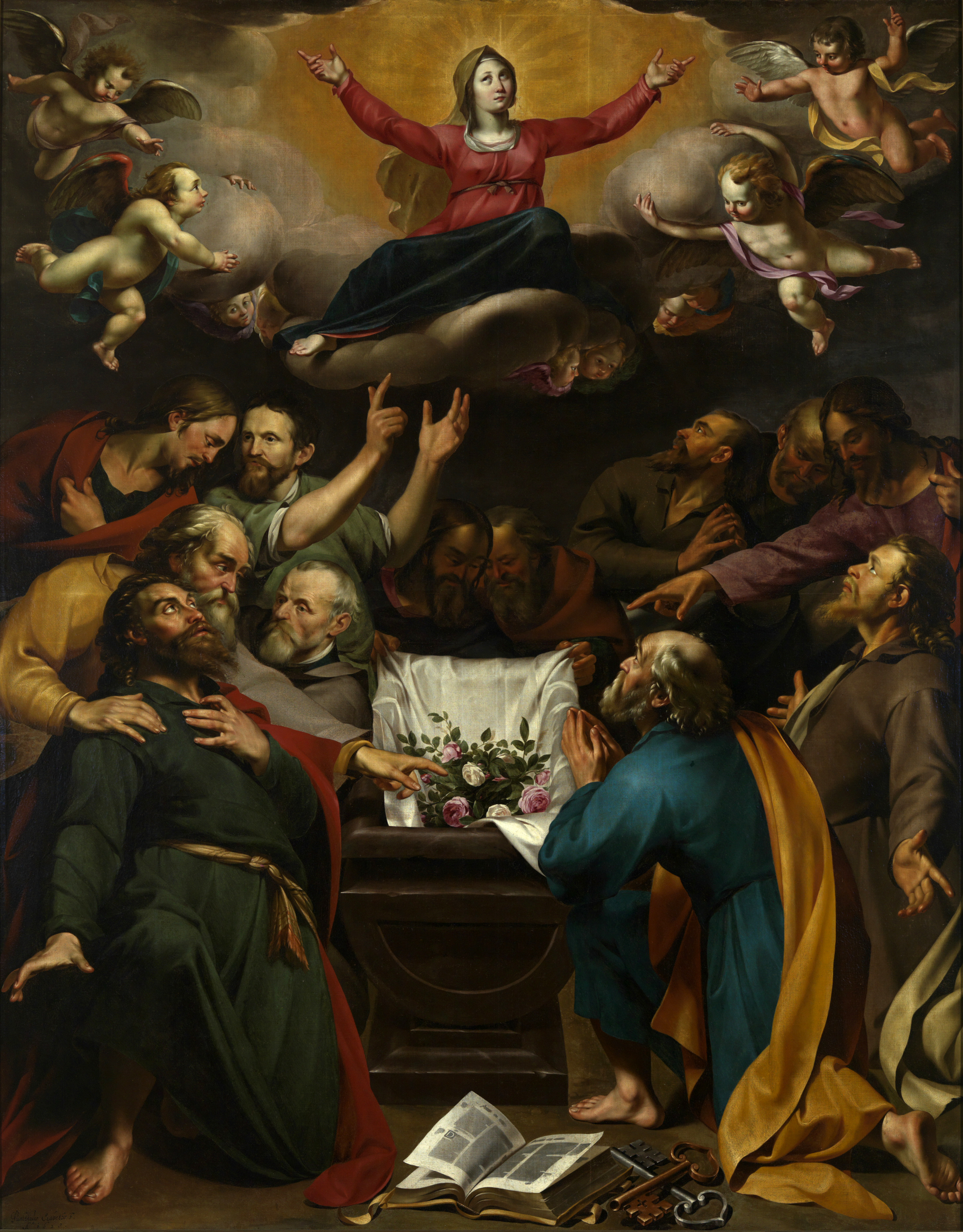
The Assumption of the Virgin Mary, 1628 (nl:Museum Gouda, Gouda)

In 1626, he returned to Gouda. His first commissions came from pastor Petrus Purmerent who asked him to paint two altarpieces for the clandestine Catholic Church of Saint John the Baptist (later called the Old Catholic Church) and the Catharina Gasthuis, a religious community. These two paintings are currently in the collections of respectively the nl:Museum Gouda (nl:Museum Het Catharina Gasthuis) in Gouda and the Rijksmuseum of Amsterdam. The two works – The Assumption of the Virgin Mary and Doubting Thomas – show a strong Italian influence, and are stylistically close to Caravaggio. Crabeth himself was probably not a Catholic, but a Remonstrant.

In 1626, he became a member of the Gouda civil militia (called in Dutch schutterij). Such civil militia was made up of volunteers who received military training in order to protect their town. In 1628, he married Adriana Gerritsdr Vroesen, daughter of the then mayor of Gouda. Later that year, his own father became mayor. He was named captain of the local civil militia in the same year. He retained this position until his death in 1644. In 1629 he participated as a captain of the militia in the Siege of 's-Hertogenbosch of 1629, an important military victory of the Dutch Republic.

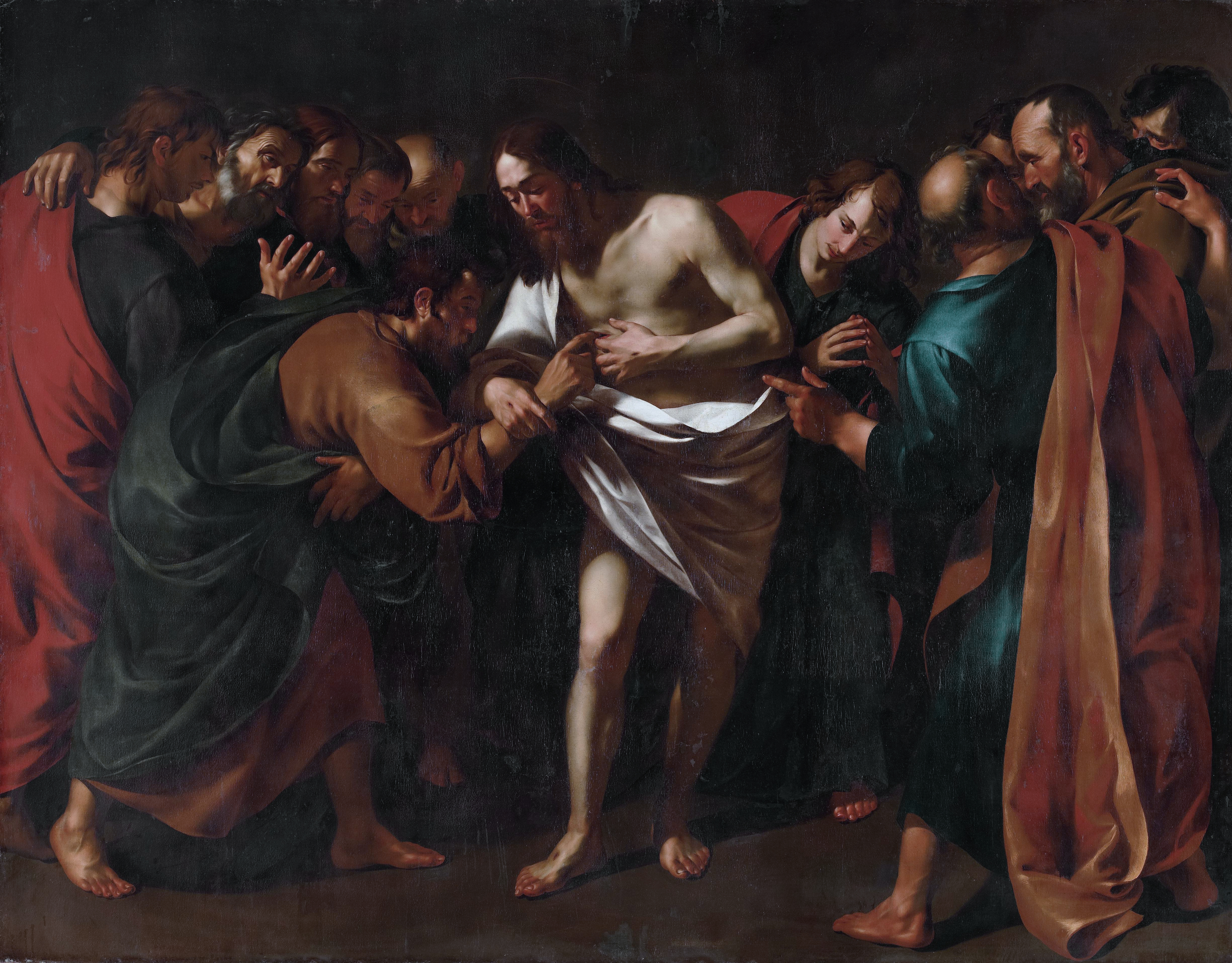
Doubting Thomas, after 1628 (Rijksmuseum, Amsterdam)

In 1631 and 1641, Crabeth received further commissions from pastor Petrus Purmerent for altarpieces for the Old Catholic Church: the Adoration of the Magi and The Conversion of William X, Duke of Aquitaine by Bernard de Clairvaux (both in the Museum Gouda). In the latter painting Crabeth used pastor Purmerent's facial features to depict saint Bernard the Clairvaux.

In addition to altarpieces, Crabeth also painted genre scenes with card players, musicians and shepherds, which are very close in style to the works of Caravaggio and his followers. These paintings were mostly painted after his return to Gouda. Only a small number of these works remain.

Wouter Crabeth's pupils include Jan Ariens Duif, Dirk de Vrije, Jan Govertsz Verbijl, Jan Verzijl and Aert Van Waes.

== Partial list of works ==
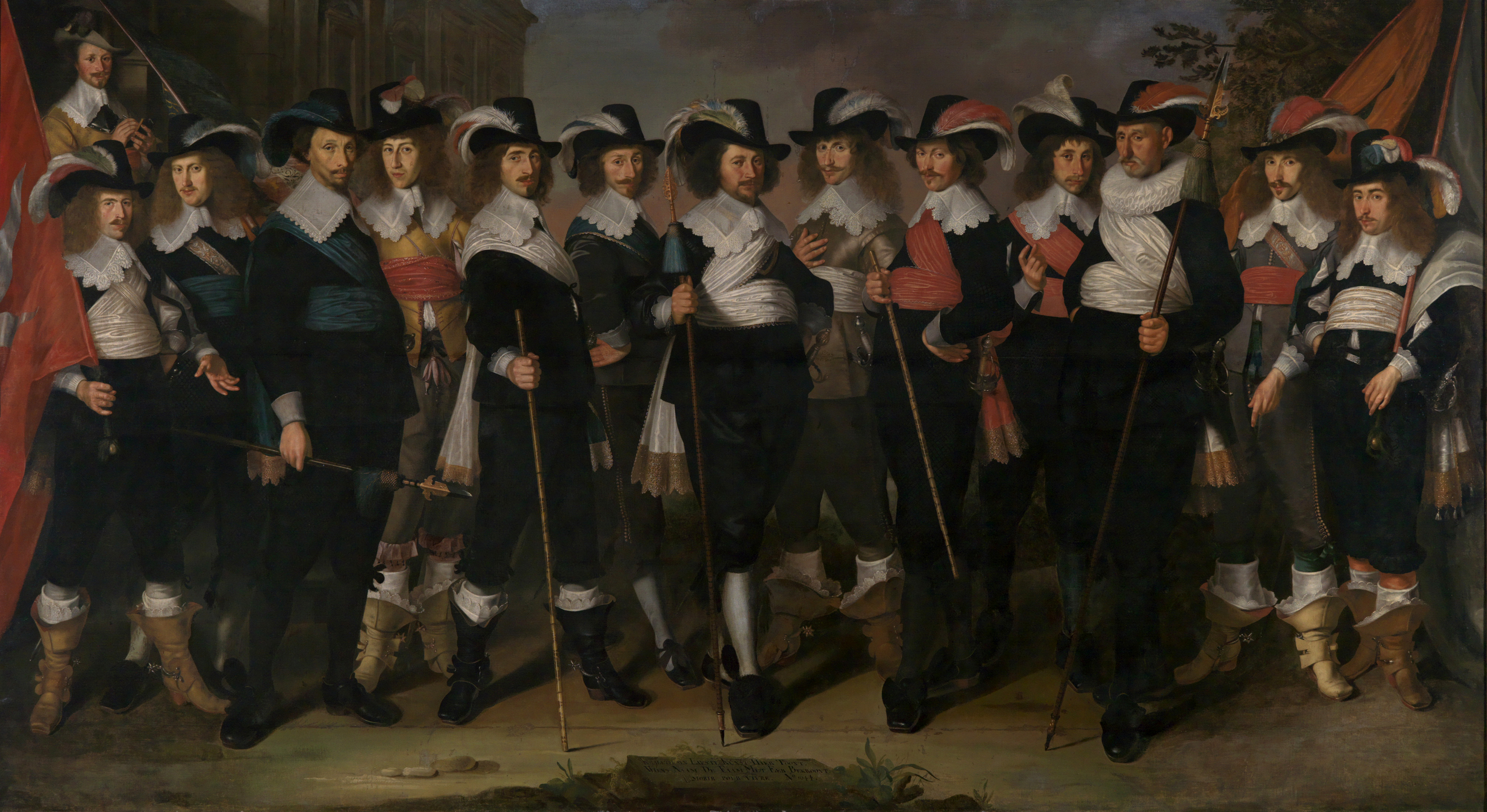
The officers of Gouda's four civil militia ensigns, led by Col. Herman Herbertsz., 1644 (Museum Gouda)

- Adoration of the Magi (Aanbidding der Koningen), 1631 (Museum Gouda).
- Amusement of the shepherds (Herdersvermaak) (Koninklijk Museum voor Schone Kunsten, Antwerp).
- The Assumption of the Virgin Mary (Ten-Hemelopneming van Maria), 1628 (Museum het Catharina Gasthuis, Gouda).
- The Drinker (attributed; present location unknown, sold on 11 March 1999 by Marc-Arthur Kohn of Paris).
- Music Making Company. c. 1635, (Museum of Fine Arts, Budapest).
- The Conversion of William X, Duke of Aquitaine by Bernard de Clairvaux (Bernardus van Clairvaux bekeert Willem van Aquitanië, 1641 (Museum Gouda).
- Couple playing the flute (Koninklijk Museum voor Schone Kunsten, Antwerp).
- The dying warrior (Stervende krijgsman) (private collection).

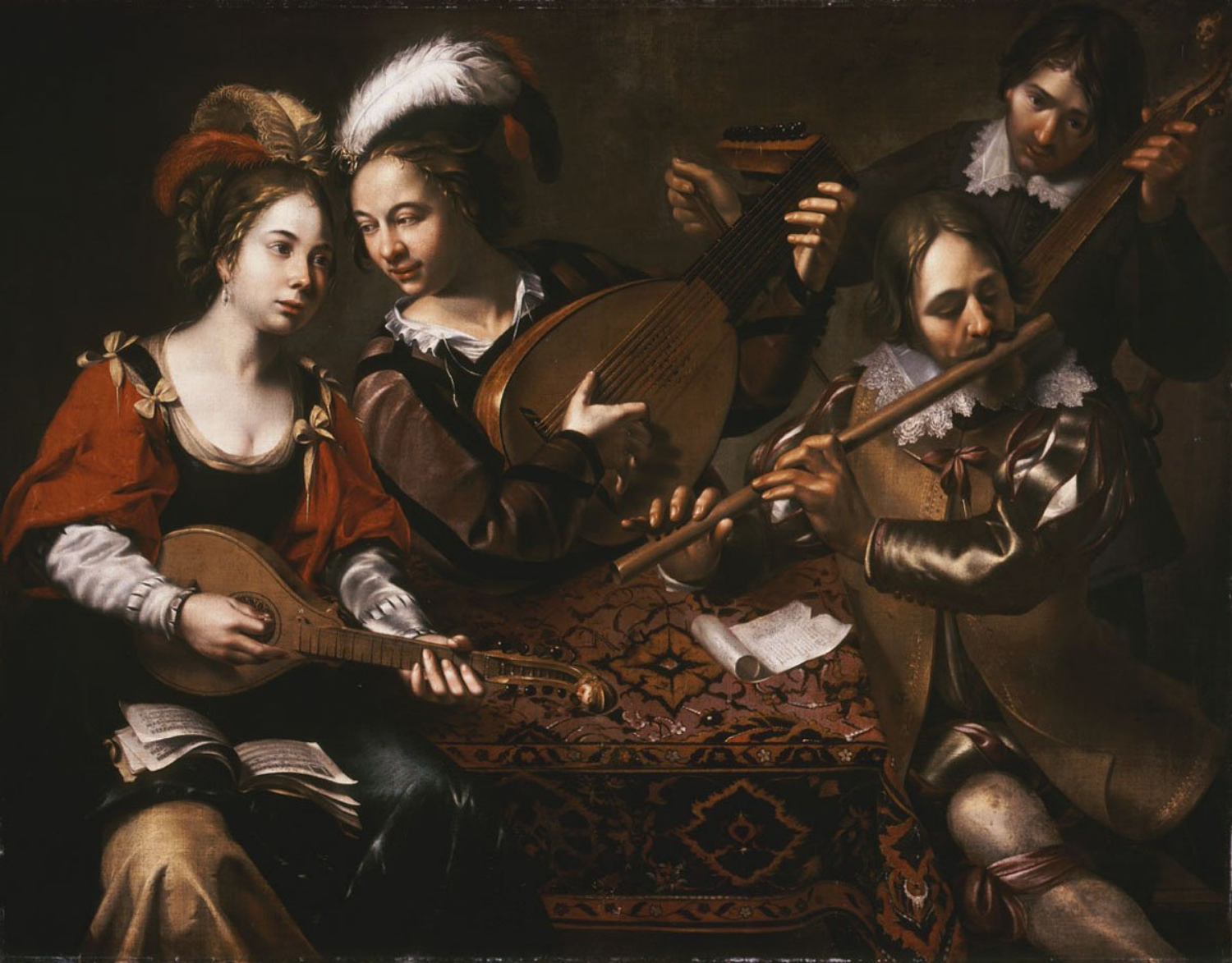
Music Making Company, c. 1635, Museum of Fine Arts, Budapest

- The card players (Muzeum Narodowe, Warsaw).
- The card players (place of conservation unknown, sold at auction 17 January 1992 by Sotheby's in New York).
- The officers of Gouda's four civil militia ensigns, led by Col. Herman Herbertsz., 1644 (Museum het Catharina Gasthuis Gouda).
- Entombment of Christ, probably destroyed in 1945 (last seen in the Kaiser-Friedrich-Museum, Berlin).
- The Wedding at Cana (De Bruiloft te Kana), painted 1640 (Museum het Catharina Gasthuis Gouda).
- Doubting Thomas (Ongelovige Thomas), around 1628 (Rijksmuseum, Amsterdam – loaned to the Museum Gouda).
- The Cardsharps (Gemäldegalerie, Berlin).

== Sources ==
- (in Dutch) J. Schouten, Wie waren zij ? Een reeks van Goudse mannen en vrouwen die men niet mag vergeten, Repro-Holland, Alphen aan den Rijn, 1980.
- (in Dutch) Xander Van Eck, Kunst, twist en devotie, Eburon, Delft, 1994 ISBN 90-5166-408-7
- (in Dutch) De Gilden in Gouda, Museum Het Catharina Gasthuis Gouda - Waanders Zwolle, Gouda, 1996,ISBN 90-400-9924-3
- (in Dutch) I. Walvis, Beschrijving der stad Gouda door I.W., 2 dln., Gouda, 1713, éd. fac-similée 1972
- (in Dutch) Rudie Van Leeuwen, « Portretten op een contrareformatorisch altaarstuk : Wouter Pietersz. Crabeths Ten Hemelopneming van Maria uit 1628 », in Desipientia : Zin & Waan, année 14, nr. 2 (nov. 2007), p. 44-45.
- (in English) Benedict Nicolson, Burlington Magazine, Caravaggism in Europe, 1989.
