= List of stained glass windows in the Janskerk, Gouda =

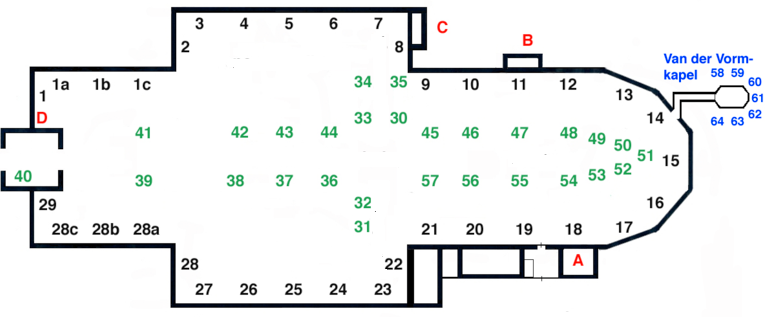
Map of the stained-glass windows by number in the Janskerk in Gouda

The stained-glass windows in the Sint Janskerk can be viewed by visitors after paying a modest entrance fee. The earliest windows date from 1555, three years after a destructive fire laid waste to the earlier church built in the same place. The creation of stained-glass windows was temporarily halted in 1572 following Gouda's decision to side with the Protestant faction in the Eighty Years' War, but the process was resumed a few years later with windows of a different and more worldly character. As a result, the church features stained-glass windows from both Roman Catholic and Protestant donors – a highly unusual combination. The most treasured is the series of windows around the Choir that portray the life of John the Baptist, the city's patron saint, in parallel with that of Jesus Christ.

== North transept ==
Number	Date	Title	Donor	Designer	Glazier	Image
1	1596	Freedom of conscience	Staten van Holland	Joachim Wtewael	Adriaan Gerritsz de Vrije	
1a	1933	Mosaic glass				
1b	1933	Mosaic glass				
1c	2016	Erasmus and the Freedom of Conscience in 2016	Museum Gouda	Marc Mulders	Marc Mulders	
2	1597	Capture of Damietta	Haarlem	Willem Thibaut		
3	1597	The maid of Dordrecht	Dordrecht	Gerrit Gerritsz Cuyp		
4	1594	The heraldic shields of the Dijkreeves under two female representations of Justice and Courage	Hoogheemraadschap van Rijnland		Adriaen Gerritsz de Vrije	
5	1561	The Queen of Sheba visits Solomon	Elburg van den Boetzelaer	Wouter Crabeth I		
6	1571	Judith and Holofernes	Jan van Ligne	Dirk Crabeth		
7	1557	The King's window with Solomon in the Tempel and the Last Supper	Philip II of Spain	Dirk Crabeth		
8	1566	The punishment of Heliodorus	Eric II, Duke of Brunswick-Lüneburg	Wouter Crabeth I		

== Choir ==
id	date	title	donor	designer	glazier	image
9	1561	Announcing the birth of John the Baptist	Dirck van Hensbeeck	Lambert van Noort	Digman Meynaert	
10	1655	Annunciation	Theodorus Spiering van Wen	Daniël Tomberg	Albert Merinck	
11	1562	Birth of John the Baptist	Herman Lethmaet	Lambert van Noort	Digman Meynaert & Hans Scrivers	
12	1564	Birth of Jesus	Canon priests of Oude Munster		Wouter Crabeth I	
13	1560	Jesus in the Temple	Petrus van Suyren	Lambert van Noort	Digman Meynaert & Hans Scrivers	
14	1557	Jesus on the Mount	Robert van Bergen	Dirk Crabeth		
15	1555	Baptism of Jesus	George van Egmond	Dirk Crabeth		
16	1556	Jesus on the Mount	Cornelis van Mierop	Dirk Crabeth		
17	1556	John's punishment of Herodus	Wolter van Byler	Jan van Zijl Henricksz		
18	1556	Jesus imprisoned	Gerrit Heije Gerritsz & Frederik Ariensz	Dirk Crabeth		
19	1570	Beheading of St. John	Hendrik van Zwolle	Willem Thybaut		
20	1933	Mosaic glass				
21	1933	Mosaic glass				

== South transept ==
id	date	title	donor	designer	glazier	image
22	1567	Jesus drives the moneychangers from the Temple	Willem the Silent	Dirk Crabeth		
23	1562	Elijah, with foot washing and with portrait of the donor, the Duchess of Parma	Margaret of Parma	Wouter Crabeth I		
24	1559	Philippus and the King of Ethiopia	Philippe de Ligne	Dirk Crabeth		
25	1603	Siege of Leiden ends	Delft	Isaac van Swanenburg	Dirck Verheyden & Dirk van Douwe	
26	1601	Siege of Samaria ends	Leiden	Isaac van Swanenburg	Cornelis Clock	
27	1597	Pharisee and the Publican	Amsterdam	Hendrick de Keyser	Cornelis IJsbrantsz Cussens	
28	1601	Jesus and the adultress	Rotterdam	Claes Wytmans		
28a	1947	Commemorative window for 1940–1945	Gouda residents	Charles Eyck		
28b	1935	Window with heraldic shields of donors	Rotterdam	D. Boode	L.J. Knoll	
28c	1920	Rebuilding the Temple	Rotterdam	H. Veldhuis	L.J. Knoll	
29	1596	The Christian knight and David	Cities of North Holland		Adriaen Gerritsz de Vrije	

== Literature ==
- Henny VAN HARTEN-BOERS & Zsuzsanna VAN RUYVEN-ZEMAN, The Stained-Glass Windows in the Sint-Janskerk at Gouda. The glazing of the Clerestory of the Choir and of the former Monastic Church of the Regulars, Amsterdam, 1997.
- Zsuzsanna VAN RUYVEN-ZEMAN, The Stained-Glass Windows in the Sint-Janskerk at Gouda, 1556–1604, Amsterdam, 2000
- Xander VAN ECK & Christiane E. COEBERGH, The Stained-Glass Windows in the Sint-Janskerk at Gouda. Dirk and Wouter Crabeth, Amsterdam, 2002
- Zsuzsanna VAN RUYVEN-ZEMAN, Xander VAN ECK & Henny VAN DOLDER – DE WIT, Het geheim van Gouda: de cartons van de Goudse glazen, Zutphen (Walburg Pers) 2002, ISBN 9057301679
