= Willem Tomberg =

Dutch painter

Willem Tomberg (1670–1712) was an 18th-century writer and stained glass painter.

== Biography ==
He was born in Gouda. According to Houbraken he was the son of Daniel who informed him that the Gouda glass painting art was founded by monks in the local monasteries. Willem wrote the handwritten "Goudsche Arcadia" that served as inspiration for Ignatius Walvis' Description of Gouda Tomberg felt that the brothers Wouter and Dirk Crabeth were the greatest masters of the art of glass painting that died with them. He described the art of stained-glass making, explaining that the colors were not painted on, but first, metals such as "silver, iron, copper, bloedstone, iron- or lead oxide" were painted on the glass which was then baked in an oven, and afterwards the outlines (diepzels) were applied and the glass was heated a second time. He said that his father Daniel first learned the art as an apprentice of seven years from Westerhoud van Uitrecht and later from the father of Anthony van Dyck. It was this training and expertise that led Daniel to be selected as the restorer of the windows that were damaged during the storm of 1674, though he claimed the colors were never quite the same and they never did discover how the black of the cape of the abbess of Rijnsburg had been made.

According to the RKD Tomberg made the stained glass windows of the Gouda Lutheran church.

He died in Gouda in 1712.
