= Dirk de Vrije =

Dutch Golden Age glass painter

Dirk de Vrije (1620, Gouda – 1681, Gouda), was a Dutch Golden Age glass painter.

== Biography ==
According to the RKD he was probably related to the glass painter Adriaan Gerritsz de Vrije, who was active in the Janskerk (Gouda). According to van der Aa he was a pupil of Wouter Crabeth II, and another master in Utrecht. He travelled several times to France, until he became a member of the Gouda vroedschap or city council. He was mentioned as one of the 16th-century artists of the stained glass window cartoons in an exhibition of the Janskerk in Gouda in 1938, but his name was probably confused with Dirk Jansz Verheije (d. 1603) of Delft, a painter from Delft who made the window-gift from Delft for the Janskerk in the 16th century. If he was active for the Janskerk, he may perhaps have been the assistant of Adriaan de Vrije, since he was mentioned along with him in Ignatius Walvis' Description of Gouda in 1714. He is listed as mayor (burgermeester) of Gouda and city mason (fabrykmeester) in 1674–1681.

According to Houbraken (who was quoting Walvis), he was a respected painter of Gouda and contemporary of Adriaen van der Spelt. He died while mayor of Gouda.
