= Nicolaas Ruysch =

Dutch Roman Catholic priest

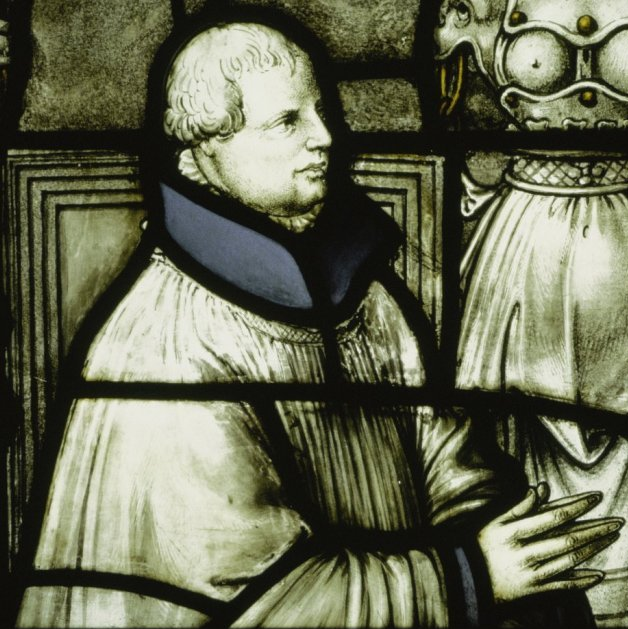
- Ruysch depicted on one of the Gouda glasses

Personal life
- Born: c. 1496
- Died: 12 October 1558
- Education: University of Leuven

Religious life
- Religion: Roman Catholic

Nicolaas Ruysch (c. 1496 – 12 October 1558) was a canon, vice-dean and treasurer of St. Salvator's Church in Utrecht and councilor of the Bishop of Liège, Robert of Berghes.

== Biography ==
Nicolaas Ruysch was a son of Ruysch Jansz, alderman and mayor of Amsterdam and Divera. He studied in Leuven and Orléans and is said to have obtained a doctorate in law in Italy. From 1508 to 1558, he was canon of St. Salvator's in Utrecht, where he would also become vice dean and treasurer. He was also a counselor to the Bishop of Liège Robert van Mons. Ruysch maintained a relationship with Maria Claes Weymansdr, daughter of the glassmaker Claes Weyman. Three children were born from this relationship.

Ruysch, together with Bishop of Utrecht George van Egmond and his then vicar Nicolaas van Nieuwland, was involved in the arrangement that the regulars of Stein - after the fire in 1549 that destroyed their monastery - could move into the monastery in 1551. Brigitte Monastery on the Raam in Gouda. A few years later, in 1556, he would also be the donor of a glass for the newly built chapel of the monastery. The stained glass from this monastery was transferred to St. John's Church in Gouda in 1580. Since 1934, this has been one of the glasses in the Van der Vorm Chapel of this church. It concerns the representation of Jesus shown to the people by Pilate, ecce homo. The glass was designed by Dirk Crabeth and made by one or more of his employees. Ruysch is depicted as the donor of this glass at the bottom.

Ruysch was also involved, together with Herman Lethmaet, in raising funds for the manufacture of the new stained glass in the St. John's Church in Gouda.

== Sources ==
- Bosch, R. A., De 72 glazen van de Sint Janskerk in Gouda, Delft, 2008.
- Bogaers, Llewellyn "De religieuze gedrevenheid van Dirck Weyman" in Jaarboek Oud Utrecht, 1993.
- Dolder-de Wit, Henny van, "Goudse kloosters in de middeleeuwen (10): De Birgitten en het dubbelklooster Mariënsterre", in Tidinge van Die Goude, jaargang 17 nr. 3, juli 1999.
