= Cornelis IJsbrantsz Cussens =

Dutch painter

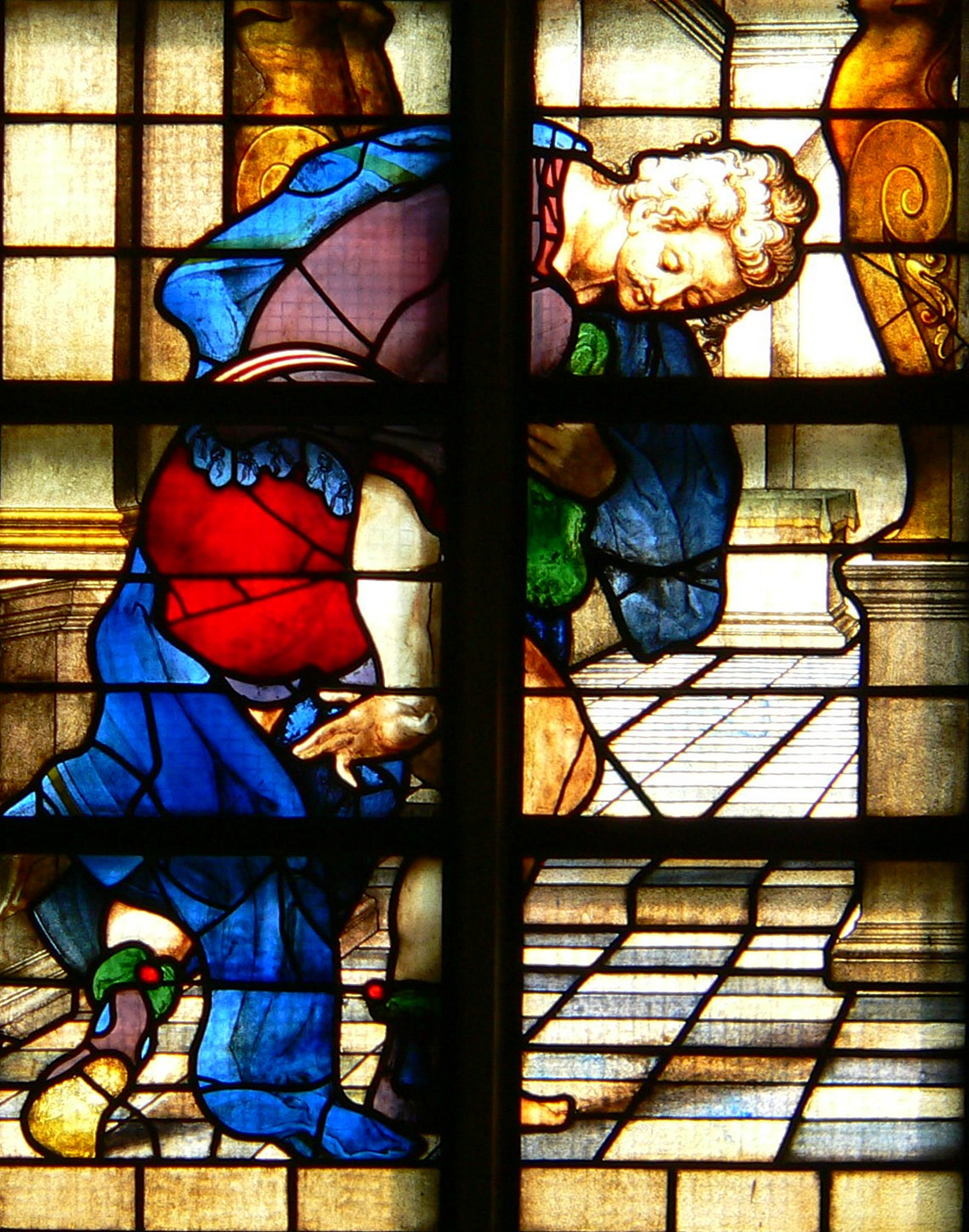
Cussens' "Pharisee and the Publican", glass 27 in the Sint Janskerk

Cornelis Cussens (1580 – 24 May 1618) was a Dutch Golden Age draughtsman and glass painter.

== Biography ==
Cussens was born and died in Haarlem. According to Houbraken he was a contemporary of the brothers Crabeth and Willem Thibaut.

According to Karel van Mander who called him Cornelis Ysbrandsz, he was an excellent glass painter who owned some works by Hendrick Goltzius.

According to the RKD he was a draughtsman known for his figures.
