= Daniël Tomberg =

Dutch Golden Age glass painter (1603–1678)

- Born: 1603; Gouda, Dutch Republic
- Died: 1678 (aged 74–75); Gouda, Dutch Republic
- Education: Pupil of Alexander Westerhout
- Occupation: Glass painter
- Known for: Stained glass design and restoration
- Notable work: Glass 10, Janskerk, Gouda (1655); Restoration of Glass 22, Janskerk, Gouda (1655)
- Movement: Dutch Golden Age
- Children: Willem Tomberg
- Parent: Hermboldus Tombergen (father)

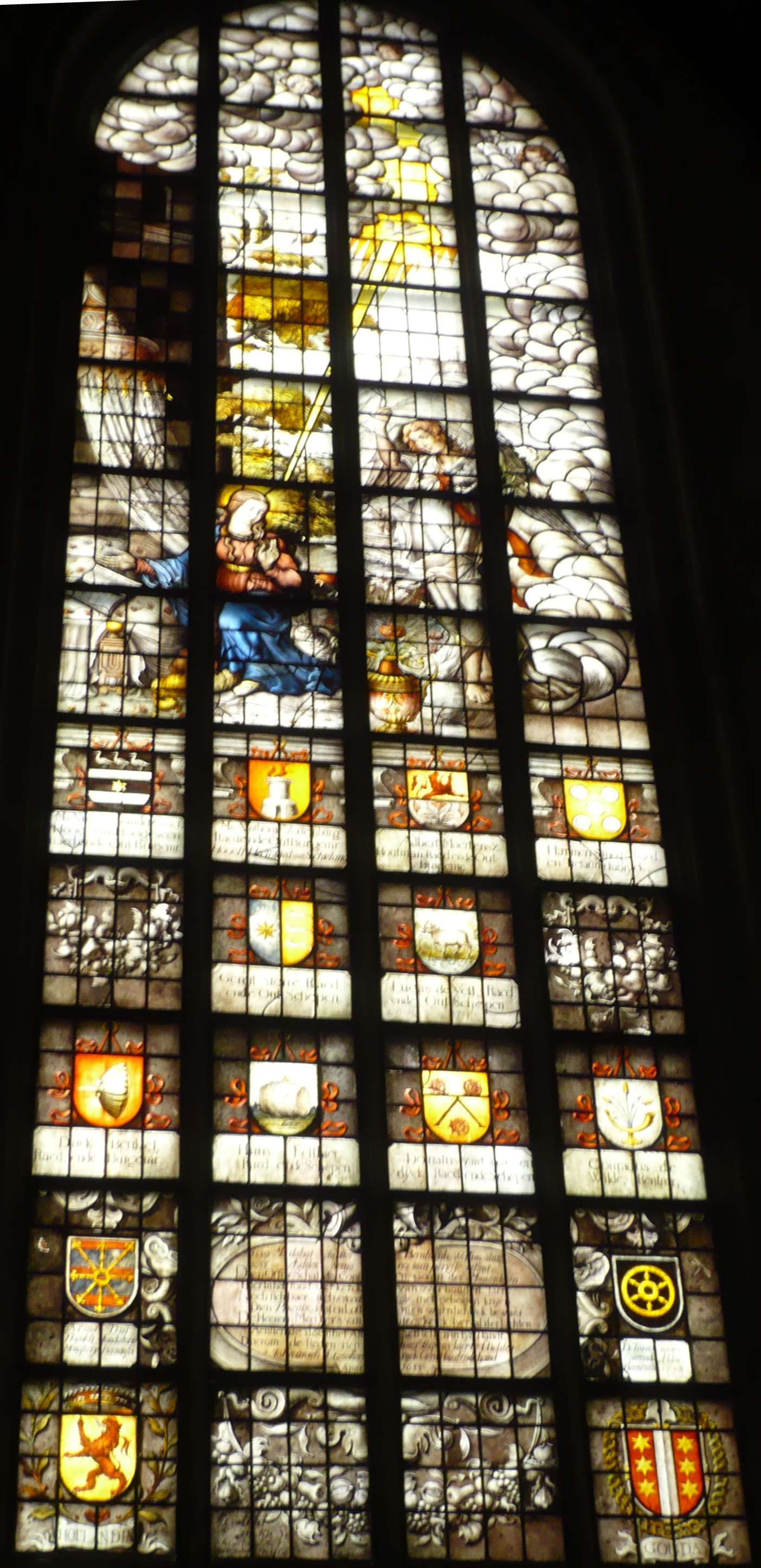
Glass 10 in the Janskerk, Gouda, 1655

Daniël Tomberg (1603, Gouda – 1678, Gouda), was a Dutch Golden Age glass painter.

== Early life ==
Tomberg was born in 1603 in Gouda.

According to Houbraken, he was the son of the Remonstrant minister Hermboldus Tombergen and the father of the glass painter and author Willem Tomberg, who wrote a description of the stained glass windows in the Janskerk of Gouda. It is unclear if Houbraken was informed first-hand by Willem Tomberg or took his information from Ignatius Walvis's Description of Gouda, but he used him as a source for his biographies of the Gouda glass painters. Daniel Tomberg had been a pupil of Alexander Westerhout, the glass painter who studied under the father of Anthony van Dijk.

== Career ==
He reused Dirk Crabeth's designs in Gouda for his restoration of the windows numbered 10 and 22 in the Janskerk after these windows were badly damaged after a heavy storm in 1654. Tomberg was appointed curator in the same year and repaired the window, including a set of heraldic shields at the bottom of the glass indicating the mayors of Gouda in 1655. After his death, his cartoon of Glass 10 was traded for a grave in the church, and he was succeeded as curator of the windows by his son Willem.

== Death ==
According to the RKD he died in 1678 in Gouda.
