= Westerhout =

Westerhout is a Dutch surname.

Westerhout may also refer to:

== People with the surname ==
- Alexander Westerhout (1590–1661), a Dutch glass painter
- Gart Westerhout (1927–2012), a Dutch astronomer
- Madeleine Westerhout (born 1990), an American political secretary

== Other ==
- A 20th-century astronomical catalog, including W40, W43, and W49
- The asteroid 5105 Westerhout (also known as 1986 TM_{1})
