= Cornelis van Mierop =

Dutch Catholic priest (1509–1572)

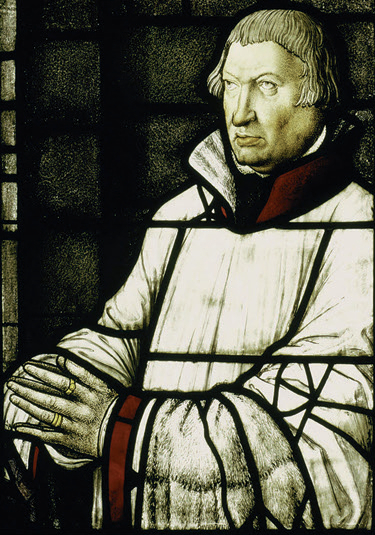
- Van Mierop (kneeling) depicted on one of the Gouda glasses

Provost of Utrecht
- In office 1545–1572
- Preceded by: Jan Slacheck
- Succeeded by: Anton de Hénin de Boussu

Councilor in the Privy Council

Personal life
- Born: 1509
- Died: 1572 (aged 62–63)
- Education: University of Leuven

Religious life
- Religion: Roman Catholic

Cornelis Vincentsz van Mierop (1509–1572) was a Dutch archdeacon and cathedral provost, serving as head of the cathedral chapter of St. Martin's Cathedral, Utrecht, the Netherlands. He was also dean of the chapter of St. Salvator's Church in Utrecht.

== Life and work ==
Van Mierop was a son of the Treasurer General of Holland, Vincent Cornelisz and Maria Ruysch. He registered as a minor at the University of Leuven in 1522, which shows that he was not yet fourteen years old at the time (the age at which a boy was allowed to register as an adult there). In 1528, he became dean of the canons of the Hague Court Chapel. He followed in the footsteps of his grandfather, Jacob Ruysch. In 1533, he studied law in Padua, where he received his doctorate in law. Once again, he followed in his grandfather's footsteps. From 1534 to 1537, he was also an unpaid councilor in the Court of Holland. In 1541, he donated the "Maaghdeglas" to the Grote Kerk of The Hague. In 1545, Van Mierop was appointed cathedral provost in Utrecht. From 1 June 1547, he was also a councilor in the Privy Council, an advisory body to the ruler at his appointment; this was Emperor Charles V. In 1556, he donated one of the stained glass windows in the Grote or Sint-Janskerk in Gouda, an image of Jesus preaching at the Jordan. He was depicted as the donor of this glass by the glazier Dirk Crabeth. Behind him stands his patron, Saint Vincent. In 1557, Van Mierop provided an interest-free loan of 500 Carolus guilders to the Brothers of the Common Life of the Hieronymushuis on the Kromme Nieuwe Gracht. A gallery was built from his house to the brothers' church and their 'librije,' where the cathedral provost had a prayer room for the rest of his life. In the Centraal Museum in Utrecht, there is a medal from 1558 on which he is depicted. In 1562, he bought the knightly town of Huis te Vliet in Lopik.

Van Mierop died in 1572. He had arranged in his will that the construction of eleven poor houses would be financed from his estate. These Myropsca lakes were built on the Springweg in Utrecht.
