= Alexander Westerhout =

Dutch painter

Alexander Hendriksz Westerhout (1590 in Gouda – 1661 in Gouda), was a Dutch Golden Age glass painter.

According to Houbraken, he was the teacher of Daniël Tomberg and came from Utrecht. He was born in Utrecht 1588 and learned to paint there from Jan van den Burg. When the glass painter Adriaan Gerritsz de Vrije died in 1643 he took over his position as curator of the stained glass windows of the Janskerk, Gouda.

According to the RKD he was born in 1590 and was a glazier and curator of the stained glass windows of the Janskerk in Gouda.
