= Maria Blom (carillonneur) =

Dutch carillonneur

Maria Blom (1914–1994) was a 20th-century Dutch carillonneur and the first woman to work as a professional carillonneur in the Netherlands.

== Life and career ==
Blom served as the carillonneur of the Sint Janskerk in Gouda from 1943-1985, and also played in IJsselstein and Kamerik. In a 1960 interview for a women’s magazine, Blom recounted how her private teacher Ferdinand Timmermans temporarily ceased teaching her, given that she had little hope of being accepted to the Royal Carillon School "Jef Denyn" as a woman. Unruffled, she hosted a summer concert series one year of exclusively women performers. She also established Gouda's famed Candle Night tradition with mobile carillon.
