= Elburg van den Boetzelaer =

Abbess of the Rijnsburg Abbey

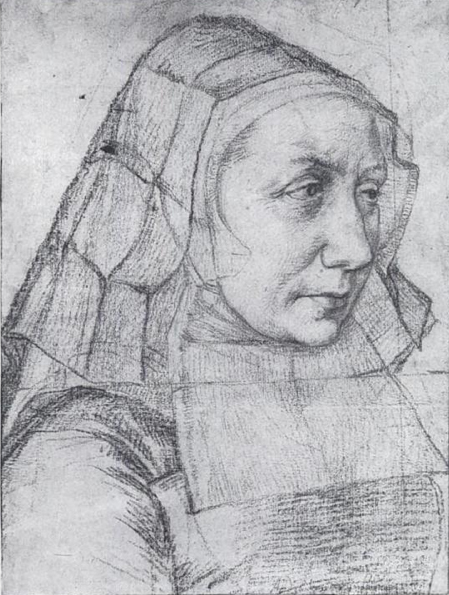
Portrait of Elburg van den Boetzelaer (1510-1568)

Elburg van Boetzelaer (1506–1568) was the Abbess of the Rijnsburg Abbey from 1553 until 1568. She played an important part within the local Counter-Reformation by her reform work of Rijnsburg Abbey and her charity work, and also played a role as a patron of contemporary Dutch Renaissance art.
