= Willem Thibaut =

Dutch painter and stained glass designer (1524-1597)

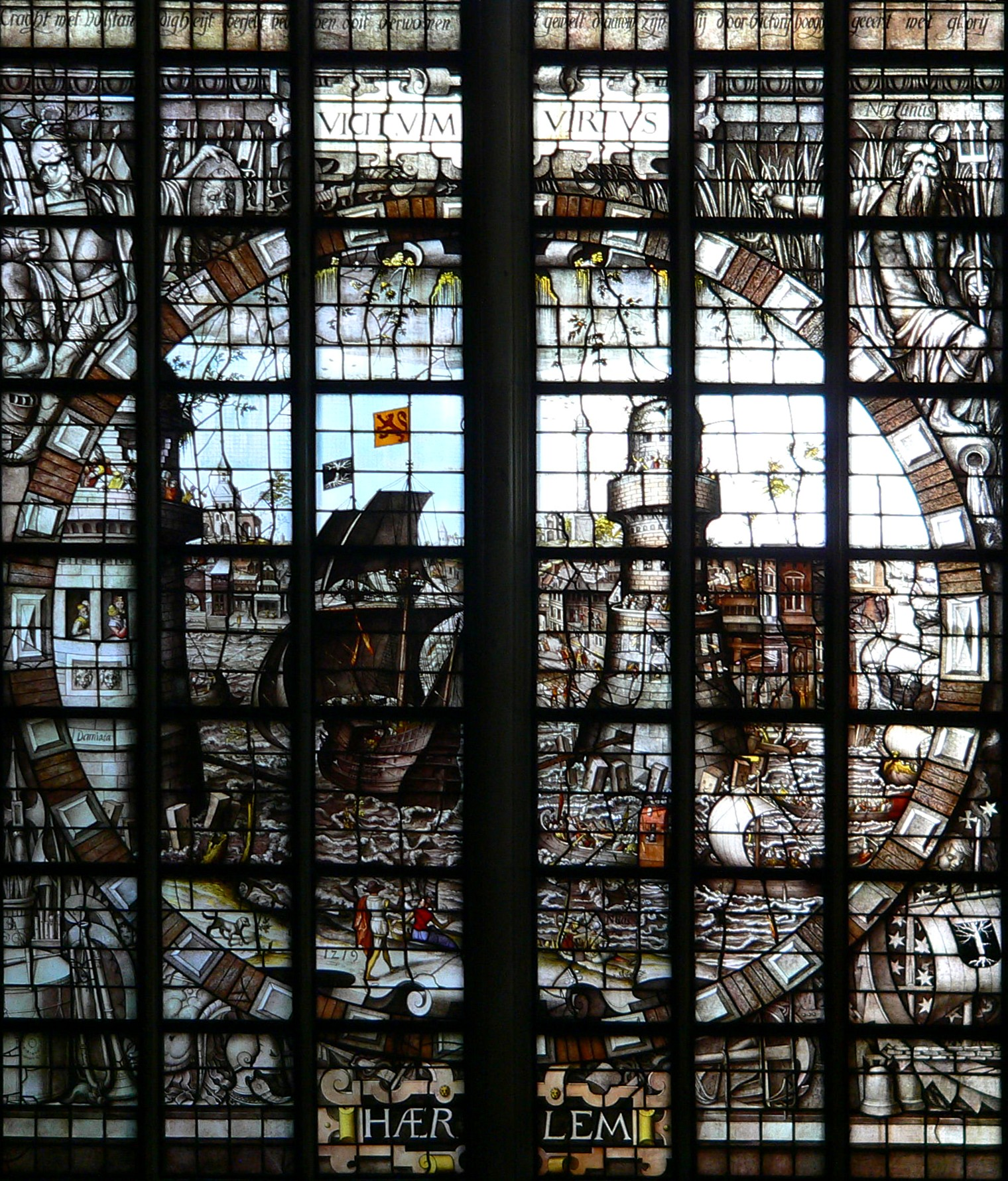
- Ship from Haarlem breaks the harbor chain of Damietta, scene from the 5th crusade (origin of the damiaatjes legend) sponsored by the city of Haarlem in Sint Janskerk, 1595-1596.
- Born: Willem Thibaut; 1524; Haarlem
- Died: 1597 (aged 72–73); Haarlem
- Known for: Painting
- Movement: Mannerist

Willem Thibaut, Tybaut, or Tibout (1524–1597), was a Dutch Golden Age painter.

== Biography ==
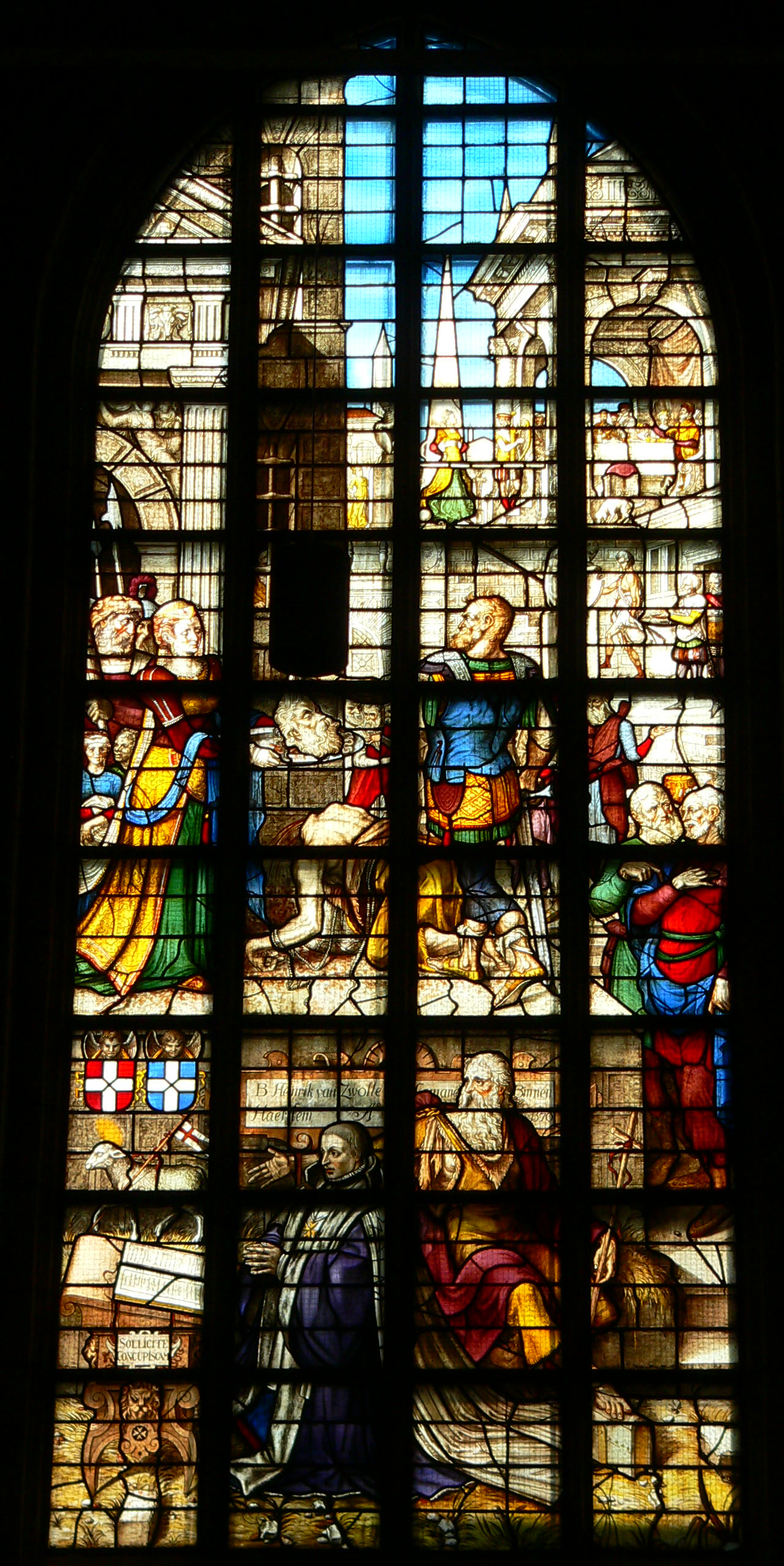
The beheading of St. John the Baptist, painted in 1595–1596.

According to the RKD, Thibaut lived and worked in Haarlem, but made the cartoons for the two stained-glass windows in Sint Janskerk in 1570.

According to Arnold Houbraken, who never understood why Karel van Mander never included glass painters in his Schilderboeck, Thibaut was famous enough to be mentioned in Samuel Ampzing's praise of Haarlem with the words How masterly he could write on glass!.

Thibaut was also the inventor of the Counts of Holland print series that was later reprinted by Philip Galle and Michiel Vosmeer (1578–1616) in 1578 in Antwerp. This series of prints was published to accompany a reprint of Melis Stoke's Hollandse Jaar-Boeken of Rijm-Kronijk in 1699 by Cornelis van Alkemade. The addendum to the title; Met de Afbeeldingen van alle de HOLLANDSE GRAVEN, Geschetst naar de aaloude schilderijen der Karmeliten te Haarlem meant that the prints were used based on the frescoes found after the Siege of Haarlem in the Carmelite monastery in Haarlem. These frescoes were copied by Thibaut and used to make a stained glass series in Leiden that are now in the possession of the Stedelijk Museum De Lakenhal. The frescoes were uncovered after the paintings hanging over them with the same subjects were removed to Haarlem city hall.

According to Dirck Volckertszoon Coornhert's biographer, Thibaut was friends with Maarten van Heemskerck, and designed prints for Coornhert. These engravings were produced in 1556-1557 and published by Hieronymus Cock, and all had to do with the foolishness of man.

== Gallery ==
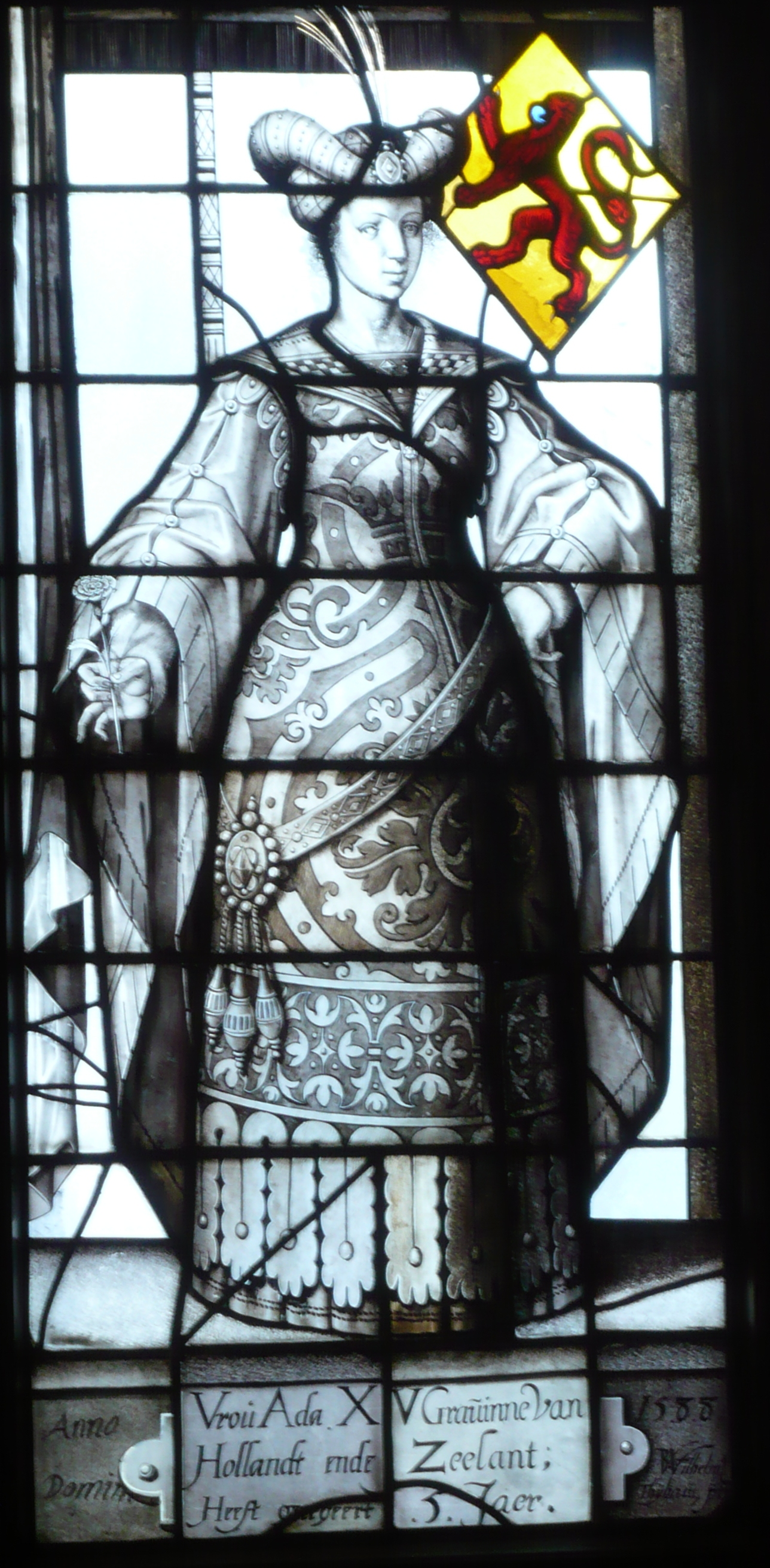
Ada, countess of Holland, Lakenhal.

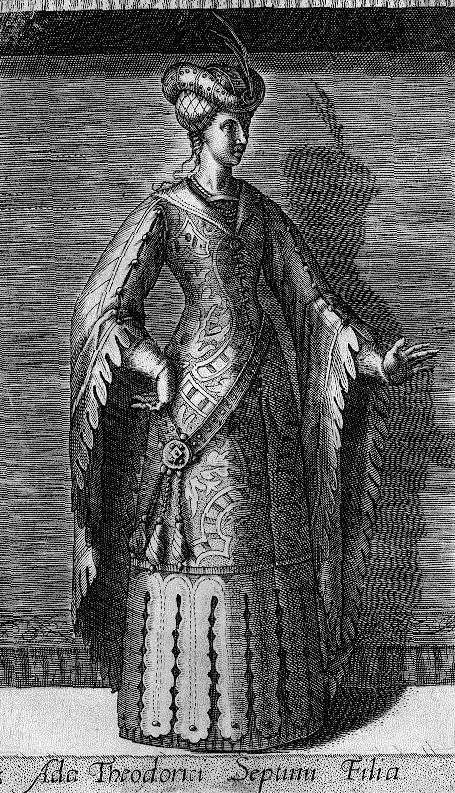
Ada in Michiel Vosmeer's book

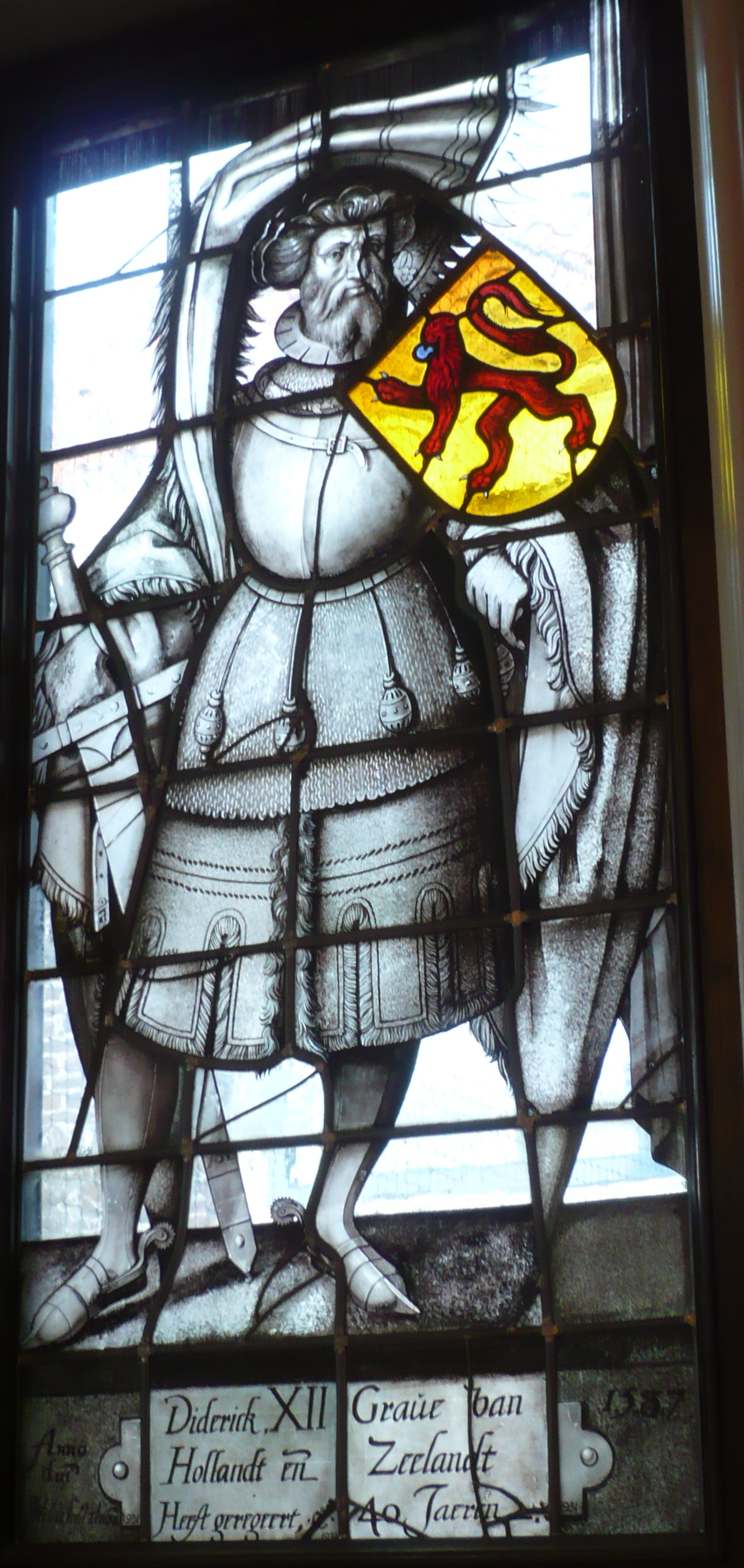
Dirk, count of Holland, Lakenhal

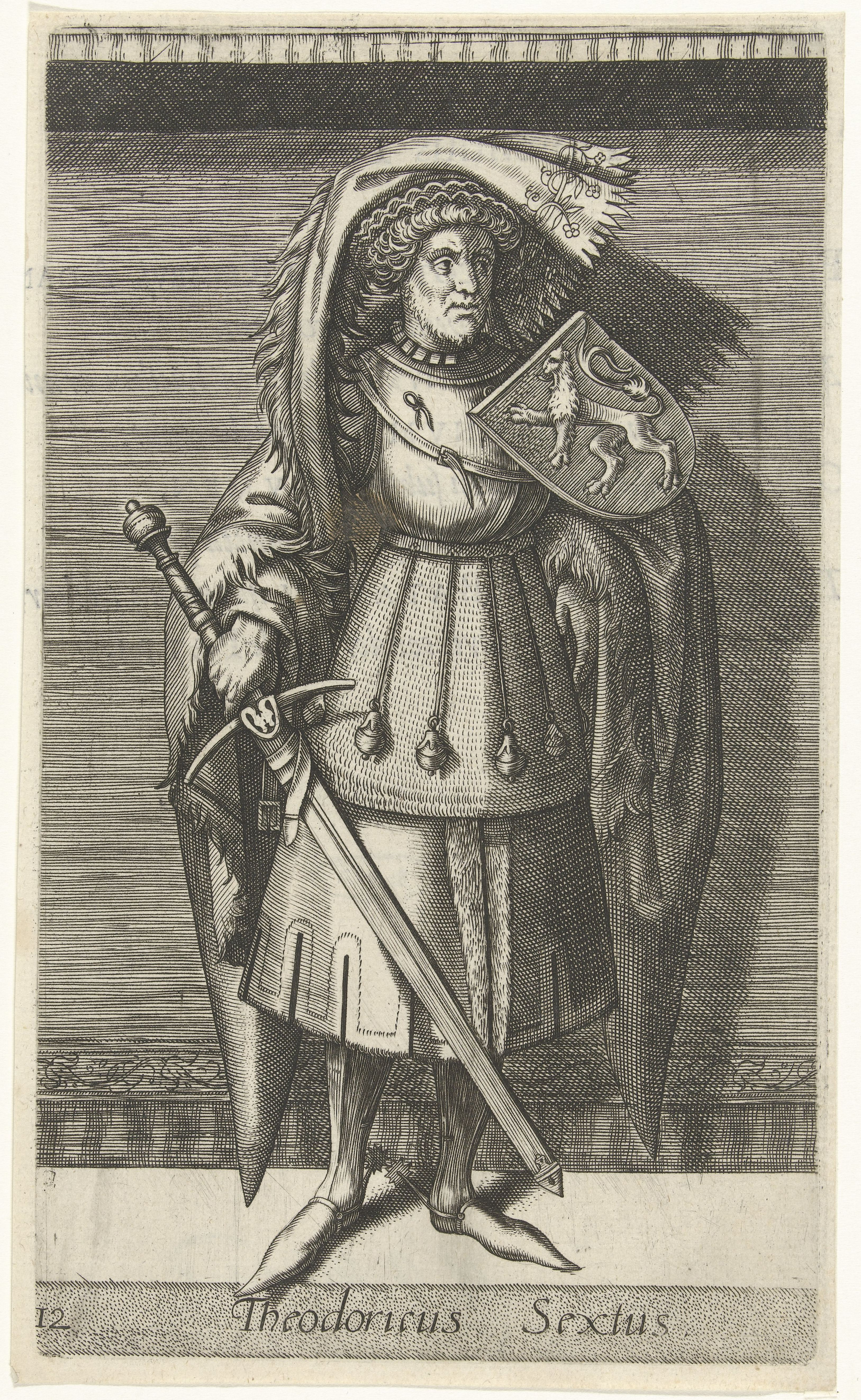
Dirk in Michiel Vosmeer's book.
