= Adriaan Gerritsz de Vrije =

Dutch painter

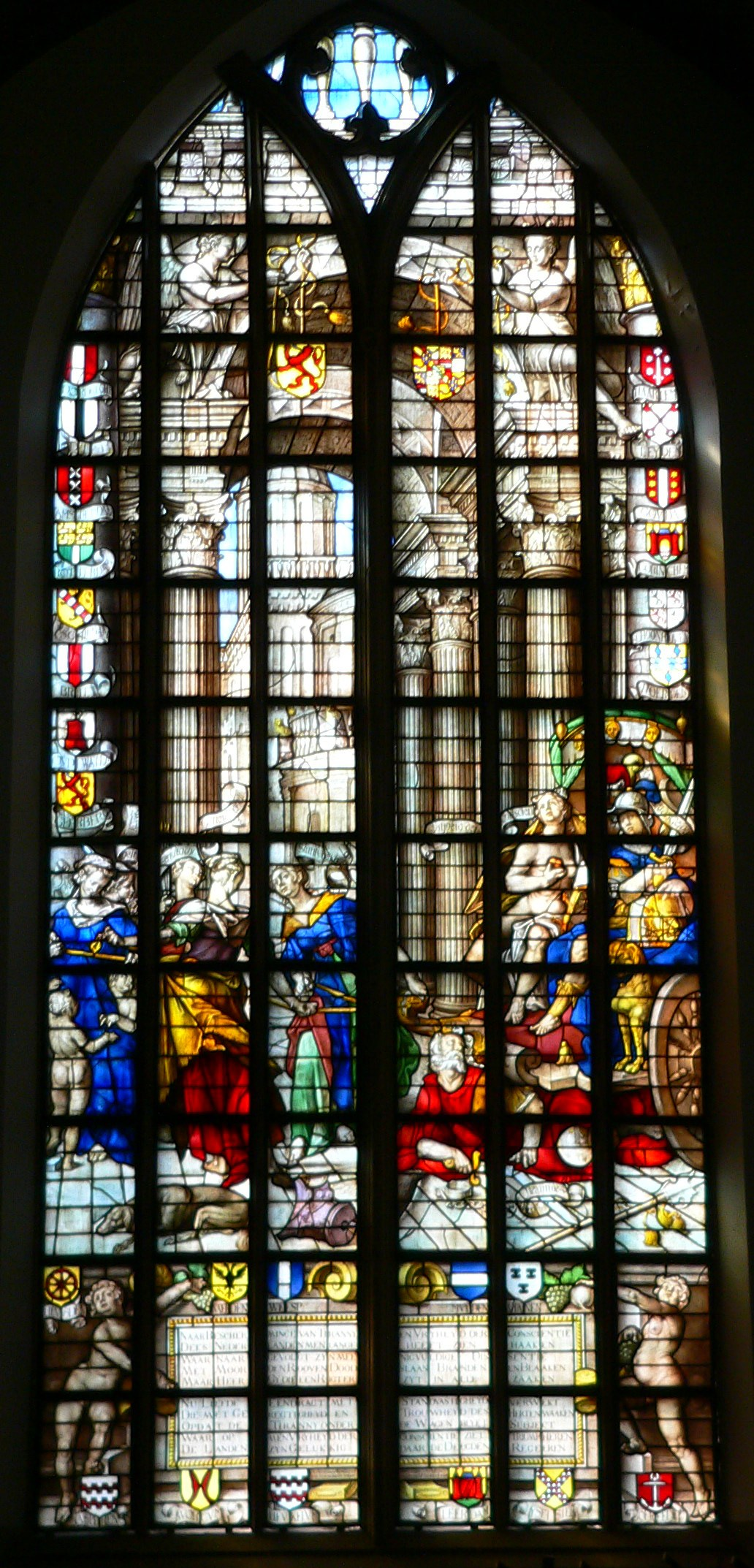
Glass 1 in the Janskerk, Gouda, designed by Joachim Wtewael and made by Adriaan Gerritsz de Vrije, 1596

Adriaan Gerritsz de Vrije (c.1570 in Gouda – 1643 in Gouda), was a Dutch Golden Age glass painter.

== Biography ==
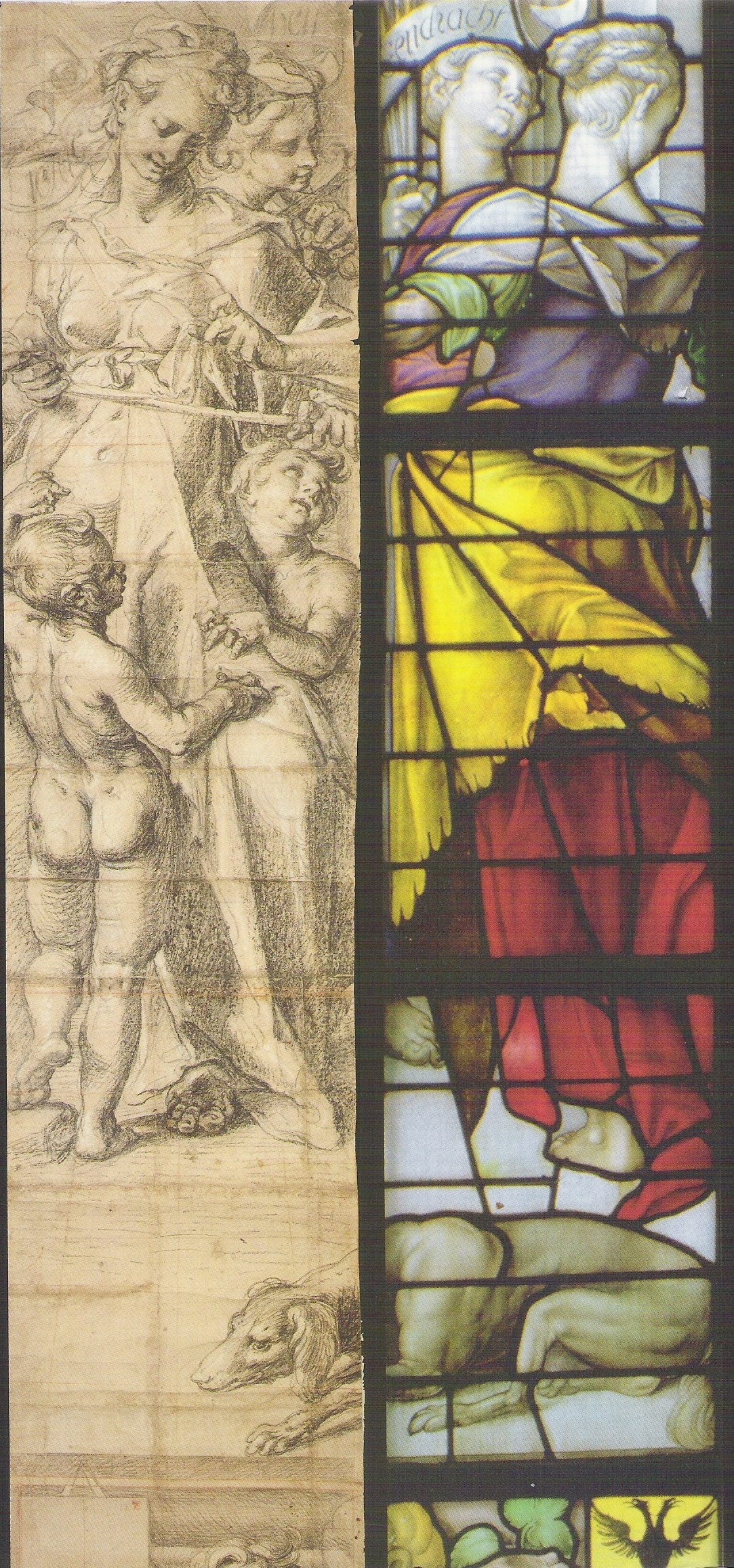
Left: drawing by Wtewael and Right: glass by De Vrije

According to the RKD he was probably related to the glass painter Dirk de Vrije. He was a pupil of Wouter and Dirk Crabeth. In 1595 he took out a loan to buy "glass manufacturing materials" and became the first curator of the stained glass windows of the Janskerk, Gouda. In service of the States of Holland, he made the window "Glass 1" after a design by Joachim Wtewael and the window "Glass 29" after his own design. In Glass 1 he also designed all of the city heraldic shields that border the main subject.
