= Ignatius Walvis =

Dutch priest and writer (1653–1714)

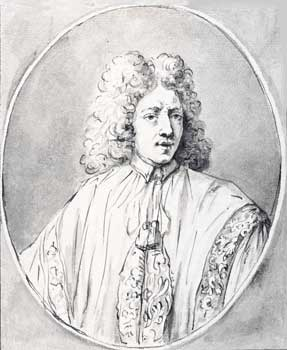
portrait of Ignatius Walvis

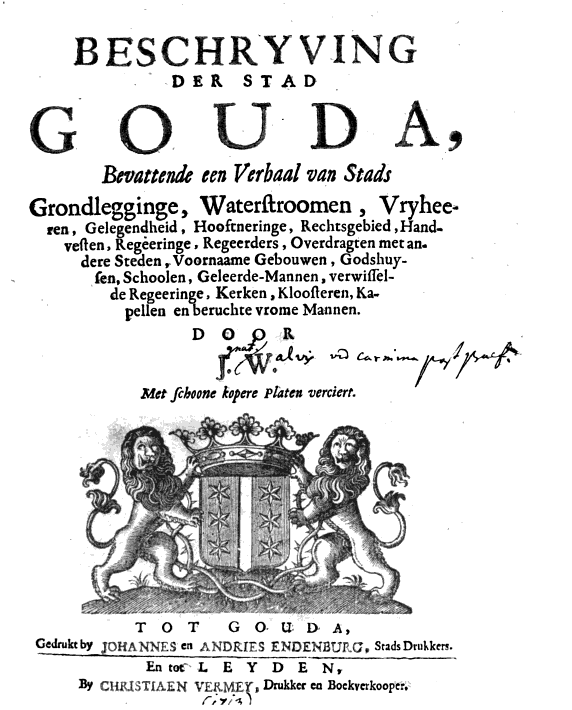
title page of Description of Gouda

Ignatius Walvis (1653, Utrecht – 1714, Gouda), was an 18th-century priest, historian, and writer from the Dutch Republic.

== Biography ==
He was the son of the painter Johan Baptist Walvis who moved from Antwerp to Utrecht in the year of his birth, and Bernardina van Aller. He studied philosophy and theology in Leuven before moving to the Hague, where he became chaplain of bij pastoor Jan Hooft. In 1688 he replaced Jacob Catz (1639-1712) as pastor of Gouda, who had been called to Utrecht to assist Petrus Codde. In Gouda Walvis wrote his Description of Gouda, which was published the year of his death. He was accused of Jansenism. In 1713 he was appointed as a member of the vicariate council (Metropolitan Chapter) of Utrecht.

According to Houbraken he mentioned that the father of Anthony van Dyck was a stained glass painter of Den Bosch.
