= Sint Janskerk =

Large Gothic church in Gouda, Netherlands

Coordinates: 52°0′39″N 4°42′41″E

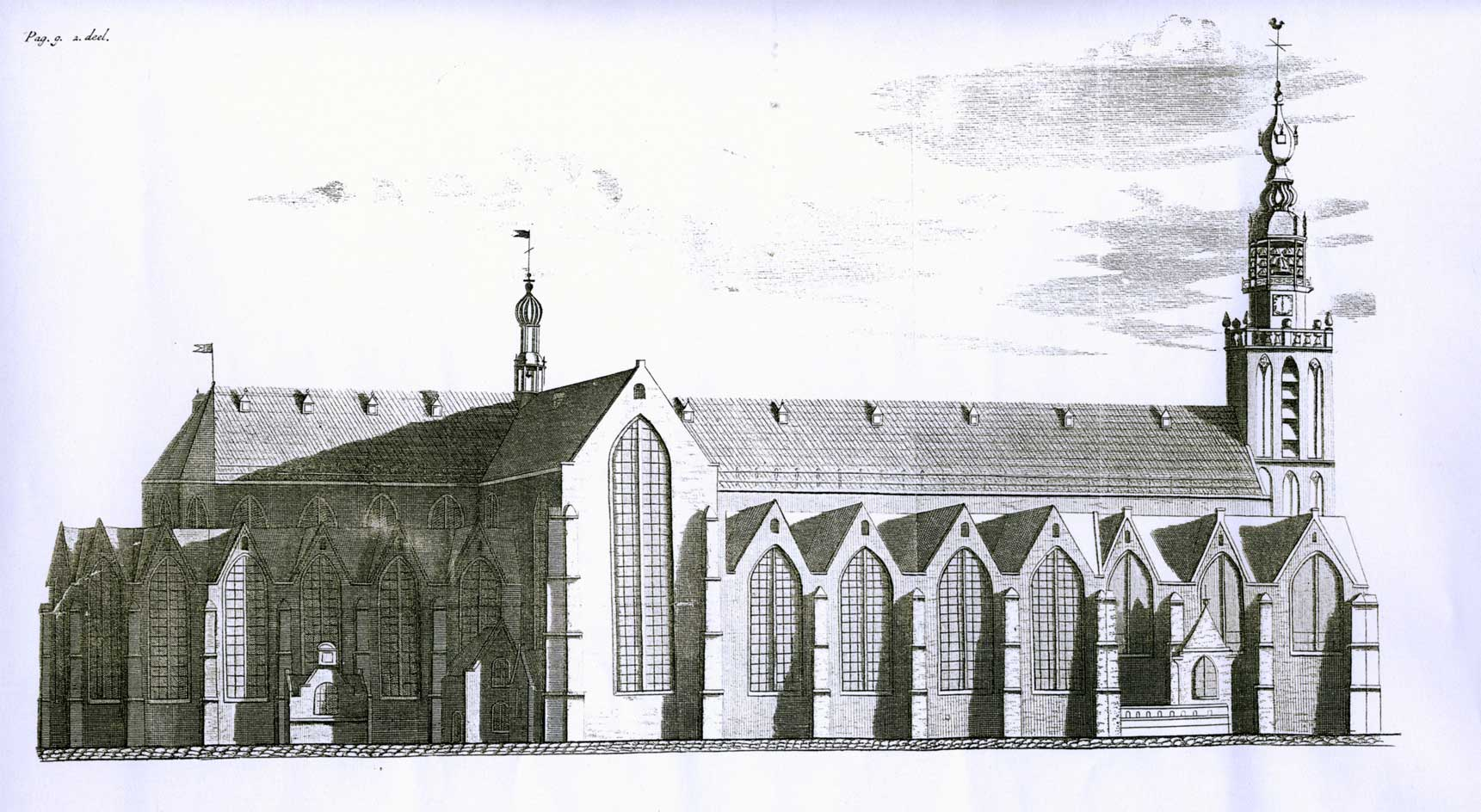
The St. Jans or Groote kerk in the city Gouda - (1714) From: Description of the city Gouda, by Ignatius Walvis

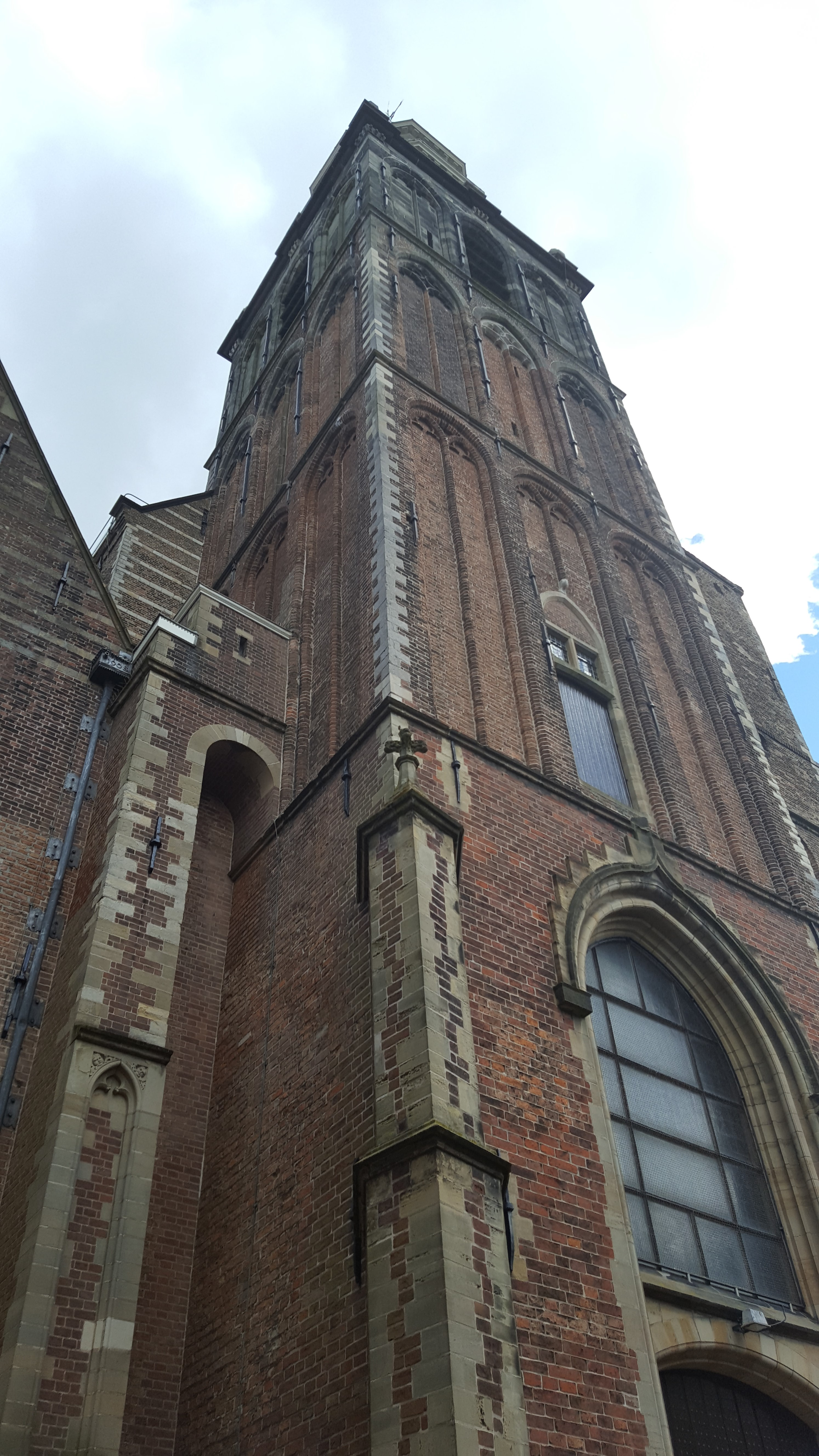
Churchtower of the Sint-Janskerk in Gouda

The Sint Janskerk in Gouda, the Netherlands, is a large Gothic church, known especially for its stained glass windows, for which it has been placed on the list of the top 100 Dutch monuments.

== History ==
The church is dedicated to John the Baptist, the patron saint of Gouda, and was built during the 15th and 16th centuries. In 1552 a large part of the church burned, including the archives. Most information of the early period is taken from the diaries of Ignatius Walvis. Around 1350 a tower was built (only the lower part remains). In 1485 the foundation was built for the present-day choir. This expansion made the church the longest in the Netherlands, with a length of 123 meters.

The stained glass windows were made and installed primarily by the brothers Dirk and Wouter Crabeth I, in the years 1555-1571. After a short stop for the Protestant Reformation, more windows were installed until 1603, but by other artists. During the Reformation the church was spared, because the city fathers sided with the reigning king Philip II of Spain, rather than William the Silent, representing the Orange rebels. Later, after the Orangists conquered the northern half of Holland, Gouda reverted to Orange in 1572. It was only during this period that the church was in danger, and three weeks later an angry mob stormed the church and plundered the contents, but left the windows intact. The church was closed, but many wealthy regents of the city attempted to have it reopened. In 1573 the Gouda council prohibited the practice of Roman Catholic religion and in the summer it was opened for the Protestant Dutch Reformed faith, which it still has today. The windows from before 1573, the Catholic windows, show scenes from the Bible and the Apocrypha, a collection of Jewish literature included in the Catholic Bible. Among other stories, these windows portray the stories of the Queen of Sheba visiting Solomon, Judith and Holofernes, the punishment of Heliodorus, the birth of John the Baptist, and the birth and baptism of Jesus. There are two windows in the choir depicting Jesus on the Mount. Dirk and Wouter Crabeth designed most of these windows. Many of the early windows were paid for by powerful Catholic individuals or groups. Among them were Philip II of Spain and the Canon Priests of Oude Munster. The later, Protestant windows mostly show scenes from contemporary battles and metaphorical scenes relating to the political situation of the time. While there are still some religious and biblical scenes among these windows, only one specifically portrays Jesus, whereas the pre-Calvinist windows have seven scenes containing the Son of God. The Protestant windows depict the siege of Leiden, the siege of Samaria, and two coats of arms from the Rhineland. These windows were donated by city councils and Protestant statesmen, such as William the Silent and the city of Amsterdam. In 1954 the Van der Vorm chapel was added to house the 7 regulierenglazen from the Monastery of the Clerks Regular (Regulierenklooster) in Gouda. In earlier days this Monastery, in which Erasmus lived from 1486-1491, was located in the land van Stein (in the neighborhood of Gouda). Relocation to Gouda, in 1551, was necessary for safety reasons. The 7 panes were in that period (1556-1559) designed and placed in the monastery chapel. When the monastery was demolished in 1580 the panes were moved to the Sint Janskerk. They were initially placed in positions 20 and 21. After restoration they were moved to the newly-built Van der Vorm chapel.

In 1939 the stained glass was removed in anticipation of war with Germany. Later during the war, in 1944, when 51,000 men were called for service from Schiedam and Rotterdam, about 2800 were marched to Gouda, where they spent the night in this church on November 10.

The church tower contains an historic carillon, currently played by Boudewijn Zwart and formerly played by Maria Blom from 1943-1985. The carillon was originally installed in 1676, with 37 bells cast by Hemony, of which 16 have survived. In 1966, the Royal Eijsbouts Bell Foundry enlarged the carillon with 33 bells, bringing the total to 50 bells. The carillon also includes a bell cast by Hendrick Wegewaert in 1605.

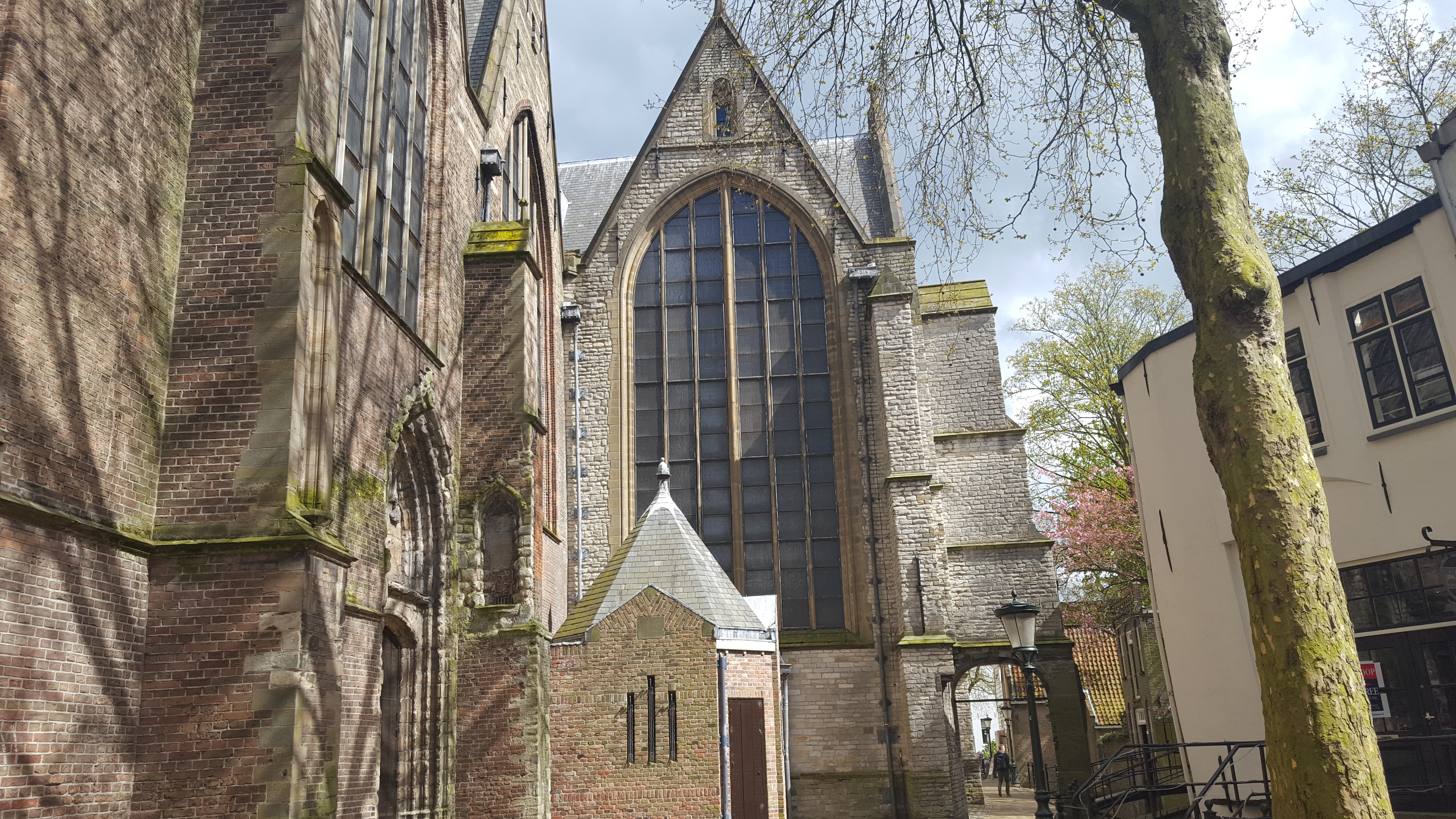
Side view of the Sint-Janskerk in Gouda

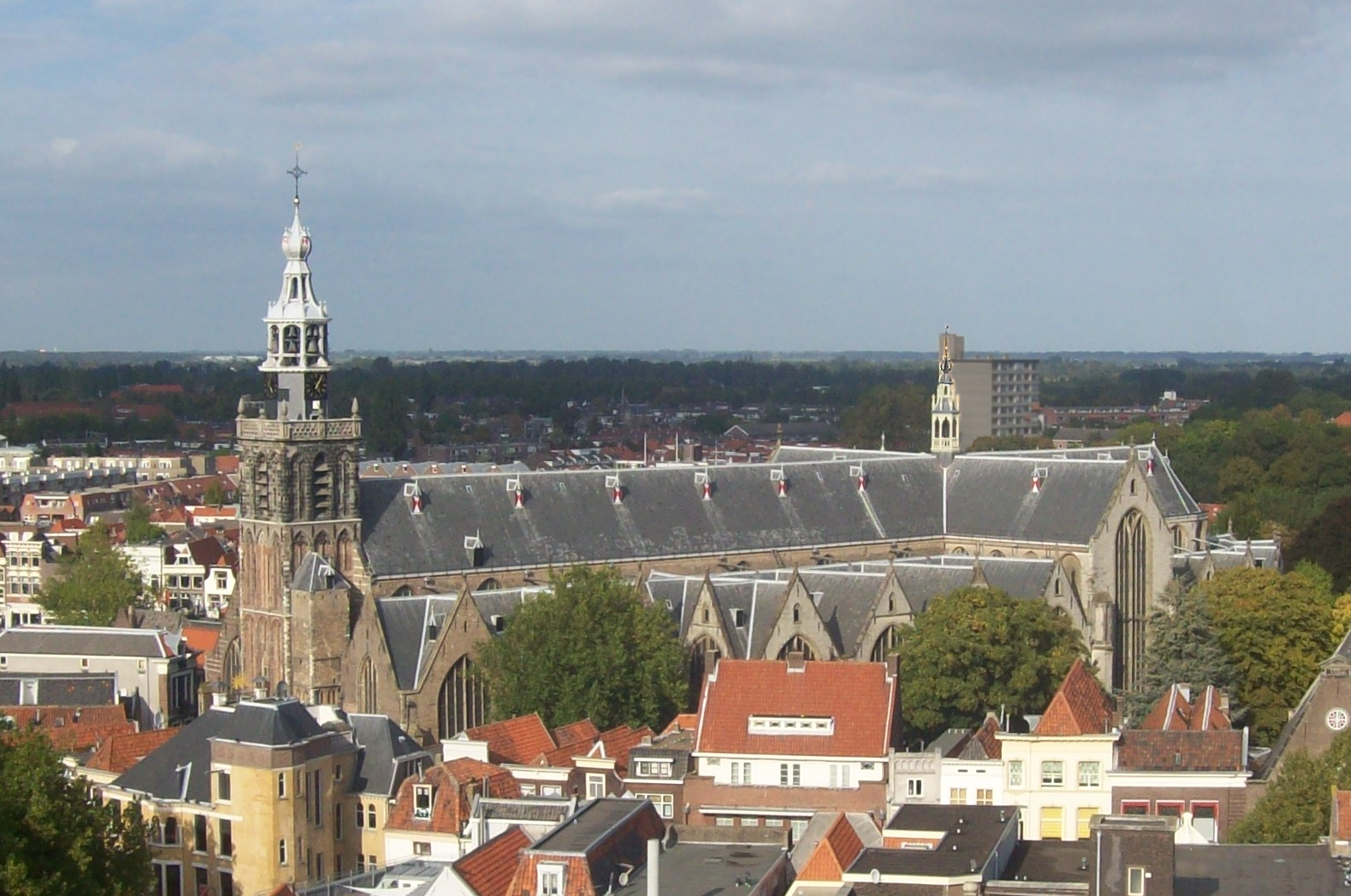
The longest church in the Netherlands.

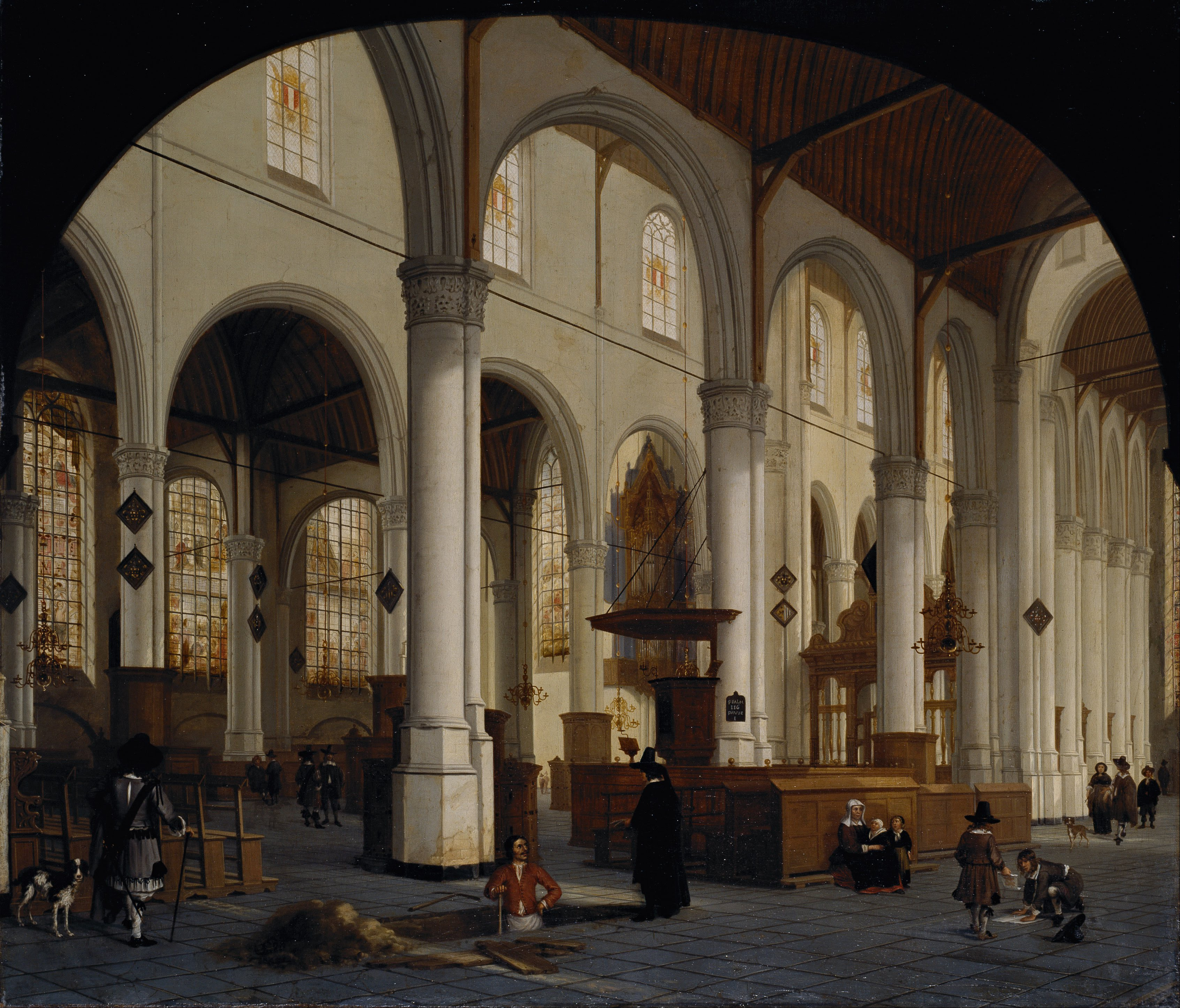
Interior by Hendrik van Vliet in 1662.

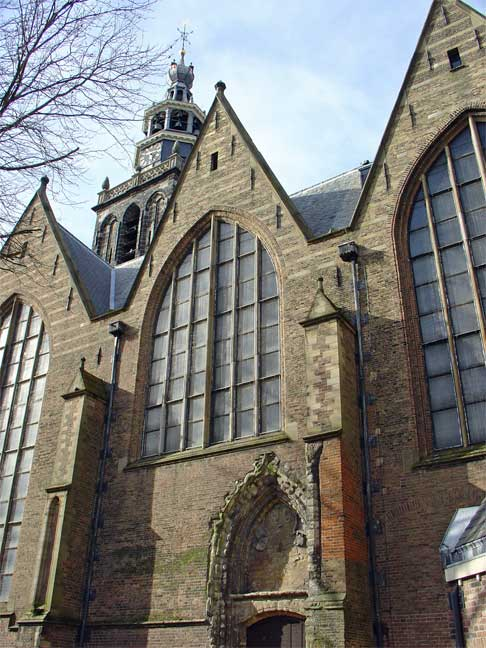
Sint Janskerk

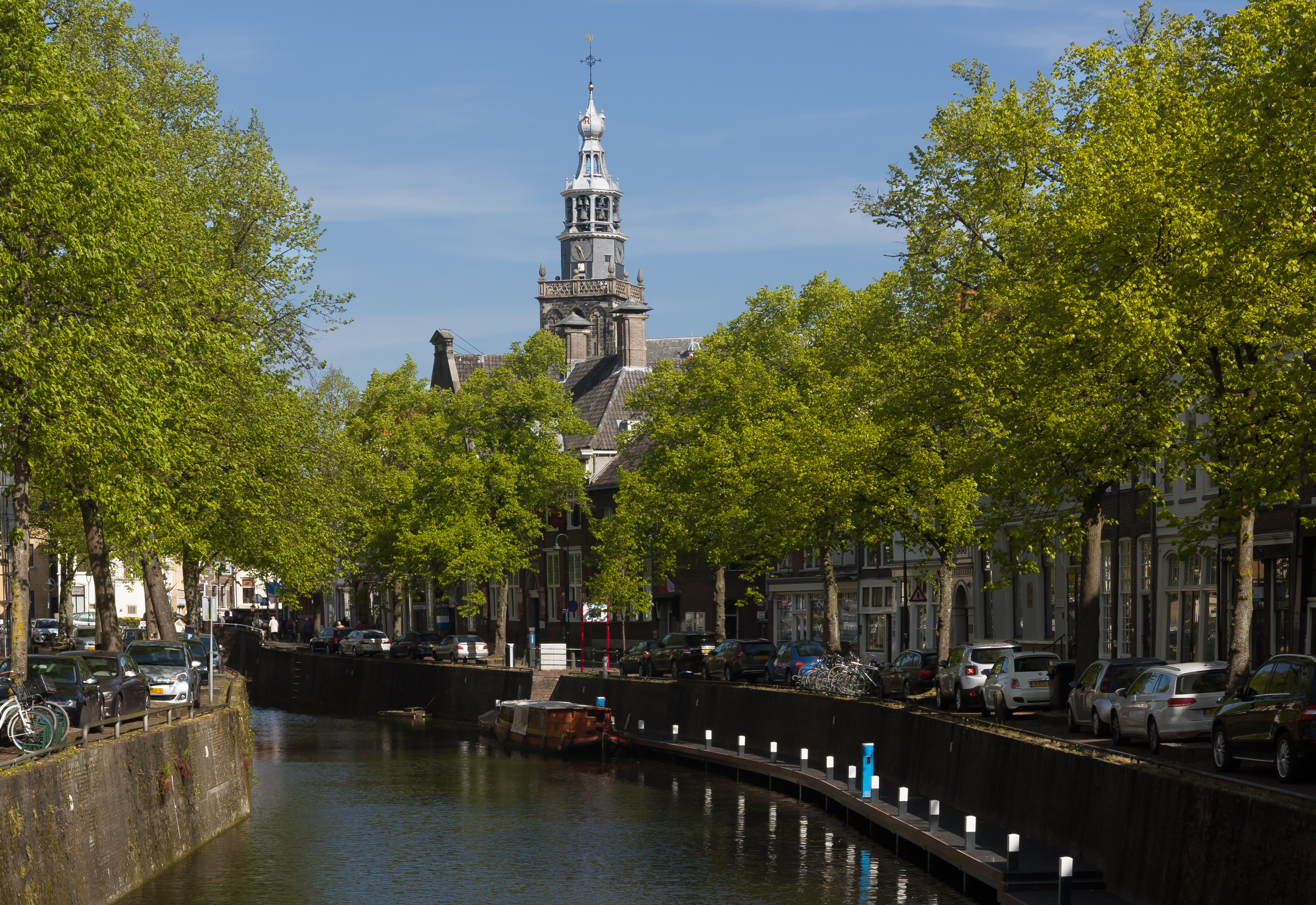
Churchtower (Grote or Sint Janskerk)

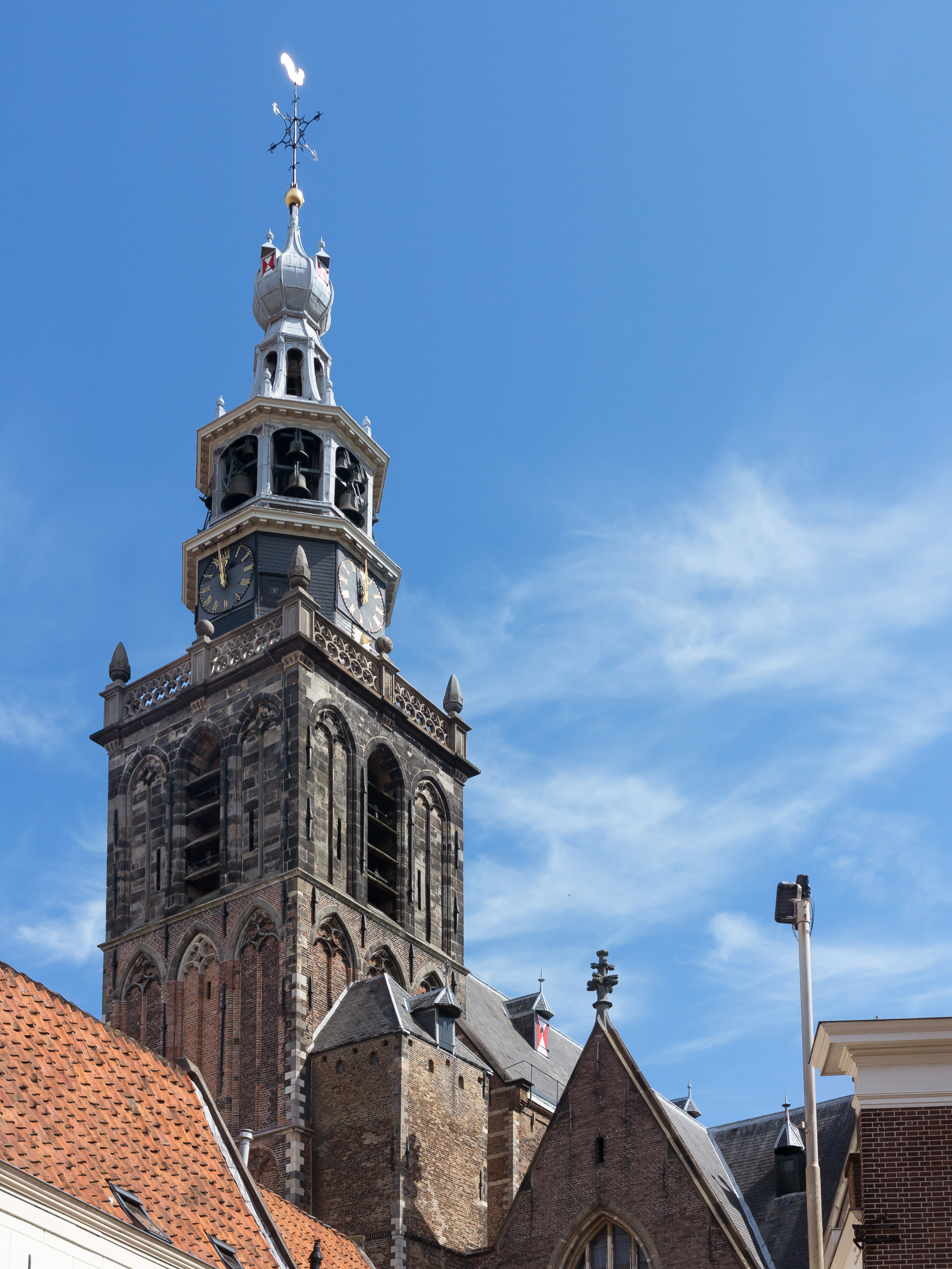
Churchtower (Grote or Sint Janskerk)

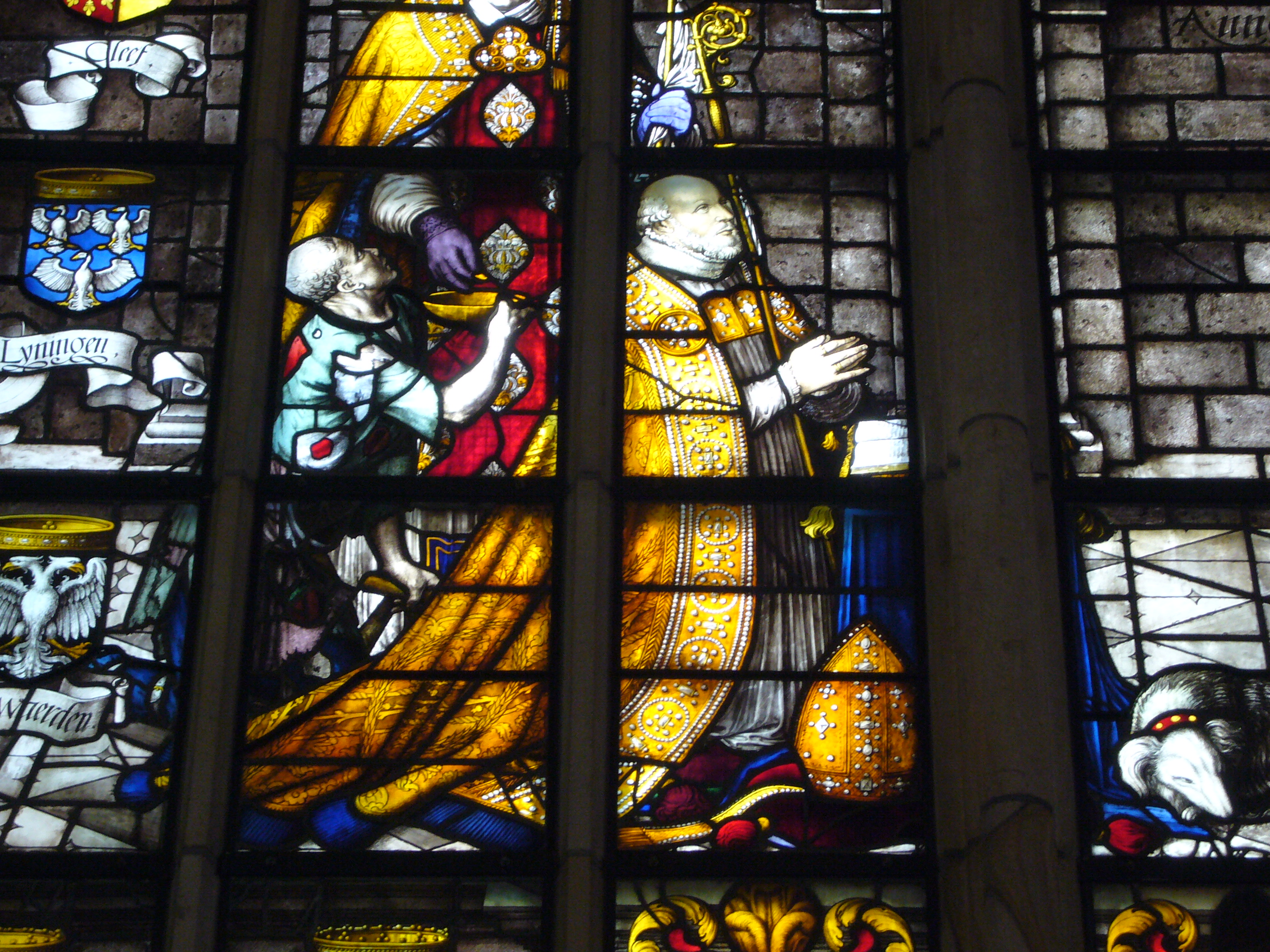
George van Egmond, the first glass donor.

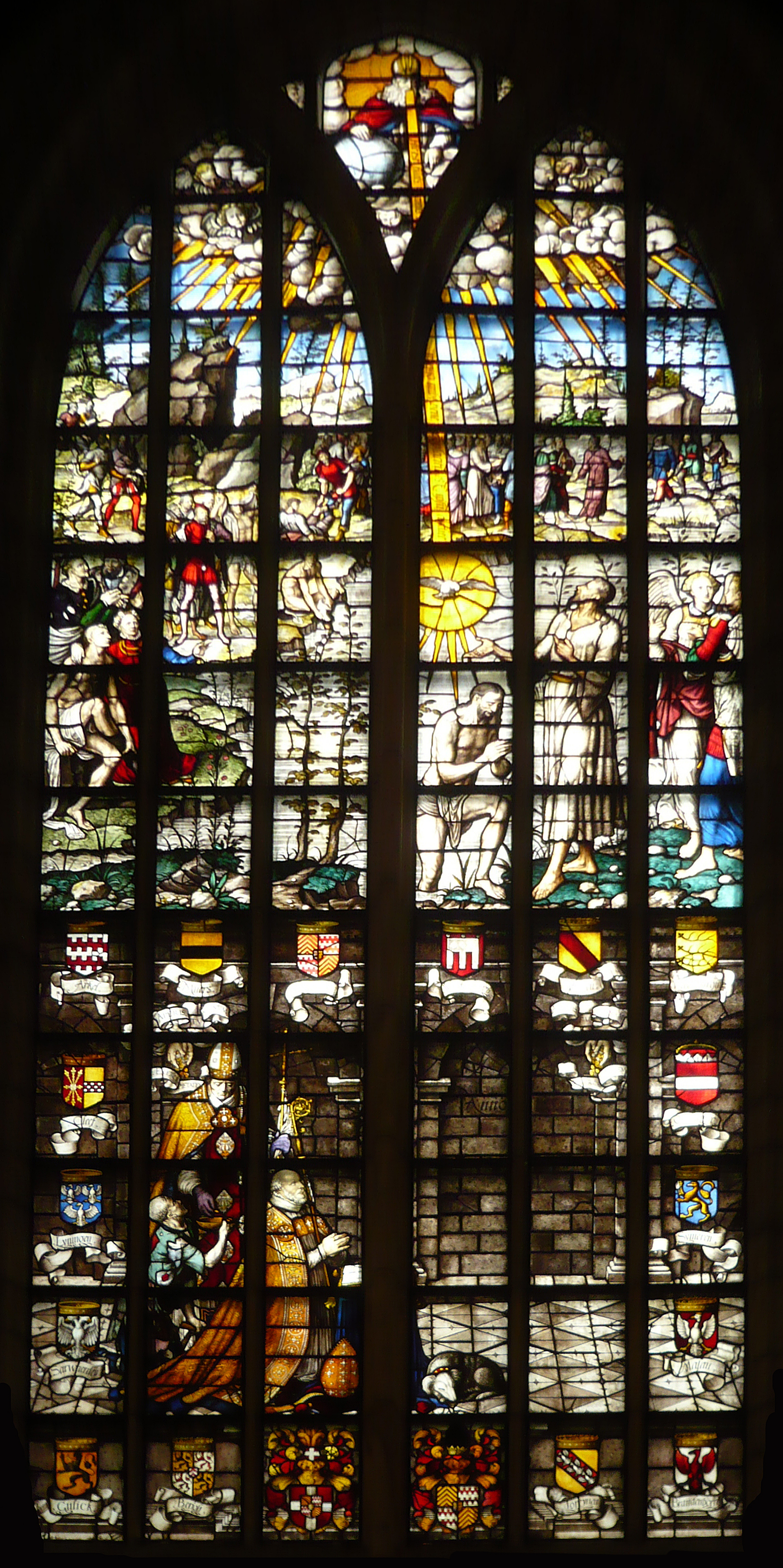
The Baptism of Jesus

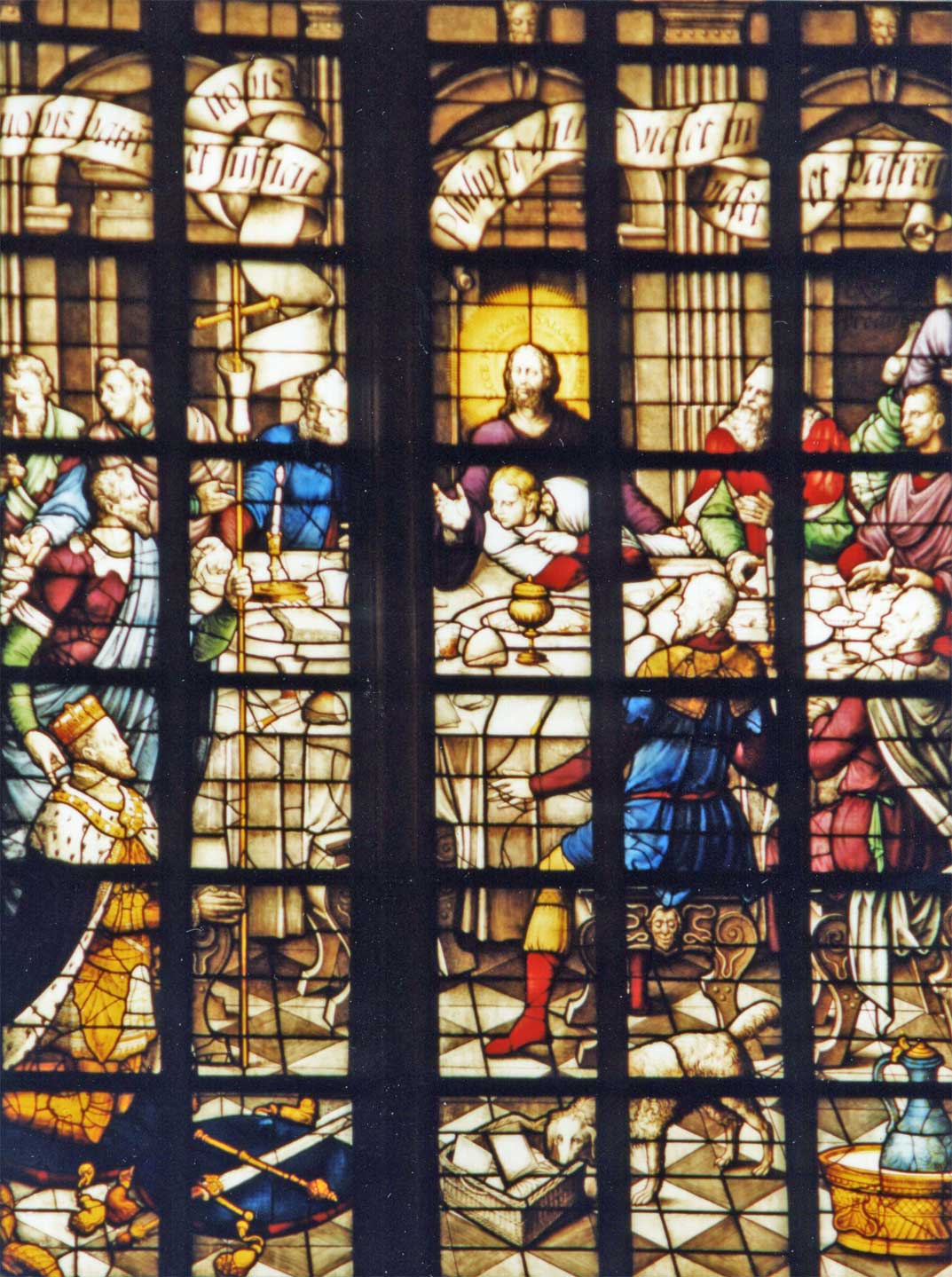
The last supper.

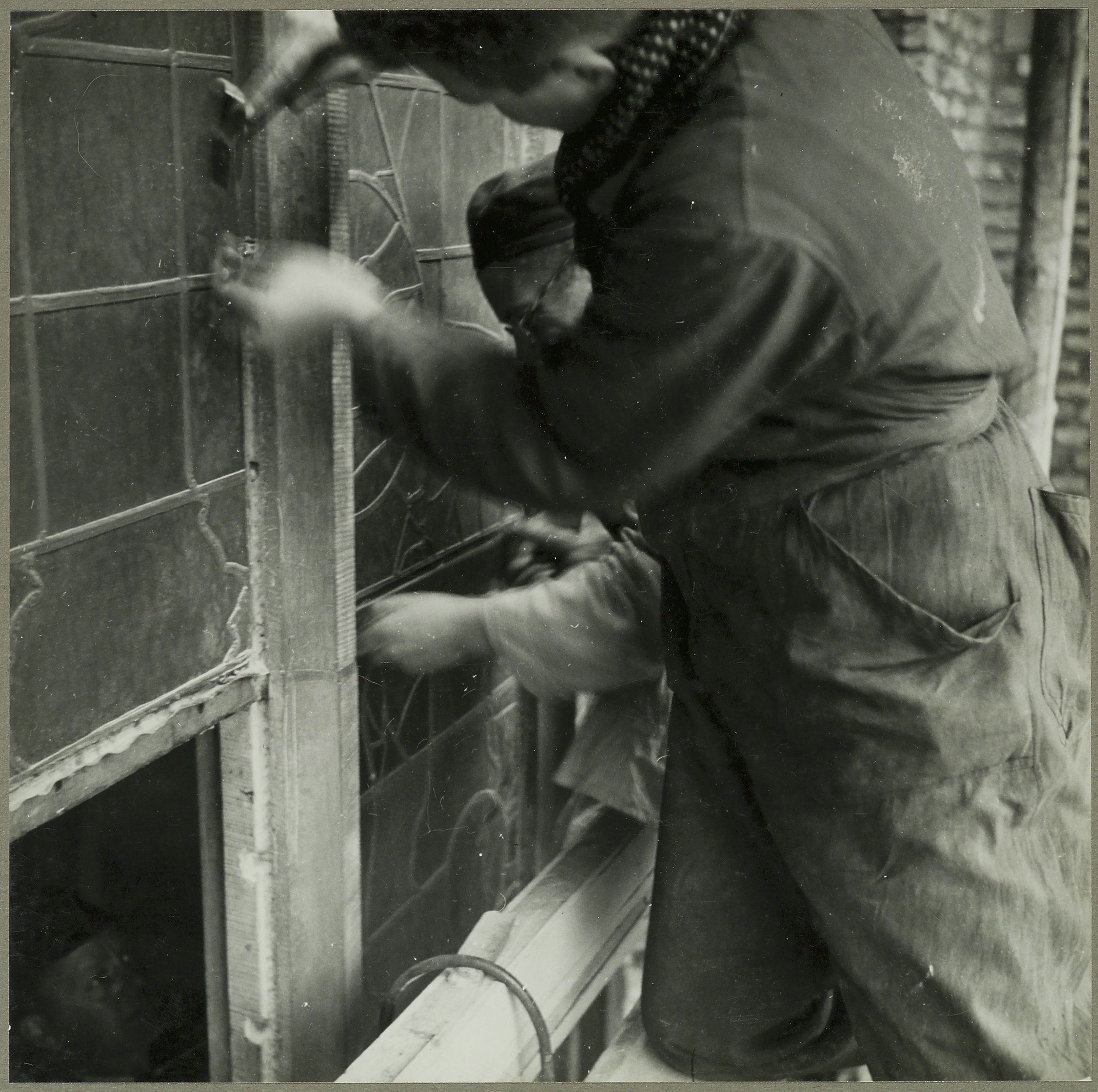
Workers reinforcing the stained glass windows during World War II

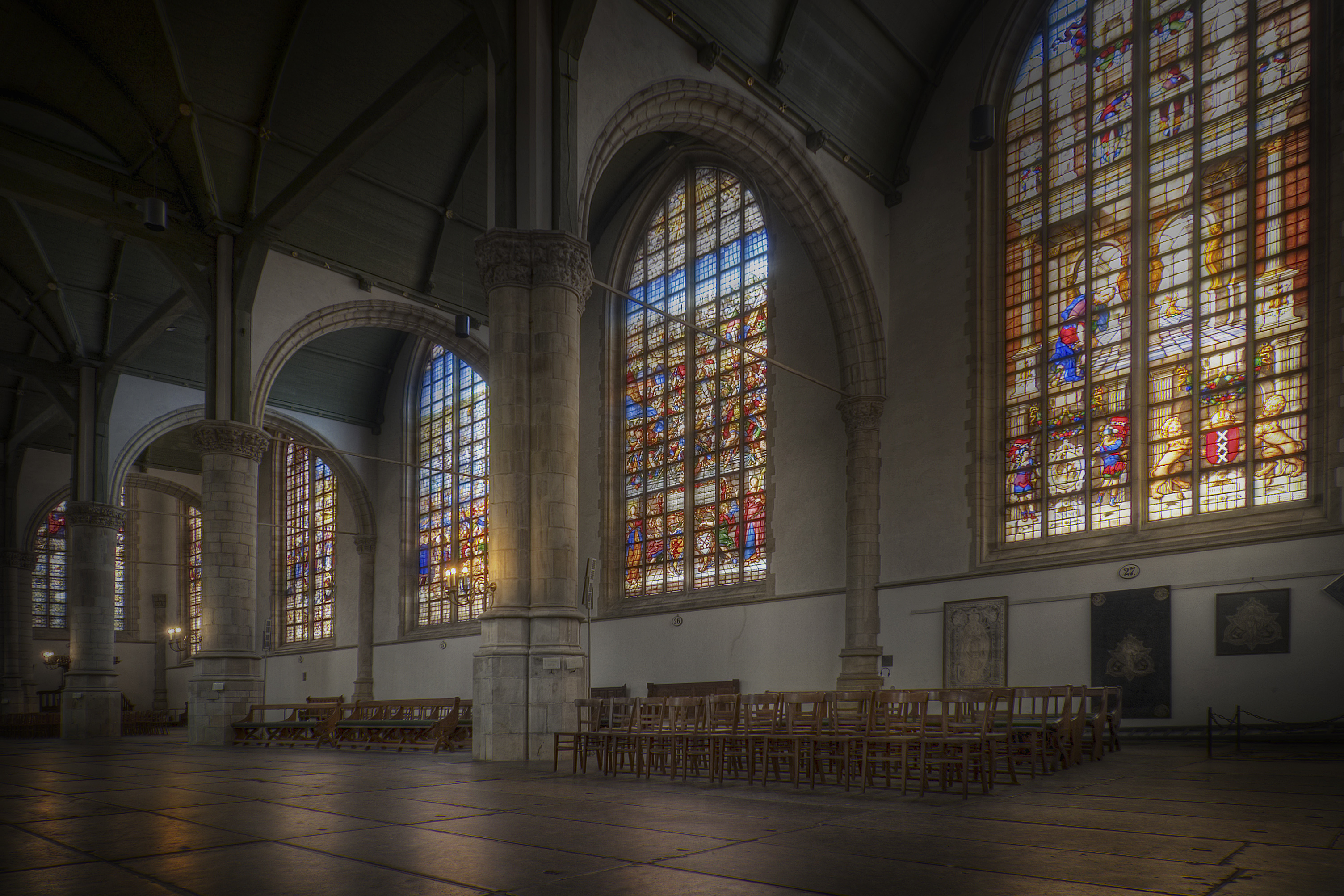
Overview: Stained glass windows

== See also ==
- List of stained glass windows in the Janskerk, Gouda
